= List of people hanged, drawn and quartered =

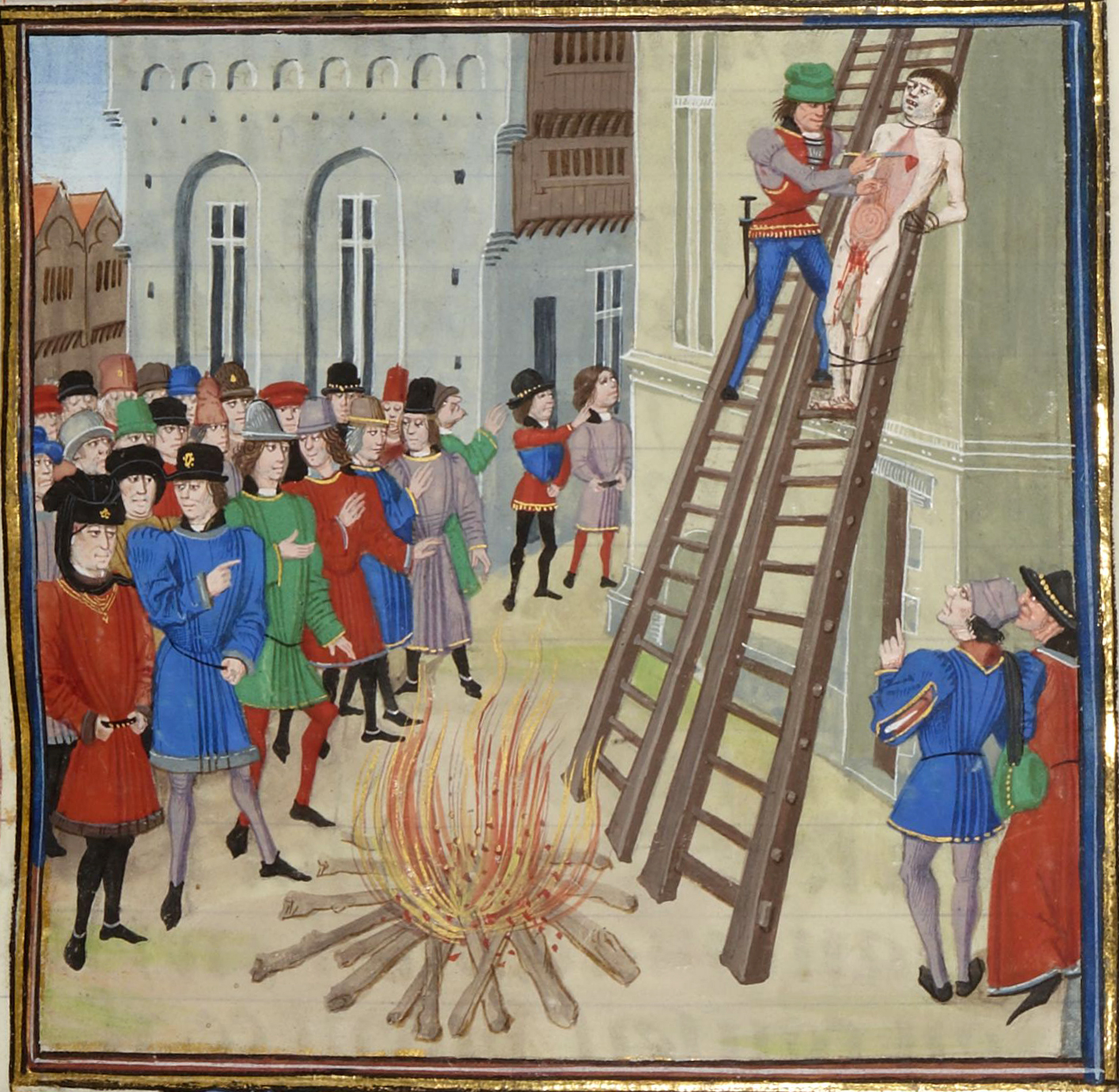
The execution of Hugh Despenser the Younger, as pictured in the Froissart of Louis of Gruuthuse

To be hanged, drawn and quartered was a penalty in England, Wales, Ireland and the United Kingdom for several crimes, but mainly for high treason. This method was abolished in 1870.

| Date executed | Name | Notes |
|---|---|---|
| 3 October 1283 | Dafydd ap Gruffydd | The last independent ruler of Wales, and the first prominent person to be executed in this manner |
| 23 August 1305 | William Wallace | Treason in the Wars of Scottish Independence |
| 1318 | Gilbert Middleton | Rebellion and treason |
| 3 March 1323 | Andrew Harclay, 1st Earl of Carlisle | Treason in the Wars of Scottish Independence |
| 24 November 1326 | Hugh Despenser the Younger | For sodomy; contemporary accounts differ on whether he died from the full sentence of being hanged, drawn, and quartered |
| 4 July 1381 | Thomas Baker (Peasants' Revolt leader) | Aftermath of the 1381 Peasants' Revolt |
| 15 July 1381 | John Ball | Aftermath of the 1381 Peasants' Revolt |
| 1381–1382 | John Buk | Aftermath of the 1381 Peasants' Revolt |
| 1381–1382 | Richard de Leycester | Aftermath of the 1381 Peasants' Revolt |
| 6 May 1382 | John Wrawe | Aftermath of the 1381 Peasants' Revolt |
| 1388 | Thomas Usk | Accused of misleading King Richard II |
| 1400 | Thomas Blount | Executed for plotting the overthrow of Henry IV of England in the Epiphany Rising |
| 1401 | Llywelyn ap Gruffydd Fychan | Allowed Owain Glyndŵr to escape capture, and therefore disemboweled and dismembered |
| 1404 | John Cerle | Killed the Duke of Gloucester and therefore Johannes Cerle was hanged, drawn, and quartered |
| 1459 | William Overy | Squire to James, Earl of Ormond and Wiltshire, leader of the Irish Lancastrians; Overy attempted to arrest Richard, Duke of York as a traitor to the (Lancastrian) King Henry VI but was arrested himself, tried before the Duke and hanged, drawn and quartered for treason, as the Duke of York was at the time calling himself Lord Lieutenant of Ireland, and so an attack on his person was judged to be treason. |
| 1539 | Richard Whiting (abbot) | The last Abbot of Glastonbury executed on Glastonbury Tor for treason, alongside two of his monks, John Thorne and Roger James who suffered the same fate. |
| 1541 | Francis Dereham | Executed for "Succeeding the King in the Queen's affections" |
| 1550 | Humphrey Arundell | Executed for leading the Prayer Book Rebellion |
| 1554 | Thomas Wyatt the younger | Sentenced to be hanged, drawn and quartered for Wyatt's rebellion, but the sentence was commuted to beheading |
| May 1554 | William Thomas (scholar) | Accused of planning to murder Mary I of England |
| 1577 | Cuthbert Mayne | Two of the Forty Martyrs of England and Wales executed under anti-Catholic laws |
| 1581 | Edmund Campion | Two of the Forty Martyrs of England and Wales executed under anti-Catholic laws |
| 5 July 1581 | Matthew Lambert | Miller, known as one of the Wexford Martyrs. Hanged, drawn and quartered in Wexford, Ireland as punishment for aiding the escape of James Eustace, 3rd Viscount Baltinglass and several Catholic priests from Ireland, and for refusing to take the Oath of Supremacy. |
| 1 December 1581 | Alexander Briant | Catholic priest, one of the Forty Martyrs of England and Wales |
| 20 September 1586 | Anthony Babington | Executed for involvement in the Babington plot |
| 20 September 1586 | John Ballard (Jesuit) | Executed for involvement in the Babington plot |
| 20 September 1586 | Chidiock Tichborne | Executed for involvement in the Babington plot |
| 20 September 1586 | Henry Donn | Executed for involvement in the Babington plot |
| 20 September 1586 | Robert Barnewell | Executed for involvement in the Babington plot |
| 20 September 1586 | John Savage | Executed for involvement in the Babington plot |
| 1586 | Edward Havington | Executed for involvement in the Babington plot, part of the second group which was required by Elizabeth I to hang until "quite dead" before disemboweling and quartering after public outcry at the horror of the drawing and quartering of 20 September 1586 |
| 1586 | Charles Tilney | Executed for involvement in the Babington plot, hung until "quite dead" before disemboweling and quartering |
| 1586 | Edward Jones | Executed for involvement in the Babington plot, hung until "quite dead" before disemboweling and quartering |
| 1586 | John Charnock | Executed for involvement in the Babington plot, hung until "quite dead" before disemboweling and quartering |
| 1586 | John Travers | Executed for involvement in the Babington plot, hung until "quite dead" before disemboweling and quartering |
| 1586 | Jerome Bellamy | Executed for involvement in the Babington plot, hung until "quite dead" before disemboweling and quartering |
| 1586 | Robert Gage | Executed for involvement in the Babington plot, hung until "quite dead" before disemboweling and quartering |
| 3 November 1591 | Brian na Múrtha Ó Ruairc | Executed for rebellion against the crown, hung, drawn, and quartered |
| 24 July 1594 | John Boste | Catholic priest, one of the Forty Martyrs of England and Wales |
| 1595 | Roderigo Lopes | English doctor executed for allegedly poisoning Elizabeth I. Later believed to be innocent. |
| 7 June 1603 | Valentine Thomas | For plotting against Elizabeth I. |
| 30 January 1606 | Everard Digby | For involvement in Gunpowder Plot |
| 30 January 1606 | Robert Wintour | For involvement in Gunpowder Plot |
| 30 January 1606 | John Grant | For involvement in Gunpowder Plot |
| 30 January 1606 | Thomas Bates | For involvement in Gunpowder Plot |
| 30 January 1606 | Thomas Wintour | For involvement in Gunpowder Plot |
| 30 January 1606 | Ambrose Rookwood | For involvement in Gunpowder Plot |
| 30 January 1606 | Robert Keyes | For involvement in Gunpowder Plot |
| 30 January 1606 | Guy Fawkes | For involvement in Gunpowder Plot, but he managed to cheat the executioner by jumping from the scaffold while his head was in the noose, breaking his neck. His lifeless body was nevertheless drawn and quartered, and his body parts distributed to "the four corners of the kingdom". |
| 28 August 1628 | Edmund Arrowsmith | Catholic priest, one of the Forty Martyrs of England and Wales |
| 10 September 1641 | Ambrose Barlow | Catholic priest, one of the Forty Martyrs of England and Wales |
| 30 May 1643 | George Bouchier | For his activities in the English Civil War |
| 30 May 1643 | Robert Yeamans | For his activities in the English Civil War |
| 30 May 1643 | Philip Powell | For being a priest |
| 1653 | Felim O'Neill of Kinard | Executed for his part in the Irish Rebellion of 1641 |
| 28 June 1654 | John Southworth | Cromwell ordered that surgeons sew the corpse back together so that it could be sent to Douai College for burial |
| 7 July 1658 | Edward Ashton (colonel) | For the plot against the Lord Protector set on foot by agents of Charles II in 1658, and for complicity in which Sir Henry Slingsby and John Hewet were executed |
| 13 October 1660 | Col. Thomas Harrison | For regicide of Charles I |
| 19 October 1660 | Daniel Axtell | For regicide of Charles I |
| 1663 | Thomas Oates | Executed for participating in the Farnley Wood Plot |
| 1663 | Samuel Ellis | Executed for participating in the Farnley Wood Plot |
| 1663 | John Nettleton, sr. | Executed for participating in the Farnley Wood Plot |
| 1663 | John Nettleton, jr. | Executed for participating in the Farnley Wood Plot |
| 1663 | Robert Scott | Executed for participating in the Farnley Wood Plot |
| 1663 | William Tolson | Executed for participating in the Farnley Wood Plot |
| 1663 | John Forster | Executed for participating in the Farnley Wood Plot |
| 1663 | Robert Olroyd | Executed for participating in the Farnley Wood Plot |
| 1663 | John Asquith | Executed for participating in the Farnley Wood Plot |
| 1663 | Peregrine Corney | Executed for participating in the Farnley Wood Plot |
| 1663 | John Snowden | Executed for participating in the Farnley Wood Plot |
| 1663 | John Smith | Executed for participating in the Farnley Wood Plot |
| 1663 | William Ash | Executed for participating in the Farnley Wood Plot |
| 1663 | John Errington | Executed for participating in the Farnley Wood Plot |
| 1663 | Robert Atkins | Executed for participating in the Farnley Wood Plot |
| 1663 | William Colton | Executed for participating in the Farnley Wood Plot |
| 1663 | George Denham | Executed for participating in the Farnley Wood Plot |
| 1663 | Henry Watson | Executed for participating in the Farnley Wood Plot |
| 1663 | Richard Wilson | Executed for participating in the Farnley Wood Plot |
| 1663 | Ralph Rymer | Executed for participating in the Farnley Wood Plot |
| 1663 | Charles Carre | Executed for participating in the Farnley Wood Plot |
| 18 January 1676 | Joshua Tefft | Unlawfully fighting with Indians |
| 1678 | William Staley | First victim of the Popish Plot |
| 1 July 1681 | Oliver Plunkett | Last victim of the Popish Plot |
| 1685 | over 200 | Charged with treason following the Monmouth Rebellion, their remains were parboiled, tarred, and displayed on poles, trees and lampposts; only when James II conducted a progress through the area were they removed and buried |
| 1766 | Nicholas Sheehy | An Irish Catholic Priest who was hanged, drawn and quartered for supposedly aiding the murder of John Bridges (though there are claims that Bridges survived) |
| 16 February 1788 | Robert Keon | Hanged, drawn, and quartered for murder in a private quarrel John and Henry Sheares, Irish patriots, were hanged on 14 July 1798, outside of Newgate Prison |
| 20 September 1803 | Robert Emmet | Hanged and then beheaded once dead for high treason in the Irish Rebellion of 1803. He was also the most recent person to be executed in this way |

== See also ==
- Leisler's Rebellion#Execution, in New York City, 1691.

== Sources ==
- Allen, Kenneth (1973), The Story of Gunpowder, Wayland, ISBN 978-0-85340-188-9
- Feilden, Henry St. Clair (2009) [1910], A Short Constitutional History of England, Read Books, ISBN 978-1-4446-9107-8
- Fraser, Antonia (2005) [1996], The Gunpowder Plot, London: Phoenix, ISBN 0-7538-1401-3
- Haynes, Alan (2005) [1994], The Gunpowder Plot: Faith in Rebellion, Sparkford, England: Hayes and Sutton, ISBN 0-7509-4215-0
- Holinshed, Raphael (1808), Chronicles of England, Scotland and Ireland, vol. 4, London: Johnson
- Jesse, John Heneage (1847), Literary and historical memorials of London, vol. 2, Bentley
- Northcote Parkinson, C. (1976), Gunpowder Treason and Plot, Weidenfeld and Nicolson, ISBN 0-297-77224-4
- Oman, Charles (1906), The Great Revolt of 1381, Oxford: Clarendon Press
- Thompson, Irene (2008), The A to Z of Punishment and Torture: From Amputations to Zero Tolerance, Book Guild Publishing, ISBN 978-1-84624-203-8
- Wormald, Patrick (2001) [1999], The Making of English Law: King Alfred to the Twelfth Century, Legislation and Its Limits, Oxford: Wiley-Blackwell, ISBN 0-631-22740-7
- Zook, Melinda S. (1999), Radical whigs and conspiratorial politics in late Stuart England, Penn State Press, ISBN 0-271-01856-9
