= John Savage (died 1586) =

English Catholic and conspirator

John Savage (died 20 September 1586) was an English Catholic, who was one of the conspirators executed for his involvement in the Babington Plot, a plot in 1586 to assassinate Queen Elizabeth, a Protestant, and put Mary, Queen of Scots, a Catholic, on the English throne. A former soldier, Savage was to have been the man who would personally assassinate Elizabeth.

== Background and involvement in the Babington plot ==
Savage was likely a member of the Derbyshire branch of the Savage family, a wealthy Catholic family. An ardent Roman Catholic, he joined the army of Alexander Farnese, governor of the Spanish Netherlands and captain-general of the Army of Flanders (later Duke of Parma) and saw active service in the Low Countries. On his return to England he passed through Rheims and encountered Dr. William Gifford, a fellow Catholic who persuaded him that the assassination of Queen Elizabeth was the only solution to the injustices faced by the Catholics of England. Savage arrived in London in early 1586 and met John Ballard in the city in March of that year and volunteered to join the conspiracy that Ballard and Anthony Babington had begun to formulate which aimed to carry out the murder of Queen Elizabeth, the release of Mary, Queen of Scots from prison and then to put Mary on the throne with foreign support. His service was 'eagerly accepted' by Babington. Savage was the only member of Babington's plot who was not previously attached to the royal court, however the Savage family of Derbyshire were seemingy distantly connected with Babington's family, who were also from Derbyshire. In 1489 John Babington and Ralph Savage were jointly granted a license to found a chantry at North Wynfield, Derbyshire.

At a meeting of the conspirators at St Giles in the Fields in April, Savage was one of the six who were nominated to carry out assassination of the queen. The conspiracy had been infiltrated from almost the beginning and some of the group were acting as double agents for Elizabeth's spy master Sir Francis Walsingham, most notably Gilbert Gifford, cousin of Dr William Gifford, who had initially communicated with Savage. This infiltration led to the conspiracy becoming compromised and arrests being carried out. Following the arrest of Ballard, Babington went to Savage to inform of this news. Savage told Babington that he would go and immediately carry out the assassination of Queen Elizabeth. Babington agreed with this proposal and provided Savage with money to help carry out the task.

== Arrest and execution ==
Savage was arrested in London along with two other members of the conspiracy, Chidiock Tichbourne and Thomas Tilney, before the assassination could be accomplished. Savage freely confessed to having been a part of the conspiracy, and plead guilty at his trial. His confession was made without threat of torture and was read by the clerk of the crown. As with the other members of the conspiracy, Savage was sentenced to death and he was amongst the first group of conspirators to be executed. The sentence was carried out on 20 September, in an open space in the parish of St Giles in the Fields (where he had been nominated to carry out the assassination of Elizabeth). Just as Babington had, Savage made a speech from the scaffold where he proclaimed that he had been taught as a Catholic in England to regard the murder of the Protestant queen as a 'lawful and meritorious act'. His execution was not a straightforward or pleasant one; during his hanging the rope broke before he was dead and he fell from the gallows. The rest of his sentence, which entailed hanging, drawing and quartering, was performed upon him while he was still alive. Following the failure of the conspiracy and the executions of its members, Mary, Queen of Scots, was executed by beheading for her knowledge and support of the treasonous plot.

== Bibliography ==
- Armstrong, George Francis (1888). The ancient and noble family of the Savages of the Ards. London.
- Fraser, Antonia (1985). Mary Queen of Scots. London. ISBN 041357380X.
- Lee, Sidney (1897). Dictionary of National Biography. London. ISBN 1844151662.
- Tutino, Stefania (2007). Law and Conscience: Catholicism in Early Modern England, 1570–1625. Abingdon-on-Thames. ISBN 9780754657712.
