= Elizabeth R =

TV miniseries

- Glenda Jackson as Elizabeth I
- Genre: Drama
- Starring: Glenda Jackson; Ronald Hines; Stephen Murray; Robert Hardy
- Country of origin: United Kingdom
- Original language: English
- No. of series: 1
- No. of episodes: 6

Production
- Running time: 6 × 85 minutes

Original release
- Network: BBC2
- Release: 17 February – 24 March 1971

Related
- The Six Wives of Henry VIII

Elizabeth R is a BBC television drama serial of six 85-minute plays starring Glenda Jackson as Queen Elizabeth I of England. It was first broadcast on BBC2 from February to March 1971, through the ABC in Australia and broadcast in the United States on PBS's Masterpiece Theatre. The series has been repeated several times, most recently from 15 March 2023, by BBC Four.

== Production ==
Elizabeth R was filmed at a variety of locations including Penshurst Place, which doubled as the queen's castle grounds and Chiddingstone in Kent, though all the interiors were recorded at the BBC Television Centre.

The first episode was broadcast on 17 February 1971, beginning on screen with the year 1549 as the setting, with Princess Elizabeth's difficult ascent to the throne of England nine years later. The final episode was shown on 24 March 1971, the 368th anniversary of the Queen's death on March 24, 1603. It was repeated almost immediately in response to audience demand.

The series followed the successful Six Wives of Henry VIII (1970), with several performers reprising their roles in Elizabeth R (all in the first episode) from the earlier series, notably John Ronane as Thomas Seymour, 1st Baron Seymour of Sudeley, Bernard Hepton as Cranmer, Basil Dignam as Bishop Gardiner and Rosalie Crutchley as Catherine Parr.

In February 1972 Elizabeth R first aired in the United States on Masterpiece Theatre, then hosted by Alistair Cooke on PBS. In the summer of 1972 it was rebroadcast with commercials on the New York City independent station WOR-TV Channel 9.

Glenda Jackson's performance in the title role won her two Emmy Awards—for Best Actress in a Drama Series and Best Actress in a Movie/TV Special (for the episode Shadow in the Sun). The series itself won the Emmy for the Best Dramatic Series in 1972 (the first British TV series ever to win the American TV award, before Upstairs, Downstairs carried the award two years later). At around the same time Jackson also played the part of Elizabeth in the film Mary, Queen of Scots (1971).

Costume designer Elizabeth Waller won an Emmy for her designs; she recreated many of the historical Elizabeth's actual gowns, adapting them from a number of the Queen's official portraits. They later went on display at Hampton Court Palace. Elizabeth R featured many well-known British actors, including Malcolm McFee, Michael Williams, Margaretta Scott, John Woodvine, James Laurenson, Angela Thorne, Brian Wilde, Robin Ellis, Robert Hardy and Peter Egan.

The series was parodied in Monty Python's Flying Circus in an absurdist sketch where a Japanese film director, disguised unconvincingly as Luchino Visconti, forces his cast to perform as Queen Elizabeth's court while sitting on motor-scooters and speaking Engrish. Therefore the title was changed to Erizabeth L. Elizabeth R was first released for DVD Region 1 during 2001 by BBC Warner and then rereleased by BBC Worldwide in 2011. In DVD Region 2 it was issued by 2 Entertain in 2006.

== Cast ==
Note: This list is incomplete.

- Glenda Jackson as Elizabeth I
- Robert Hardy as Robert Dudley, 1st Earl of Leicester
- Ronald Hines as Sir William Cecil, Lord Burghley
- Stephen Murray as Sir Francis Walsingham
- John Shrapnel as Thomas Radclyffe, 3rd Earl of Sussex
- Bernard Horsfall as Sir Christopher Hatton
- Robin Ellis as Robert Devereux, Earl of Essex
- Jason Kemp as Edward VI (previously credited) as Anthony Kemp
- Daphne Slater as Mary I of England
- Vivian Pickles as Mary, Queen of Scots
- Hamilton Dyce as Amyas Paulet
- Rachel Kempson as Kat Ashley
- Peter Jeffrey as Philip II of Spain
- Margaretta Scott as Catherine de' Medici
- Michael Williams as Francis, Duke of Anjou (and Alençon)
- James Laurenson as Jean de Simier
- Jill Balcon as Lady Cobham, Lady-in-Waiting
- David Collings as Anthony Babington
- Bernard Holley as Gilbert Gifford
- David Nettheim as Thomas Phelippes
- John Graham as William Davison
- John Woodvine as Sir Francis Drake
- Peter Howell as Charles Howard, 1st Earl of Nottingham
- John Nettleton as Sir Francis Bacon
- Angela Thorne as Lettice Knollys
- Hugh Dickson as Robert Cecil, 1st Earl of Salisbury
- Nicholas Selby as Sir Walter Raleigh
- Clifford Rose as Thomas Egerton, 1st Viscount Brackley
- John Ronane as Thomas Seymour, 1st Baron Seymour of Sudeley
- Bernard Hepton as Archbishop Cranmer
- Basil Dignam as Bishop Gardiner
- John Ruddock as Archbishop Whitgift
- Rosalie Crutchley as Catherine Parr
- Brian Wilde as Richard Topcliffe
- David Garfield as John Ballard
- Peter Egan as Henry Wriothesley, 3rd Earl of Southampton
- Hayden Jones as Charles Blount, 8th Baron Mountjoy
- Patrick O'Connell as Hugh O'Neill, Earl of Tyrone
- Sonia Fraser as Elizabeth Wriothesley, Countess of Southampton
- Shirley Dixon as Penelope Rich, Lady Rich
- Judith South as Frances Radclyffe, Countess of Sussex
- Raf De La Torre as John Dee
- Stanley Lebor as Sir Robert Tyrwhitt
- Nicolette Bernard as Lady Elizabeth Tyrwhitt
- Kevin Brennan as Bridges
- Julian Holloway as Antoine de Noailles
- Brendan Barry as Simon Renard
- Robert Garrett as Thomas Wyatt the Younger
- Alan Foss as Sir Henry Bedingfeld
- Philip Brack as John Dudley, 1st Duke of Northumberland
- Ian Barritt as Fowler
- Blake Butler as Thomas Parry
- Richard Parry as Guard
- Sarah Frampton as Lady Jane Grey
- Robert Barry as Lord Guildford Dudley
- Michael Culver as John Tregannon
- Esmond Knight as Bishop Álvaro de la Quadra

== Episodes ==
No.	Title	Original release date
1	"The Lion's Cub"	17 February 1971
The succession of the boy king Edward VI heralds dangerous times for the young Princess Elizabeth. Having narrowly avoided implication in Sir Thomas Seymour's attempted abduction of Edward, she becomes an unintentional figurehead for a Protestant rebellion led by Thomas Wyatt the Younger when her half-sister Queen Mary I, a devout Roman Catholic, succeeds to the throne.
2	"The Marriage Game"	24 February 1971
The new queen Elizabeth I is 25 years old—and unmarried. Her Council—particularly the man she trusts most, Sir William Cecil—urges her to marry quickly to ensure the succession. Only Lord Robert Dudley, at first her Master of the Horse, and eventually the Earl of Leicester, seems to interest the queen.
3	"Shadow in the Sun"	3 March 1971
Elizabeth meets her most eligible suitor yet: Francis, Duke of Alençon, the younger brother of the French king. A marriage will cement France's sought-for alliance with England. Despite the Puritans' rousing of opposition in the country (which her zealously anti-Catholic councillor Sir Francis Walsingham secretly approves of), Elizabeth seems taken with the witty and flower-tongued Francis. Her duties as queen clashing with her feelings as a woman, Elizabeth faces her toughest decision.
4	"Horrible Conspiracies"	10 March 1971
As long as the imprisoned Mary, Queen of Scots lives, she is the focus of plotters and revolutionaries. Despite a clampdown against conspiring Roman Catholics, Mary (Elizabeth's prisoner for nearly twenty years), inspires an attempt to overthrow Elizabeth. Elizabeth fears Mary's death will condemn her in the eyes of God.
5	"The Enterprise of England"	17 March 1971
The infirm King Philip II of Spain is eager to avenge the death of Mary, Queen of Scots. Philip orders an unprepared fleet, commanded by the inexperienced Duke of Medina Sidonia, to sail on England. Even as Elizabeth rebukes the hawks (privateers) in her council (both Walsingham and Sir Francis Drake), with her hopes of peace, the Spanish Armada appears on the horizons of England. Her fate and the future of the country now lie in the hands of Drake and the Navy.
6	"Sweet England's Pride"	24 March 1971
Robert Devereux, Earl of Essex is the people's champion. He and Charles Howard have been successful in capturing and sacking the Spanish seaport of Cádiz. Essex is given a great opportunity to rise in power by being made Lord Deputy of Ireland and quelling the uprising led by O'Neill, Earl of Tyrone, but he squanders his army, makes an inglorious truce with O'Neill, and returns to England without permission. After his unsuccessful uprising against the queen in London, he is executed. The old queen shines in her final address to Parliament, but dies soon afterwards. Her last action is a nod to Robert Cecil to his query about her successor being King James VI of Scotland.
