= Maliverey Catilyn =

16th-century English spy

Maliverey Catilyn (or Maliverny Caitlyn, Malevery Catlin, Malivery Kattelyne, or other variations) was an English spy in Elizabethan England.

== Early life ==
Little is known of Catilyn's family or early life, except that he had older brothers, which would normally have meant that he occupied a subordinate financial position. In around 1570, he joined the English army in the Netherlands under Colonel Thomas Morgan, but was forced to leave in 1585 or 1586 after a dispute with his superior.

== Government spy ==
After leaving the army, Catilyn travelled to Rouen, where he was still living in the spring of 1586, gathering information on English Catholics in exile for the benefit of the English government, particularly the spymaster and principal secretary Sir Francis Walsingham. By the end of June 1586, Catilyn was in Portsmouth, acting as a prison spy, and he also spent some time in the Marshalsea for the same purpose. At around the same time, he worked with other spies, such as Gilbert Gifford and Thomas Phelippes, to monitor the Babington Plot, an attempt to assassinate the queen. Catilyn served as an anti-Catholic spy partly out of conviction: he was inclined towards puritanism and once wrote to Walsingham complaining about the popularity of stage plays in London. There are numerous alternative spellings of Catilyn's unusual name, which was possibly a spy pseudonym.

== Booke of the Traytors ==
When the Babington conspiracy was quashed by the government, Catilyn wrote a narrative account of the subsequent treason trials, which is now held by the Derbyshire Record Office, entitled "Booke of the Traytors" (c. 1586).

== Death ==
Catilyn died sometime prior to 25 June 1589, and was survived by his wife, whose name is unknown.
