= Uxenden Hall =

Coordinates: 51.5710°N 0.3398°W

Uxenden Hall or Uxendon Hall was an English manor house near Harrow-on-the-Hill. In the sixteenth century it was inhabited by the Bellamy family.

== History ==
The hall's name was first recorded in 1257 as Woxindon, meaning "Wixan's Hill", and is thus related to Uxbridge. The Wixan were a 7th-century Saxon tribe from Lincolnshire who also began to settle in what became Middlesex.

The Bellamy family was known for its hospitality to fellow recusants and missionaries, and so the house was kept under surveillance.

In 1586, Jerome Bellamy sheltered the rebel Anthony Babington here, following the plot to assassinate Queen Elizabeth I. Babington was captured at Uxenden, and Jerome Bellamy was hung, drawn, and quartered at Tyburn on 21 September 1586.

In 1592, Jerome's older brother Richard was the owner of Uxenden. His daughter Anne was arrested, apparently for failure to attend church services, and confined to the Gatehouse Prison. At some point, she was interrogated and raped by Richard Topcliffe, the Queen's chief priest-hunter and torturer, and revealed the movements of Robert Southwell and the location of the Priest hole at Uxenden. Southwell was subsequently arrested at Uxenden.

The house remained in the Bellamy family until the early 17th century when it came into the possession of Richard Page of Wembley, one of the governors of Harrow School. The hall stood near where Preston Road tube station now stands, and is preserved in the street names "Uxendon Crescent" and "Uxendon Hill".
