= Throckmorton Plot =

1583 plot to overthrow Queen Elizabeth I of England

The 1583 Throckmorton Plot was one of a series of attempts by English Roman Catholics to depose Elizabeth I of England and replace her with Mary, Queen of Scots, then held under house arrest in England. The alleged objective was to facilitate an invasion of England, assassinate Elizabeth, and put Mary on the English throne.

The plot is named after a key conspirator in England, Francis Throckmorton, cousin of Bess Throckmorton, lady in waiting to Queen Elizabeth. Throckmorton was arrested in November 1583 and executed on 10 July 1584.

== Objectives ==
The plot aimed to free Mary, Queen of Scots, under house arrest in England since 1568, make her queen in place of Elizabeth, and legally restore Roman Catholicism. This would be achieved by a Spanish-backed invasion of England, led by the French Duke of Guise, supported by a simultaneous revolt of English Roman Catholics. It was suggested the invasion fleet would anchor at Piel Castle in Cumbria. Guise would then marry Mary and become king.

It was typical of the amateurish and overly optimistic approach of many such attempts. Throckmorton was placed under surveillance almost as soon as he returned to England, and subsequently arrested and executed. The plot was never put into action.

== Events ==
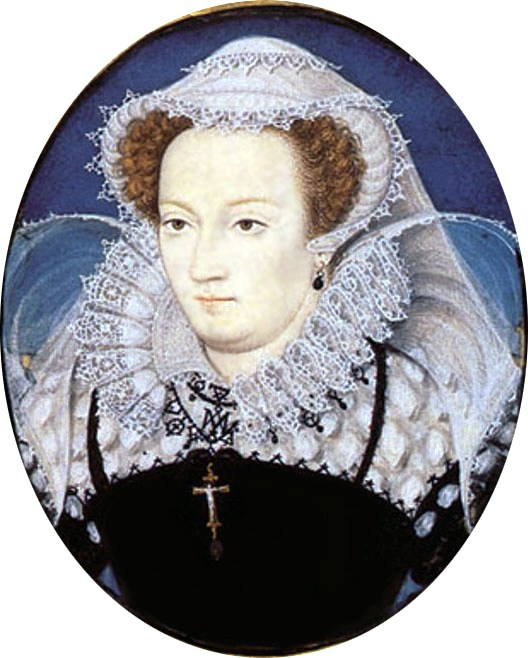
Mary, Queen of Scots, ca 1578

Francis Throckmorton (1554-1584) came from a prominent English Catholic family, his father John Throckmorton being a senior judge and witness to Queen Mary's will. While travelling in Europe with his brother Thomas from 1580 to 1583, they visited Paris and met with Catholic exiles Charles Paget and Thomas Morgan.

The Duke of Guise and Mary's supporters discussed ways forward. The Ruthven Raid in Scotland was a setback. Cash to fund the plot and planned invasion ("the enterprise") became available after the death of Antoinette of Bourbon, Duchess of Guise, in January 1583.

After returning to London in 1583, Francis Throckmorton carried messages between Mary, Queen of Scots, Morgan, and Bernardino de Mendoza, Philip II of Spain's ambassador in London. This correspondence was routed through the French embassy in London. Throckmorton also carried some letters written by Mary to the French ambassador Michel de Castelnau. An agent within the French embassy at Salisbury Court near Fleet Street, known as "Henry Fagot", notified Francis Walsingham, Elizabeth's Secretary of State.

Throckmorton was taken into custody in November, along with incriminating documents, including lists of English Catholic supporters. He was encoding a letter to Mary, Queen of Scots when he was arrested. After a few days, he was taken to the Tower of London. Another conspirator and letter carrier, George More, was also arrested and questioned, but released after making a deal with Walsingham.

Shortly before his arrest, Throckmorton managed to send a casket of other documents to Mendoza; it has been suggested this was exactly what Walsingham wanted him to do. Throckmorton was a relatively minor player, whose significance was to confirm the extent of Spanish involvement in seeking to overthrow Elizabeth.

Protected by diplomatic immunity, Mendoza was expelled in January 1584. He was the last Spanish ambassador to England during the Elizabethan era. Throckmorton was tortured with the rack, first on 16 November, to ensure he revealed as much information as possible. On 19 November, he confessed to giving the Spanish ambassador a list of suitable havens and ports on the English coast.

Throckmorton was put on trial on 21 May 1584 and executed on 10 July. His brother Thomas and many others managed to escape; some were imprisoned in the Tower of London, but Francis Throckmorton was the only one executed.

== Aftermath ==
Despite the arrest of Throckmorton and other conspirators in London, the French party led by the Duke of Guise were not unduly dismayed. They had heard that young king James VI was in favour of their plans to rescue his mother. However, Philip II now seemed reluctant to contribute to the invasion fund.

Unsurprisingly, Mary denied any knowledge of the plot. She was able to claim that she was not the author of letters coded in cipher by her secretaries. More of these letters were rediscovered and deciphered in 2023, and seem to implicate her. In June 1583, she asked the French ambassador Michel de Castelnau to apologise to Throckmorton for not writing to him in her own hand, and observed the potential for "great danger". A few months later, as the conspiracy unravelled, she offered money from her French dowry income to the Guises to maintain their interest in her cause after the fall of the Gowrie Regime in Scotland.

Mary was placed under strict confinement at Chartley Hall in Staffordshire. A new and stricter custodian Amias Paulet was appointed in January 1585. Walsingham and Lord Burghley drew up the Bond of Association, obliging all signatories to execute anyone who attempted to usurp the throne or to assassinate the Queen. Mary herself was one of the signatories and it provided the basis for her execution following the 1586 Babington Plot.

A servant of Mary, Queen of Scots, Jérôme Pasquier, was questioned by Thomas Phelippes in September 1586. He confessed to writing a letter in cipher for Mary to send to the French ambassador Castelnau asking him to negotiate a pardon for Francis Throckmorton.

Many participants in the Babington and Gunpowder Plots were related by blood or marriage to Francis Throckmorton, among them Robert Catesby and Francis Tresham. Bess Throckmorton (1565-1647) secretly married Sir Walter Raleigh (1554-1618).

A ballad celebrating the discovery of the plot compared Elizabeth's escape to the survival of Shadrach, Meshach, and Abednego in Nebuchadnezzar's fiery furnace.

== Sources ==
- Butler, Charles (1822). "The Treason of Francis Throckmorton". In Milner, John (ed.). Historical Memoirs of the English, Irish, and Scottish Catholics, Since the Reformation. pp. 376–377. OCLC 588795283.
- Lotherington, John, ed. (1994). The Tudor Years. Hodder and Stoughton. ISBN 0-340-53794-9.
- O'Day, Rosemary (1995). The Tudor Age. England: Longman Group Limited.
- Wagner, John A.; Schmid, Susan Valters (2012). Encyclopedia of Tudor England. Vol. I. Santa Barbara, CA: ABC-CLIO, LLC. ISBN 978-1-59884-299-9.
- Wagner, John A (1999). Historical Dictionary of the Elizabethan World: Britain, Ireland, Europe, and America. New York: The Onyx Press. ISBN 978-1-57356-200-3.
- Warren, John (2002). Elizabeth I: Religion and Foreign Affairs. Singapore: Hodder Murray. ISBN 978-0-340-84689-6.
