= Jane Lane =

Jane Lane may refer to:

- Jane Lane, Lady Fisher (c. 1626–1689), helped Charles II of England to escape in 1651
- Jane Lane (author) (1905–1978), British historical novelist
- Jane Lane (Daria), fictional character on the MTV cartoon show Daria
