= A Traveller in Time =

1939 children's novel

- A Traveller in Time, first edition
- Author: Alison Uttley
- Illustrator: Phyllis Bray
- Language: English
- Genre: Children's fiction; Historical fiction; Time travel
- Published: 1939
- Publication place: United Kingdom
- Media type: Print (hardback)
- Pages: 311 (1st edition)
- OCLC: 1071808488

A Traveller in Time is a 1939 children's time-slip novel by Alison Uttley. It is set in rural Derbyshire, in both the Edwardian (primary time) and Elizabethan (secondary time) eras. The main action takes place in the early 1580s, with the protagonist Penelope getting involved in a failed attempt to rescue Mary, Queen of Scots from her imprisonment, foreshadowing the Babington Plot.

== Plot ==
Penelope Taberner Cameron, an adolescent girl living in Edwardian Chelsea, is sent to convalesce at Thackers, her aunt's farmhouse in Derbyshire. During her stays, she is transported back in time to the early 1580s - sometimes this happens during her dreams, sometimes by going through a door that appears from time to time. Penelope meets her Taberner ancestors, who work as domestic servants to Anthony Babington and his household, and begins to fall in love with Anthony's younger brother Francis. Anthony is plotting to free Mary, Queen of Scots while she is being held in Wingfield Manor; the plot involves clearing out and using ancient tunnels between Thackers and Wingfield Manor. The authorities get wind of the rescue attempt and investigate, but the conspirators are not caught - a fortuitous snowfall conceals the evidence of recent excavations.

== Development history ==
Collins had asked Uttley for a children's historical novel in 1937; she started writing A Traveller in Time after reading one of her son's books about Mary, Queen of Scots. It was originally developed as a straight historical novel, The Secret of Thackers, but this was rejected by Collins in March 1938, as was, in October 1938, the subsequent rewrite that included the time travel element. Uttley then took it to Faber & Faber, who published it in 1939. An outline for a sequel exists, but was never published.

=== Publication history ===
- 1939, United Kingdom, Faber & Faber, hardback
- 1940, United States, Putnam
- 1964, United States, Viking Press
- 1977, United Kingdom, Puffin Books ISBN 0140309314, pub. date 26 May 1977, paperback

== Reception ==
Agnes Mackenzie reviewed A Traveller in Time in the Times Literary Supplement when it was first published, noting both the rural idyll - "the rich quiet colour of country England" - forming the novel's background and Uttley's choice of historical setting: not during the well-known Babington Plot of 1586, but a less well-known precursor. Margery Fisher, praising it as an "exquisite novel", noted that Uttley had drawn on the experience of her own dreams as a child living in a farmhouse similar to Thackers to write the book. Brian Alderson noted the meagre explanations of Penelope's appearances in and disappearances from the Elizabethan era, and her anachronistic clothing and speech, but conceded that to attempt to explain them in any detail would interrupt the story's languid pace. Lucy Mangan included the novel in her Guardian column A book lover's guide to building a brilliant children's library.

== Adaptations ==
The BBC adapted the novel for children's television as a five episode drama; it aired weekly on a Wednesday from 4 January 1978 to 1 February 1978. The adaptation starred Sophie Thompson in her television debut as Penelope Taberner Cameron, and Simon Gipps-Kent as Francis Babington. Elizabeth Bradley appeared in the dual role of Aunt Tissie and Cicely Taberner, Gerald James as Uncle Barnabas, and Heather Chasen as Mary Queen of Scots.
