= Michel de Castelnau =

French soldier and diplomat (c. 1520–1592)

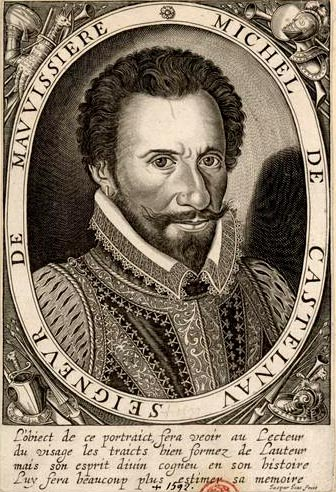
Michel de Castelnau, by Jaspar Isaac

Michel de Castelnau, Sieur de la Mauvissière (c. 1520–1592) was a French soldier and diplomat, ambassador to Queen Elizabeth I. He wrote a memoir covering the period between 1559 and 1570.

== Life ==
He was born in La Mauvissière (now part of Neuvy-le-Roi, Indre-et-Loire), Touraine about 1520. He was a son of Jean de Castelnau and Jeanne Dusmesnil, one of a family of nine children. His grandfather, Pierre de Castelnau, had been Equerry (Master of the Horse) to Louis XII.

Endowed with a clear and penetrating intellect and remarkable strength of memory, he received a careful education, capped off with travels in Italy and a long stay at Rome. He then spent some time in Malta and afterwards entered the army. His first acquaintance with war was in the campaigns of the French in Italy. His abilities and his courage won him the friendship and protection of Charles, Cardinal of Lorraine, who took him into his service.

In 1557 a command in the navy was given to him, and the cardinal proposed to get him knighted. This, however, he declined, and then rejoined the French army in Picardy. Various delicate missions requiring tact and discretion were entrusted to him by the Constable, Anne de Montmorency, and these he discharged so satisfactorily that he was sent by the king, Henry II, to Scotland with dispatches for Mary of Guise, the mother of Mary, Queen of Scots, who was betrothed to the Dauphin (afterwards Francis II).

From Scotland he passed into England in 1559, and treated with Queen Elizabeth respecting her claims on Calais, a settlement of which was effected at the congress of Le Cateau-Cambrésis. He was next sent as ambassador to the princes of Germany, for the purpose of prevailing upon them to withdraw their favor from the Protestants. This embassy was followed by missions to Margaret of Austria, governess of the Netherlands, to Savoy, and then to Rome, to ascertain the views of Pope Paul IV in regard to France. Paul having died just before his arrival, Castelnau used his influence in favor of the election of Pius IV. Returning to France, he once more entered the navy, and served under his former patron. It was his good fortune, at Nantes, to discover the earliest symptoms of the Conspiracy of Amboise, which he immediately reported to the government.

After the death of Francis II in December 1560, he accompanied Mary, Queen of Scots, to Scotland. He remained with her a year, during which time he made several journeys into England in an attempt to bring about a reconciliation between Mary and Queen Elizabeth. The wise and moderate counsel that he offered to the former were unheeded.

In 1562, as a consequence of the civil war in France, he returned there. He was employed against the Protestants in Brittany, was taken prisoner in an engagement with them and sent to Havre, but was soon after exchanged. In the midst of the excited passions of his countrymen, Castelnau, who was a sincere Roman Catholic, maintained a wise self-control and moderation, and by his counsels rendered valuable service to the government. He served at the siege of Rouen, distinguished himself at the battle of Dreux, took Tancarville, and contributed in 1563 to the recapture of Havre from the English.

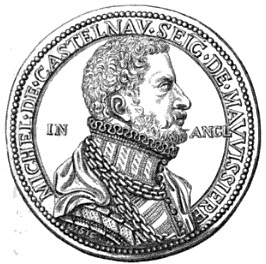
Portrait medal of Michel de Castelnau, Sieur de la Mauvissière, by Steven van Herwijck, 1565

=== England and Scotland in the 1560s ===
During the next ten years Castelnau was employed in various important missions: first to Queen Elizabeth to negotiate a peace. In March 1564, Castelnau visited Scotland to encourage Mary, Queen of Scots, to marry a French Duke. After Mary married to Lord Darnley in July 1565, he was involved in diplomatic responses to her troubles during the Chaseabout Raid and he visited her at Holyroodhouse. He returned to Edinburgh following the murder of David Rizzio.

In April 1566, he went to see Mary at Edinburgh Castle during her pregnancy. Castelnau brought letters for Darnley, who wrote to Catherine de' Medici to thank her, taking the opportunity to insist he was innocent of the "horrible crime" of Rizzio's murder.

=== Wars of Religion ===
Castelnau was sent to the Duke of Alba, the new governor of the Netherlands. On this occasion he discovered the project formed by the Prince of Condé and Admiral Coligny to seize and carry off the royal family at Monceaux (1567). After the battle of St. Denis he was again sent to Germany to solicit aid against the Protestants; and on his return he was rewarded for his services with the post of governor of Saint-Dizier and a company of orderlies. At the head of his company he took part in the battles of Jarnac and Moncontour.

== Ambassador in London ==
In 1572 he was sent to England by Charles IX to allay the excitement created by the St. Bartholomew's Day Massacre, and the same year he was sent to Germany and Switzerland. In September 1575, he was reappointed by Henry III ambassador to Queen Elizabeth, as a successor to Bertrand de Salignac de la Mothe-Fénelon, and he remained at her court for ten years. During this period in London, Castelnau used his influence to promote the marriage of Queen Elizabeth with the Duke of Alençon, with a view especially to strengthen and maintain the alliance of the two countries but Elizabeth made so many promises only to break them that at last he refused to accept them or communicate them to his government.

In England, Castelnau's wife Marie had difficult pregnancies and miscarriages and she crossed and recrossed the English channel to see physicians in France, at great expense. Elizabeth I was godmother to their son and daughter, and gave christening gifts including, in January 1577, a gilt double cup decorated with leopard heads.

The Italian philosopher Giordano Bruno was a member of the Castelnau household in London for two years. Bruno dedicated three dialogues on the infinite nature of the universe to Castelnau. A suggestion that Bruno leaked confidential information from the embassy in this period, proposed by the historian John Bossy, has not gained much acceptance. John Bossy's conclusion that Laurent Feron was an embassy mole, passing information to Francis Walsingham remains unchallenged. Another Italian writer and linguist, John Florio, worked for Castelnau between 1583 and 1585. Florio was also the tutor of his daughter Katherine Maria.

== Mary, Queen of Scots, and letters in code ==
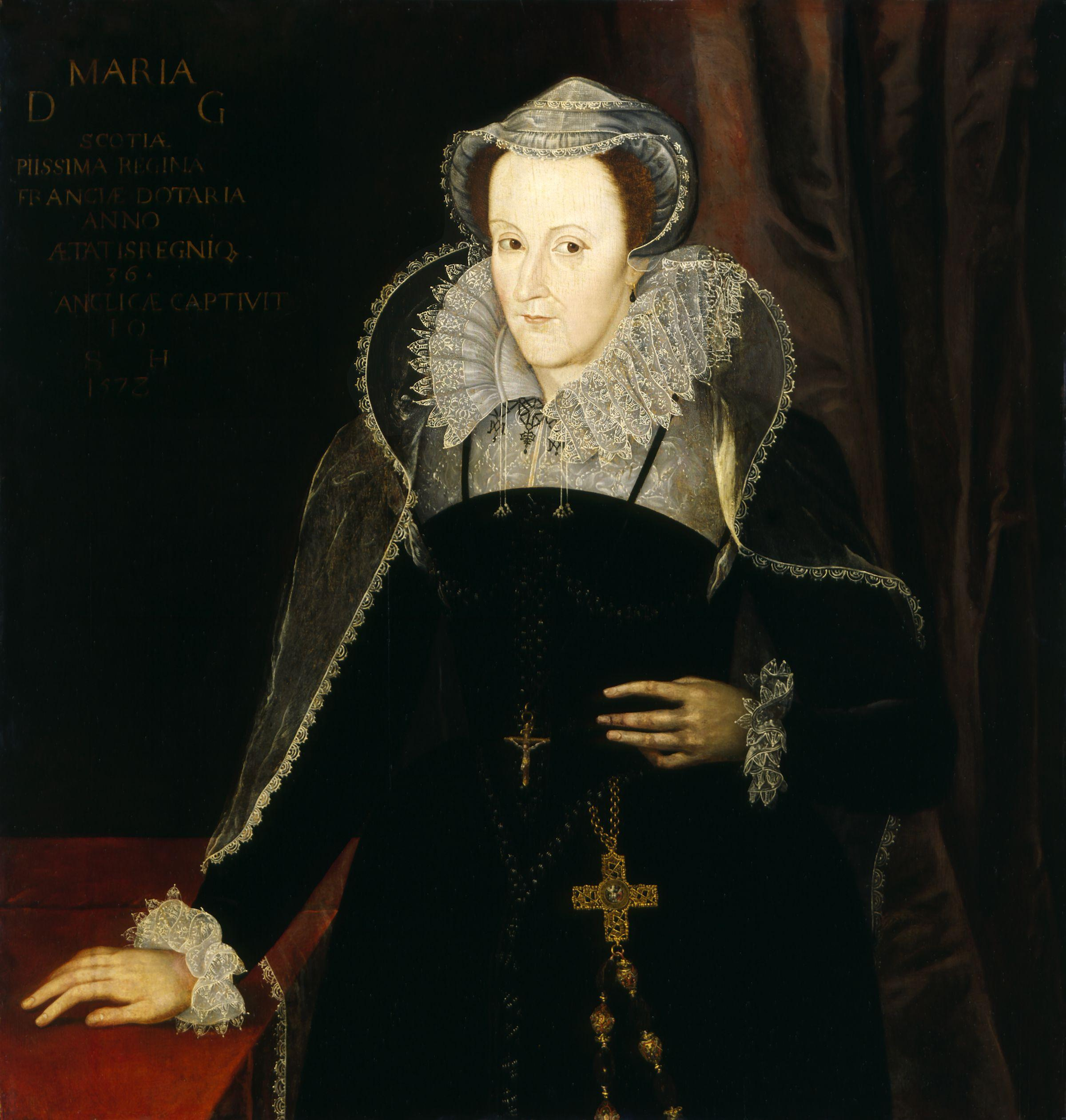
Mary, Queen of Scots, wrote many letters to Castelnau

In London, Castelnau de Mauvissière resided at Salisbury Court near Fleet Street or Butcher Row near the Strand. Mary, Queen of Scots, sent letters to him from captivity at Sheffield Manor and Castle. He presented her letters to Elizabeth I. Castelnau's wife, Marie, sent Mary fabrics to make clothes, and helped to find women to join her household. Mary called her "ma commère", meaning her namesake. Mary regarded Castelnau's daughter as her godchild and mignonne. She sent her a jewel which had been a present to her from Henry II of France.

=== What Mary wants ===
Castelnau showed some of Mary's letters to William Fowler, and he informed Francis Walsingham. Mary had written that she was not Elizabeth's prisoner, but a captive of the Lord Treasurer, William Cecil. Mary wrote secret letters in cipher to Castelnau complaining of her bad treatment, in 1581 asking for French money, soldiers, and artillery to be supplied according to the traditional Auld Alliance between England and Scotland. Frustrated by the apparent lack of support from France, Mary wrote to Castelnau in July 1581 that she could choose to negotiate with Spain instead.

In 1582, Mary hoped that Castelnau's negotiations would lead to her release and an "association" with her son. In the short term, she wanted Castelnau to obtain permission for visits to Buxton for her health. Mary's physician, Dominique Bourgoing, kept Castelnau informed of Mary's illnesses. Castelnau also interceded with Elizabeth I for delivery of clothes, letters, and preserves from France.

Castelnau's letters kept Mary informed of events in France. Castelnau helped get a passport for Jean Champhuon, sieur du Ruisseau, her French chamberlain and a brother-in-law of Mary's secretary Claude Nau, so he could travel and help her in affairs. Ruisseau was a lawyer and a member of the council for Mary's estates, based in Paris.

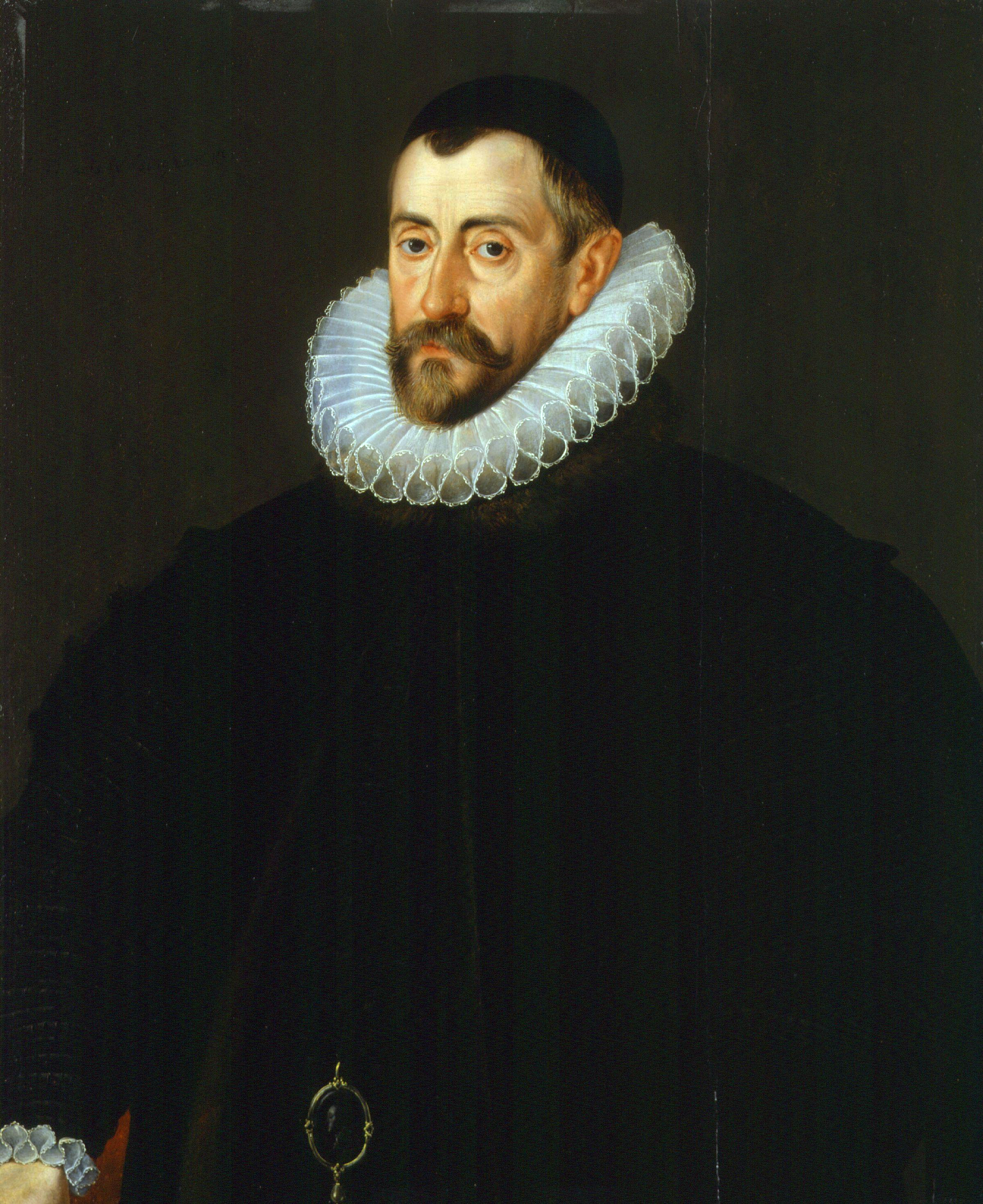
Francis Walsingham was able to monitor Castelnau's correspondence

=== Responses to the Raid of Ruthven ===
Some of Castelnau's letters to Scotland were intercepted and examined and copied by English diplomats including Robert Beale. Following the arrest of George Douglas of Helenhill in September 1582, Elizabeth I was told that Castelnau secretly conveyed letters to Mary, and to her supporters in Scotland. Walsingham asked the ambassador in France, Henry Cobham, to advise Henry III of France and the Queen Mother, Catherine de' Medici, of the situation, and that their representative in England could be more circumspect in the handling of Mary's letters. Elizabeth had no wish to foment further disquiet in Scotland following the recent pro-English Raid of Ruthven. Cobham was told that Castelnau's actions were doubtless correct and in accord with the traditional Auld Alliance or amity.

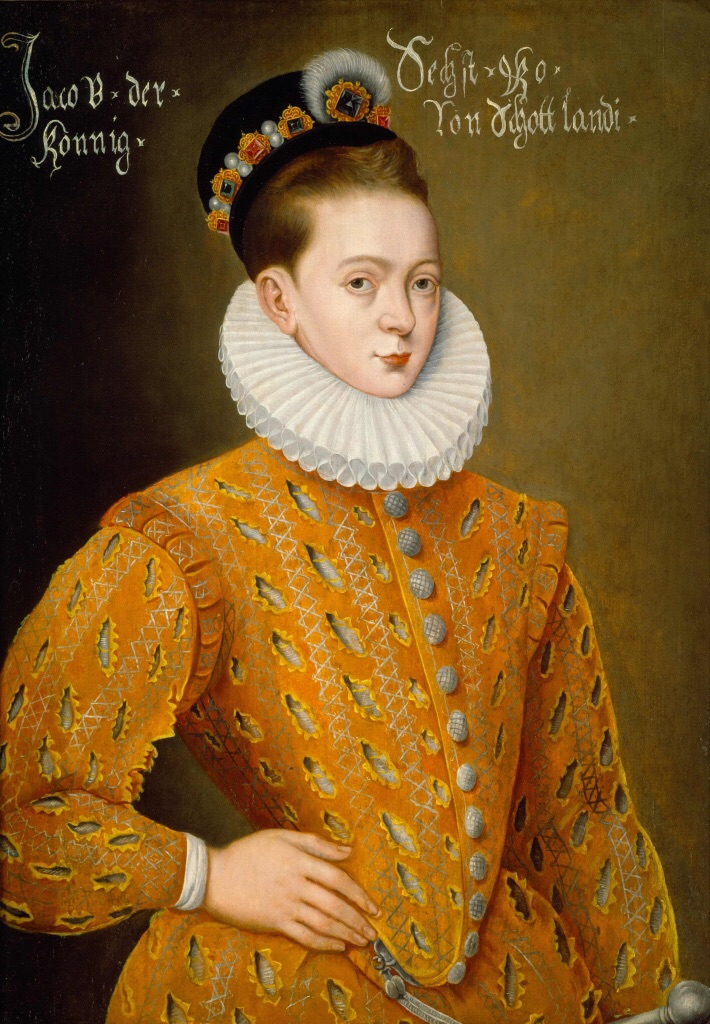
Mary asked Castelnau about a portrait painter working for James VI in a coded letter.

Mary sent several letters to Castelnau, some in cipher, hoping for a strong French response against the Ruthven Regime. In April 1583, Willam Cecil made a list of Castelnau's previous letters and communications with a Scottish intriguer Archibald Douglas and the favourite of James VI, Esmé Stewart, 1st Duke of Lennox. A spy using the name "Henry Fagot" offered to bribe Castelnau's secretary to keep Francis Walsingham informed of ciphered letters and the key to the lettre quartallé or cartelée code used in his correspondence with Mary, Queen of Scots. Castelnau sent copies of his correspondence with Mary, Queen of Scots, to Walsingham in September 1584, to aid forthcoming negotiations.

=== Code work in Mary's household ===
Mary asked Castelnau to take special care of her secret correspondence and pay the couriers well. He should pretend the money was for gold and silver embroidery thread. She sent cipher keys or alphabets to his secretary Claude de Courcelles. Mary also advocated the use of invisible ink, made with alum. In 2023 around 57 coded letters to Castelnau from Mary, Queen of Scots, were discovered in the Bibliothèque nationale de France and deciphered. The letters were probably put into cipher by Mary's secretaries Gilbert Curle, Claude Nau, and Jérôme Pasquier, who was variously recorded as master of her wardrobe, a groom of her chamber, a clerk and a household treasurer. Alexandre Labanoff, a 19th-century editor of Mary's letters, was unable to find a key for this cipher.

Curle, Nau, and Pasquier were taken to the Tower of London in September 1586 during the discovery of the Babington Plot. Amias Paulet had noticed that Pasquier was "half a secretary". Pasquier was asked by Thomas Phelippes about recent intrigues, the older Throckmorton Plot, and the ciphering process. In his second interview, Pasquier said he "wrote many times in cipher to Mauvissière, the late French ambassador". Nau was in charge of the alphabets or cipher keys, Mary herself kept the letters in cipher. Questioned again, he confessed to ciphering and deciphering letters for Mary and "also having deciphered many other letters written by Monsieur de Mauvissière" and others. After Mary's funeral in August 1587, all three men were released and given passports to leave England.

=== Throckmorton Plot ===
The Throckmorton Plot was revealed late in 1583. Some of Mary's secret letters to Castelnau were carried by Francis Throckmorton to Claude de Courcelles. In the ciphered texts Throckmorton was given the codename or alias Monsieur de la Tour. Another of Castelnau's secretaries, Jean Arnault de Chérelles (died 1637), who was trusted by Mary, or Nicolas Leclerc de Courcelles, and a clerk, Laurent Feron, passed copies of Castelnau's correspondence to Walsingham. Chérelles's brother had a place in Mary's household, as treasurer. The French ambassador De Maisse noted in 1598 that it was said the Babington Plot was discovered because Cherelles revealed Mary's ciphers.

The wider intrigue discovered by Walsingham involving Throckmorton, and a letter carrier, George More, is known as the Throckmorton Plot. The alleged objective was to facilitate a Spanish invasion of England, assassinate Elizabeth, and put Mary on the English throne.

The revelation of this plot in November 1583 weakened Castelnau's position as a diplomat. Later, in September 1586, Mary's servant Jérôme Pasquier confessed to writing a letter in cipher for Mary to Castelnau asking him to negotiate a pardon for Francis Throckmorton in a prisoner exchange. Throckmorton was executed.

=== Mary's Association ===
In August 1584, Castelnau was involved in plans for Mary's secretary Claude Nau to come to London and meet Elizabeth I as a diplomat. Nau would discuss Mary's scheme for her "association" with James VI. Castelnau offered to fully cooperate with Francis Walsingham and in September sent Walsingham his recent correspondence with Mary. He told Walsingham of a plan to send Charles de Prunelé, Baron d'Esneval as a diplomat to Scotland. Castelnau was reluctant to act with Nau in these discussions, as Mary wished, because his involvement with Mary had made Elizabeth suspicious of him. Walsingham accepted that Castelnau was now better aligned with English policy and asked an English diplomat Edward Stafford to try and ensure Castelnau was not replaced.

=== Final months in London ===
In February 1585 Castelnau wrote to Mary's son, James VI. He reported Mary's optimism and her pleasure in her new lodgings at Tutbury Castle. She hoped to be freed and join James in an "association", a joint rule. Castelnau thought he would be sent to Scotland to help reconcile the three nations of Scotland, England, and France. This mission did not take place.

His secretary Courcelles (also known as De Preau) came into suspicion for double-dealing in March 1585. He was alleged to have carried letters to the would-be assassin William Parry. He continued to carry letters for Mary after Castelnau's departure from England. Elizabeth heard that Castelnau had banished him for misconduct.

When Castelnau returned to France in September 1585, he wrote to Francis Walsingham that he was sending John Florio to court to thank Elizabeth I for the gifts of silver plate that he had received. The boat carrying Castelnau's luggage and treasures home was sunk by pirates. The new French ambassador in London was Guillaume de l'Aubespine de Châteauneuf, who inherited packets of unsent ciphered letters to Mary.

== France ==
On his return to France he found that his château of La Mauvissière had been destroyed in the civil war; and as he refused to recognize the authority of the League, the Duke of Guise deprived him of the governorship of Saint-Dizier. He was thus brought almost to a state of destitution but on the accession of Henry IV, the king, who knew his worth, and was confident that although he was a Catholic he might rely on his fidelity, gave him a command in the army, and entrusted him with various confidential missions.

== Death and legacy ==
Castelnau died at Joinville in 1592. His Mémoires rank very high among the original authorities for the period they cover, the eleven years between 1559 and 1570. They were written during his last embassy in England for the benefit of his son; and they possess the merits of clearness, veracity and impartiality. They were first printed in 1621; again, with additions by Le Laboreur, in 2 vols. folio, in 1659; and a third time, still further enlarged by Jean Godefroy, 3 vols. folio, in 1731. Castelnau translated into French the Latin work of Ramus, On the Manners and Customs of the Ancient Gauls. Various letters of his are preserved in the Cottonian and Harleian collections in the British Museum.

Castelnau married Marie, a daughter of another diplomat Jacques Bochetel de la Forest and a lady in waiting to Catherine de' Medici. Their portraits were engraved by Jean Rabel and Thomas de Leu in the 1580s. She died in December 1586 in Paris. Their grandson, Jacques de Castelnau (1620–1658), distinguished himself in the war against Austria and Spain during the ministries of Richelieu and Mazarin, and died a Marshal of France.
