= Henry Donn =

English Babington plotter (d.1586)

Henry Donn (otherwise Henry Dunn) (died 21 September 1586) was one of the conspirators executed for his involvement in the Babington Plot, a plot in 1586 to assassinate Queen Elizabeth, a Protestant, and put Mary, Queen of Scots, a Catholic, on the English throne.

Dunn came from a fairly wealthy Catholic family. He was the son of Christopher Dunn, of Addington, Kent. All parish records give the name as Dunn. The Lord of the manor was Thomas Watton (1547–1622), married to Martha Roper, a great-granddaughter of Sir Thomas More. Watton was fined for recusancy during the reign of James I, but towards the end of his life joined the Church of England. (Calendar of State Papers Domestic, 1603–1610). Henry would have been one of Christopher Dunn's youngest children, as three of his siblings married at Addington Church between 1570 and 1576. In "A brief account of the many Rebellions & Conspiracies against Queen Elizabeth etc. etc.", Henry Dunne is described as clerk in the Office of First Fruits and Tenths. (Calendar of State Paper, Domestic, 1581–1590).

Henry Dunn's final address from the scaffold and his execution were recorded in the Calendar of Scottish Papers, 1547–1603, ed. William K. Boyd, Vol. IV, 1586-8 under: 1586 Sep 21: Confession of Salusburie and others. Part of Dunn's address follows:

"I lyved here joyfullie and pleasantlie under her majestie, and tenne weeks agoe I mette with Anthonie Babington, who toulde me of all his treasons and devises, & he urged me thereunto to give my consent, but I refused and disswaded him also. Then he toulde me that I was one whom he loved well, & therefore he woulde bestowe me we^{m} (SIC). And soe urged me againe. And to confes a truthe, I said I would doe the best I coulde and consented." At the end of his confession, in which he used the word "sorrowfull" four times, he begged: "Last of all I hastelie aske my prince forgiveness & I praie she & one & all maie be eternized with eternall blessedness." He then politely refused to say the Lord's Prayer in English and intoned it in Latin before being "thrown off the ladder, where he hanged until he was thoroughlie dead". Henry Dunn's father had also been examined, on 10 August 1586, but he denied any knowledge of the affair and was exonerated.
