= Christopher Hodgson (priest) =

English priest

- Born: 1561; England
- Died: after 1596; Unknown
- Education: English College, Douai; English College, Rome
- Known for: Minor role in the Babington Plot; association with Gilbert Gifford

Christopher Hodgson (1561 – after 1596) was a Catholic priest who played a minor role in the Babington Plot (Pollen 1922, Smith 1936, Thomas 1996). The plot was a failure and eighteen of the main conspirators were hung, drawn, and quartered in London in 1586. Hodgson was a committed Roman Catholic, in defiance of the Elizabethan authorities. But he clashed with the Jesuits and like several other English Catholics he opposed a Spanish invasion. He was a close friend of Gilbert Gifford and an acquaintance of Charles Neville, 6th Earl of Westmorland in exile.

== Early life ==
The records concerning his ordination suggest that Christopher Hodgson was born in 1561 (Anstruther 1968, p. 168). Surviving letters in the English State Papers confirm that his father was also called Christopher. Christopher the elder was a tenant farmer in Altham, Lancashire where he died on 23 September 1590. His will survives in Lancashire Record Office in Preston.

Parish records show the baptism of a Christopher Hodgson, son of Christopher Hodgson, in Kendal in Westmorland on 12 December 1561. If this record applies to the future priest, then Christopher would have moved from Kendal to Altham when he was a young boy. Another Christopher Hodgson was baptised in Whalley in Lancashire on 21 January 1561. But no father is named.

In any case, the future priest attended Blackburn Grammar School in the 1570s (Anstruther 1968, p. 168). He was taught by Lawrence Yates "who ran a very popish school" (Anstruther, 1968, p. 168). A surviving letter in the English State Papers shows a very close relationship with Laurence Johnson, a Catholic martyr who was executed at Tyburn in 1582 and later beatified.

== Priesthood and the Babington Plot ==
Christopher left England with Laurence Johnson in 1578 to study at the English College, Douai. He was sent to Rome in 1579 where he ordained as a priest in 1583. For reasons of illness his mission back to England was aborted. Instead he journeyed to Rheims in France to teach philosophy at the English College there. His anti-Jesuit views led to antagonism with Richard Barret, the Jesuit president of the college (Anstruther, 1968, p. 168).

Hodgson became friendly with Gilbert Gifford, who as a double agent played a crucial role in the Babington Plot. One of the captured plotters (John Savage) later testified under interrogation that Hodgson had, with Gifford and others at Rheims in 1585, encouraged the assassination of Queen Elizabeth I of England (Smith 1936, p. 216). Savage confessed "that through the persuasion of Doctor Gifford, and by the solicitation of Gilbert Gifford and one Hodgson he undertook to kill the Queen's majesty and for that purpose was sent from Rheims hither."

When in England, Gilbert Gifford set up a means of communication between the imprisoned Mary, Queen of Scots, and her allies, knowing that her letters would be intercepted by Elizabethan spies. The evidence of these letters – forged or otherwise – led to her execution in 1587 (Smith 1936).

== 'Afterwards, Failing in His Purpose' ==
Before his death in prison in Paris in 1590, Gilbert Gifford wrote a letter to his brother Gerard dated 6 December 1588, which fell into the hands of the English authorities. This expresses Gilbert's 'affection' for Christopher Hodgson and reports that Hodgson had been lent £2000 by Charles Neville, 6th Earl of Westmorland. This Earl was exiled for his role in the pro-Catholic Rising of the North in 1569 (Sharp 1840). Dispossessed of all his estates, the Earl died in Flanders in 1601.

Hodgson stayed at Rheims until 1589 when he left to teach philosophy and theology in a monastery in Dieulouard in Lorraine, aiming to become the Abbot. The last definite reference to him, in a letter by Jesuit Priest Robert Parsons (or Persons), gives the following account of his wanderings:

"afterwards, failing in his purpose, and having no true spirit indeed, came out again, and after much wanderings up and down entangled with many ecclesiastical censures, came at length to such misery, and desperate resolution, as that when the assault should be given by the Spaniards to Calais in the year 1596, this man being there both ragged and torn, and in vagrant sort, told a certain grave man a little before the assault given, that he must be forced to enter also with the soldiers to snatch and catch as others did for his necessary relief, and what is become of him since I know not, nor whether he be dead or alive." (Catholic Record Society 1906, p. 205)

Hodgson's impoverished arrival in Calais, and his request to pillage with the Spanish soldiers, seems to indicate that he might be trying to return to England. Whether he did or not we do not know. Nothing is known of Hodgson's life after 1596.

== Bibliography ==
- Anstruther, Godfrey (1968) The Seminary Priests: A Dictionary of the Secular Clergy of England and Wales 1558–1850, vol. 1 (Gateshead: Northumberland Press).
- Catholic Record Society (1906) Miscellanea II (London: Arden Press).
- Pollen, John H. (1922) Mary Queen of Scots and the Babington Plot (Edinburgh: Scottish History Society).
- Sharp, Cuthbert (ed.) (1840) Memorials of the Rebellion (London: Nichols and Son).
- Smith, Alan Gordon (1936) The Babington Plot (London: Macmillan).
- Thomas, Logan (1996) The Greatest Treason (Standon, Herts.: Martlet Books).
