= Jerome Bellamy =

Recusant who supported the Babington plot

Jerome Bellamy (died 1586), of Uxenden Hall, near London, England, was a member of an old Roman Catholic recusant family noted for its hospitality to missionaries and fellow recusants.

== Life ==
Jerome Bellamy was a younger son of William and Katherine Bellamy. He was a warm sympathizer with Mary, Queen of Scots. In the latter years of the sixteenth century the Babington Plot to free Mary and assassinate her cousin Queen Elizabeth was exposed, and Babington, with two of his fellow-conspirators, Barnewell and Donne, sought refuge in Bellamy's house, Uxenden Hall. At first they took refuge in a hay barn, where Bellamy had food brought to them. He later admitted them to his house and was later arrested with them and accused of complicity in the plot. His widowed mother and a brother were also arrested; his brother committed suicide by hanging himself in the Tower.

Babington and his confederates, including Bellamy were indicted, tried, convicted on 15 September 1586, and sentenced to be hanged, drawn, and quartered. All told fourteen people were found guilty. Bellamy was taken to Tyburn on 21 September, however, the barbarity of the executions the previous day caused the Queen to forbid its repetition, and he and those with him were allowed to hang until they were dead.
