= Thomas Morgan (of Llantarnam) =

- Born: 1546; Monmouthshire, Wales
- Died: 1606 (aged 59–60); Amiens, France
- Known for: Confidant and agent of Mary, Queen of Scots; involvement in the Parry Plot and the Babington Plot
- Criminal charge(s): High treason (condemned in absentia, 1605)

Thomas Morgan of Llantarnam (or Bassaleg, a branch of the Morgan of Tredegar) (1546–1606), of the Welsh Morgan of Monmouthshire, was a confidant and spy for Mary, Queen of Scots, and was involved in the Babington Plot to kill Queen Elizabeth I.

== Early career ==
In his youth, Thomas, a staunch Catholic, worked as secretary of the Archbishop of York until 1568, and then for the Earl of Shrewsbury who had Mary under his care at this time. Morgan's Catholic leanings soon brought him into the confidence of the Scottish queen and Mary enlisted Morgan as her secretary and go-between for the period extending between 1569 -1572 which coincided with a series of important conspiracies against Elizabeth. Morgan was imprisoned for 3 years in the Tower of London before exiling himself to France. In 1577, he met and corresponded with the Catholic exile Anne Percy, Countess of Northumberland.

== The Parry Plot ==
Thomas Morgan had a secret correspondence with Mary, who was imprisoned in England, and he was plotting the assassination of Queen Elizabeth. In 1584 he may have been involved in the production of Leicester's Commonwealth, a scurrilous tract attacking Robert Dudley, 1st Earl of Leicester, Elizabeth's powerful favourite. The book was widely circulated in England. It contained a detailed argument that Mary should succeed Elizabeth to the throne. Francis Walsingham, the chief of Elizabeth's intelligence service, believed him to be the author.

In 1584, Morgan was dispatched to Paris with letters from Mary to her supporters at the French court. He met up with Dr. William Parry and the pair hatched a plan to kill the queen. Parry was arrested in England and charged with High Treason but he pleaded that he was a secret agent trying to discover the Catholic's treasons.

One of the charges brought against Mary in 1586 pertaining to her involvement with Morgan, charge no. 8, read 'Her Servant Morgan practising with Parry for the killing of her Majesty and the favouring and maintaining of him, since the said Queen did know that he was the principal persuader of Parry to attempt that most wicked act'. Morgan strenuously denied his involvement in his secret letters to Mary, who chose to believe him.

== Babington Plot ==
Morgan and Charles Paget recruited Anthony Babington, a young English nobleman ready to give his life for Mary, to murder Queen Elizabeth I in the famous Babington Plot. Lewes Lewkenor described Morgan as 'a man not inferior to any of them all in drifts of policy'.

In 1585 Gilbert Gifford arrived in Paris for a meeting with Morgan and Charles Paget, who sent him to England. Francis Walsingham's agents arrested him at the port of Rye, East Sussex and he was taken to London for questioning. It appears that Walsingham's persuasive techniques were enough to convince Gifford to spy for him and intercept the letters from Mary, Queen of Scots which ultimately brought about her downfall and subsequent execution. Gifford even told how Walsingham's chief decipherer, Phelippes 'could take off Morgan to the life'. Spying for Elizabeth in the embassy, Gifford was copying all of the letters exchanged between Thomas and Mary and passing them to Walsingham. Elizabeth's top codebreaker, Thomas Phelippes, was able to decipher the code used by Thomas Morgan. The plot was discovered, Babington was arrested, and he and his co-conspirators were hung, drawn and quartered. The Jesuits accused Morgan of being the 'setter on' of Gilbert Gifford and had him 'clapt close prisoner in a miserable dungeon called the Truerenborche' where he remained until the death of Alexander Farnese, Duke of Parma in December 1593. Thomas Morgan, escaping extradition and a dreadful fate, was thrown into the Bastille and then in another prison in Flanders before finally being set free in 1593.

== Exile and death ==
Morgan was accused of being an intelligencer for Walsingham by his fellow conspirators, Charles Paget, Thomas Throckmorton and Ralph Liggons. He was incarcerated in the Bastille, but his friends sought aid from the Pope who commanded his release. Morgan retired to live with the Bishop of Cusano Milanino in Amiens until his death, the date of which is uncertain. In January 1605, he was condemned to death for conspiracy, but the sentence was not carried out.
