= Jane Lane (author) =

English novelist and biographer (1905–1978)

Elaine Kidner in The Ghost Train in 1927

Elaine Dakers (née Kidner; 27 May 1905 – 6 January 1978) was an English historical novelist, biographer and actress. She began her career as an actress. In the 1930s, she began publishing books under the pseudonym Jane Lane covering the Stuart era and 18th-century Scotland from a Catholic and Royalist perspective.

== Biography ==
Elaine Kidner was born on 27 May 1905 in Ruislip, Middlesex, England. She was descended from Jane Lane, Lady Fisher. She married publisher Andrew Dakers.

Her novel, A State of Mind, is set in a dystopian future. The Tablet has described Lane as "one of the few contemporary writers who excel both as novelists and historians". Jane Lane died on 6 January 1978.

== Selected works ==
=== Novels ===
- Undaunted (1934)
- Be Valiant Still (1935)
- King's Critic (1935)
- Prelude to Kingship (1936)
- Sir Devil-May-Care (1937) (English Civil War)
- He Stooped to Conquer (1944) (Massacre of Glencoe)
- Gin and Bitters (1945) (early 18th Century London and the South Sea Bubble)
- His Fight is Ours (1946) (background to the 1745 Rising)
- London Goes To Heaven (1947) (London under the Commonwealth and Protectorate)
- Parcel of Rogues: The Plot Against Mary of Scotland (1948) (Mary, Queen of Scots and the regencies)
- Fortress in the Forth (1950) (Jacobite prisoners on Bass Rock 1691–94)
- Dark Conspiracy (1951) (Rye House Plot against Charles II)
- The Sealed Knot (1952) (English Civil War)
- Lady of the House a.k.a. The Countess at War (1953) (English Civil War)
- The Phoenix and the Laurel (1954) (John Graham of Claverhouse)
- Thunder on St. Paul's Day (1956) (Titus Oates and the "Popish Plot")
- Conies in the Hay a.k.a. Rabbits in the Hay a.k.a. The Cross and the Tower (1957) (Babington Plot 1586)
- Sow the Tempest (1960) (Henry VIII's divorce from Catherine of Aragon)
- Farewell to the White Cockade (1961) (Bonnie Prince Charlie)
- The Crown for a Lie (1962) (How James II lost the throne)
- A State of Mind (1964) (post-atomic future)
- A Wind through the Heather (1965) (Highland Clearances)
- From the Snare of the Hunters (1968) (Last days of Jesus of Nazareth)
- The Young and Lonely King (1969) (Prince Charles, Duke of Albany)
- The Questing Beast (1970) (English Civil War)
- Ember in the Ashes (1970) (Roman Catholics in 18th century England)
- The Severed Crown (1972) (Charles I)
- Bridge of Sighs (1973) (Mary of Modena)
- Heirs of Squire Harry (1974) (Edward VI)
- A Summer Storm (1976) (Peasants' Revolt, 1381)
- A Secret Chronicle (1977) (Edward II)

=== The Escape series (for younger readers) ===
- The Escape of the King (1957) (The young Charles II)
- The Escape of the Queen (1957) (Mary, Queen of Scots)
- The Escape of the Prince (1958) (Bonnie Prince Charlie)
- The Escape of the Duke (1960) (Charles I's son James, Duke of York)
- The Escape of the Princess (1962) (Clementina Sobieski)

=== Non-fiction ===
- King James the Last (1942)
- Titus Oates (1949)
- Puritan, Rake and Squire (1950)
