= Babington Plot =

1586 plot to assassinate Elizabeth I

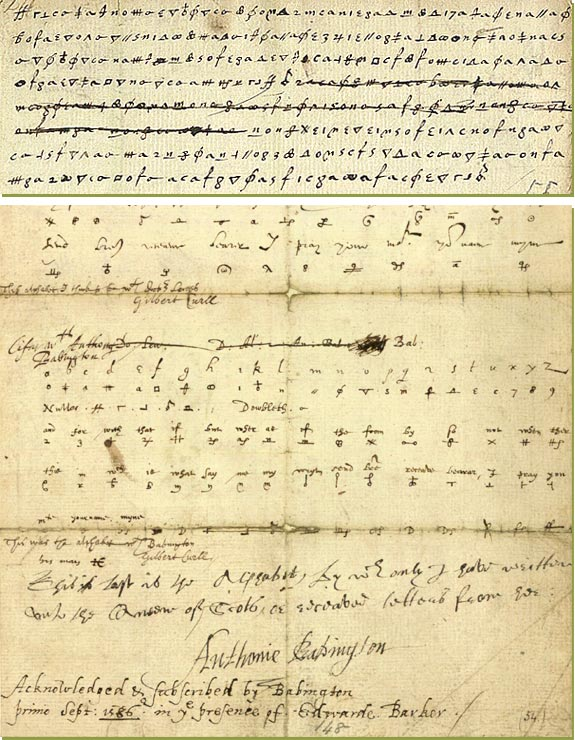
- Walsingham's "Decypherer" forged this cipher postscript to Mary's letter to Babington. It asks Babington to use the – broken – cipher to tell her the names of the conspirators.
- Date: 1586
- Location: England
- Type: Assassination plot Conspiracy
- Motive: Replace the Protestant Elizabeth I with the Catholic Mary, Queen of Scots, and restore Catholic rule in England
- Target: Queen Elizabeth I
- Organised by: Anthony Babington, John Ballard
- Participants: Anthony Babington, John Ballard, Mary, Queen of Scots, Thomas Morgan, Charles Paget
- Outcome: Plot uncovered by the intelligence network of Francis Walsingham; conspirators executed; Mary, Queen of Scots tried, convicted and executed in 1587

The Babington Plot was a plan in 1586 to assassinate Queen Elizabeth I, a Protestant, and put Mary, Queen of Scots, her Catholic cousin, on the English throne. It led to Mary's execution, a result of a letter sent by Mary (who had been imprisoned for 19 years since 1568 in England at the behest of Elizabeth) in which she consented to the assassination of Elizabeth.

The long-term goal of the plot was the invasion of England by the Spanish forces of King Philip II and the Catholic League in France, leading to the restoration of the old religion. The plot was discovered by Elizabeth's spymaster Sir Francis Walsingham and used to entrap Mary for the purpose of removing her as a claimant to the English throne.

The chief conspirators were Anthony Babington and John Ballard. Babington, a young recusant, was recruited by Ballard, a Jesuit priest who hoped to rescue the Scottish queen. Working for Walsingham were double agents Robert Poley and Gilbert Gifford, as well as Thomas Phelippes, a spy agent and cryptanalyst, and the Puritan spy Maliverey Catilyn. The turbulent Catholic deacon Gifford had been in Walsingham's service since the end of 1585 or the beginning of 1586. Gifford obtained a letter of introduction to Queen Mary from a confidant and spy for her, Thomas Morgan. Walsingham then placed double agent Gifford and spy decipherer Phelippes inside Chartley Castle, where Queen Mary was imprisoned. Gifford organised the Walsingham plan to place Babington's and Queen Mary's encrypted communications into a beer barrel cork which were then intercepted by Phelippes, decoded and sent to Walsingham.

On 7 July 1586, the only Babington letter that was sent to Mary was decoded by Phelippes. Mary responded in code on 17 July 1586 ordering the would-be rescuers to assassinate Queen Elizabeth. The response letter also included deciphered phrases indicating her desire to be rescued: "The affairs being thus prepared" and "I may suddenly be transported out of this place". At the Fotheringay trial in October 1586, Elizabeth's Lord High Treasurer William Cecil – Lord Burghley – and Walsingham used the letter against Mary, who refused to admit that she was guilty. However, Mary was betrayed by her secretaries Claude Nau and Gilbert Curle, who confessed under pressure that the letter was mainly truthful.

== Mary's imprisonment ==
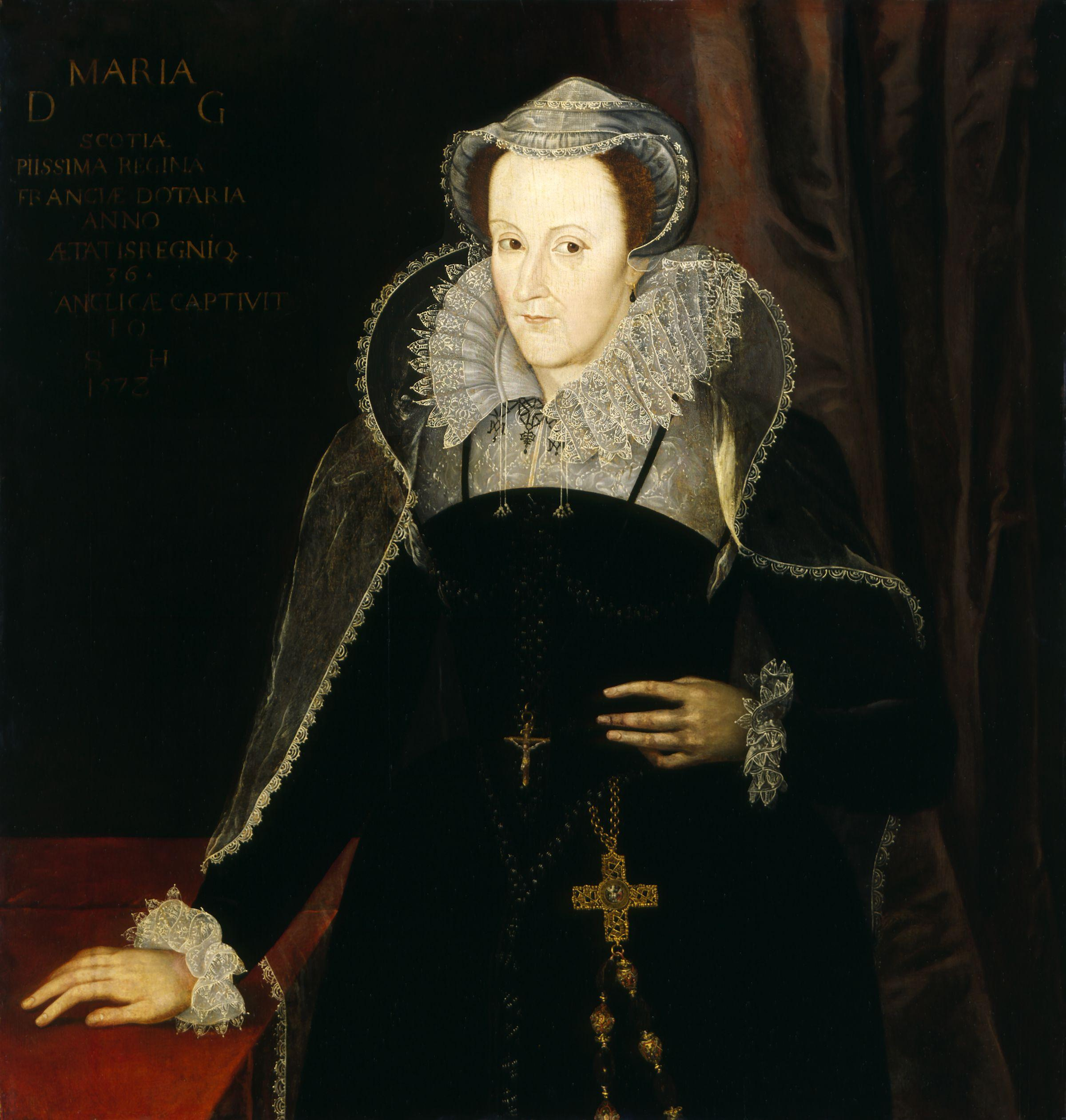
Mary in captivity, c. 1578

Mary, Queen of Scots, a Roman Catholic, was regarded by Roman Catholics as the legitimate heir to the throne of England. In 1568, she escaped imprisonment by Scottish rebels and sought the aid of her first cousin once removed, Queen Elizabeth I, a year after her forced abdication from the throne of Scotland. The issuance of the papal bull Regnans in Excelsis by Pope Pius V on 25 February 1570, granted English Catholics authority to overthrow the English queen. Queen Mary became the focal point of numerous plots and intrigues to restore England to its former religion, Catholicism, and to depose Elizabeth and even to take her life. Rather than rendering the expected aid, Elizabeth imprisoned Mary for nineteen years in the charge of a succession of jailers, principally the Earl of Shrewsbury.

In 1584, Elizabeth's Privy Council signed a "Bond of Association" designed by Cecil and Walsingham which stated that anyone within the line of succession to the throne on whose behalf anyone plotted against the Queen, would be excluded from the line and executed. This was agreed upon by hundreds of Englishmen, who likewise signed the Bond. Mary also agreed to sign the Bond. The following year, Parliament passed the Act of Association, which provided for the execution of anyone who would benefit from the death of the Queen if a plot against her was discovered. Because of the bond, Mary could be executed if a plot was initiated by others that could lead to her accession to England's throne.

In 1585, Elizabeth ordered Mary to be transferred in a coach and under heavy guard and placed under the strictest confinement at Chartley Hall in Staffordshire, under the control of Sir Amias Paulet. She was prohibited any correspondence with the outside world. Puritan Paulet was chosen by Queen Elizabeth in part because he abhorred Queen Mary's Catholic faith.

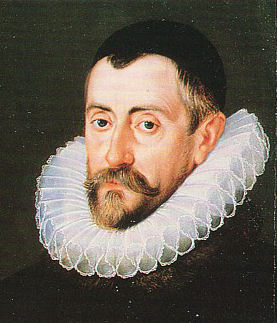
Sir Francis Walsingham

Reacting to the growing threat posed by Catholics, urged on by the pope and other Catholic monarchs in Europe, Francis Walsingham, Queen Elizabeth's Secretary of State and spymaster, together with William Cecil, Elizabeth's chief advisor, realised that if Mary could be implicated in a plot to assassinate Elizabeth, she could be executed and the papist threat diminished. As he wrote to the Earl of Leicester: "So long as that devilish woman lives, neither Her Majesty must make account to continue in quiet possession of her crown, nor her faithful servants assure themselves of safety of their lives." Walsingham used Babington to ensnare Queen Mary by sending his double agent, Gilbert Gifford to Paris to obtain the confidence of Morgan, then locked in the Bastille. Morgan previously worked for George Talbot, 6th Earl of Shrewsbury, an earlier jailer of Queen Mary. Through Shrewsbury, Queen Mary became acquainted with Morgan. Queen Mary sent Morgan to Paris to deliver letters to the French court. While in Paris, Morgan became involved in a previous plot designed by William Parry, which resulted in Morgan's incarceration in the Bastille. In 1585 Gifford was arrested returning to England while coming through Rye in Sussex with letters of introduction from Morgan to Queen Mary. Walsingham released Gifford to work as a double agent, in the Babington Plot. Gifford used the alias "No. 4" just as he had used other aliases such as Colerdin, Pietro and Cornelys. Walsingham had Gifford function as a courier in the entrapment plot against Queen Mary.

== Plot ==
The Babington plot was related to several separate plans:

- solicitation of a Spanish invasion of England with the purpose of deposing the Protestant Queen Elizabeth and replacing her with the Catholic Queen Mary;
- a plot to assassinate Queen Elizabeth.
- Mary would be freed by the plotters, perhaps while riding in open country near Chartley.

At the behest of Mary's French supporters, John Ballard, a Jesuit priest and agent of the Roman Church, went to England on various occasions in 1585 to secure promises of aid from the northern Catholic gentry on behalf of Mary. In March 1586, he met with John Savage, an ex-soldier who was involved in a separate plot against Elizabeth and who had sworn an oath to assassinate the queen. He was resolved in this plot after consulting with three friends: Dr. William Gifford, Christopher Hodgson and Gilbert Gifford. Gilbert Gifford had been arrested by Walsingham and agreed to be a double agent. Gifford was already in Walsingham's employ by the time Savage was going ahead with the plot, according to Conyers Read. Later that same year, Gifford reported to Charles Paget and the Spanish diplomat Don Bernardino de Mendoza, and told them that English Catholics were prepared to mount an insurrection against Elizabeth, provided that they would be assured of foreign support. While it was uncertain whether Ballard's report of the extent of Catholic opposition was accurate, what was certain is that he was able to secure assurances that support would be forthcoming. He then returned to England, where he persuaded a member of the Catholic gentry, Anthony Babington, to lead and organise the English Catholics against Elizabeth. Ballard informed Babington about the plans that had been so far proposed. Babington's later confession made it clear that Ballard was sure of the support of the Catholic League:

He told me he was retorned from Fraunce uppon this occasion. Being with Mendoza at Paris, he was informed that in regarde of the iniuries don by our state unto the greatest Christian princes, by the nourishinge of sedition and divisions in their provinces, by withholding violently the lawful possessions of some, by invasion of the Indies and by piracy, robbing the treasure and the wealthe of others, and sondry intolerable wronges for so great and mighty princes to indure, it was resolved by the Catholique league to seeke redresse and satisfaction, which they had vowed to performe this sommer without farther delay, havinge in readiness suche forces and all warlike preparations as the like was never scene in these partes of Christendome ... The Pope was chief disposer, the most Christian king and the king Catholic with all other princes of the league concurred as instruments for the righting of these wronges, and reformation of religion. The conductors of this enterprise for the French nation, the D. of Guise, or his brother the D. de Main; for the Italian and Hispanishe forces, the P. of Parma; the whole number about 60,000.

Despite this assurance of this foreign support, Babington was hesitant, as he thought that no foreign invasion would succeed for as long as Elizabeth remained, to which Ballard answered that the plans of John Savage would take care of that. After a lengthy discussion with friends and soon-to-be fellow conspirators, Babington consented to join and to lead the conspiracy.

Unfortunately for the conspirators, Walsingham was certainly aware of some of the aspects of the plot, based on reports by his spies, most notably Gilbert Gifford, who kept tabs on all the major participants. While he could have shut down some part of the plot and arrested some of those involved within reach, he still lacked any piece of evidence that would prove Queen Mary's active participation in the plot and he feared to commit any mistake which might cost Elizabeth her life.

=== Infiltration ===
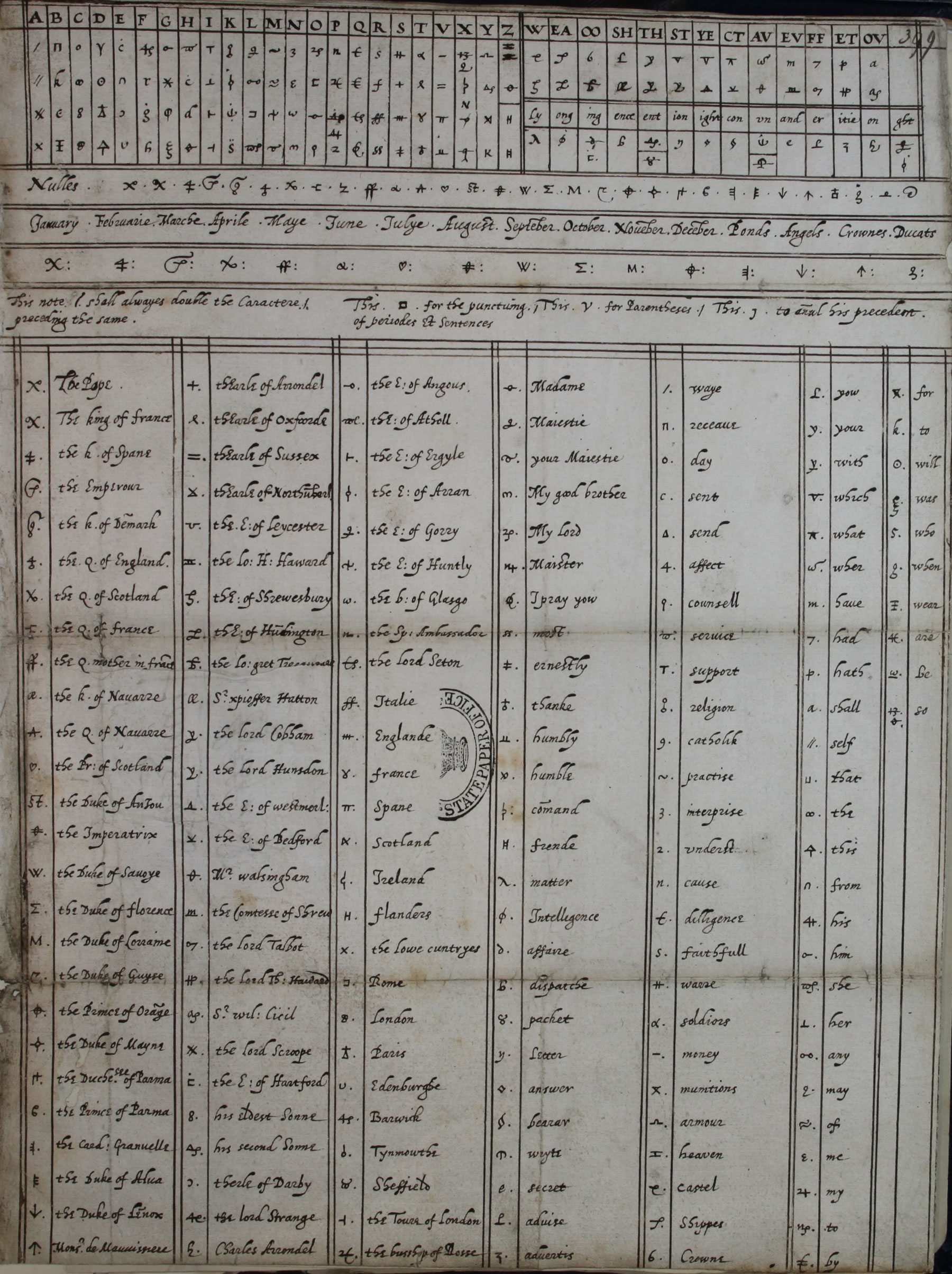
The cipher code of Mary, Queen of Scots

After the Throckmorton Plot, Queen Elizabeth had issued a decree in July 1584, which prevented all communication to and from Mary. However, Walsingham and Cecil realised that that decree also impaired their ability to entrap Mary. They needed evidence for which she could be executed based on their Bond of Association tenets. Thus Walsingham established a new line of communication, one which he could carefully control without incurring any suspicion from Mary. Gifford approached the French ambassador to England, Guillaume de l'Aubespine, Baron de Châteauneuf-sur-Cher, and described the new correspondence arrangement that had been designed by Walsingham. Gifford and jailer Paulet had arranged for a local brewer to facilitate the movement of messages between Queen Mary and her supporters by placing them in a watertight box inside a beer barrel. Thomas Phelippes, a cipher and language expert in Walsingham's employ, was then quartered at Chartley Hall to receive the messages, decode them and send them to Walsingham. Gifford submitted a code table (supplied by Walsingham) to Chateauneuf and requested the first message be sent to Mary.

All subsequent messages to Mary would be sent via diplomatic packets to Chateauneuf, who then passed them on to Gifford. Gifford would pass them on to Walsingham, who would confide them to Phelippes. The cipher used was a nomenclator cipher. Phelippes would decode and make a copy of the letter. The letter was then resealed and given back to Gifford, who would pass it on to the brewer. The brewer would then smuggle the letter to Mary. If Mary sent a letter to her supporters, it would go through the reverse process. In short order, every message coming to and from Chartley was intercepted and read by Walsingham.

== Correspondence ==
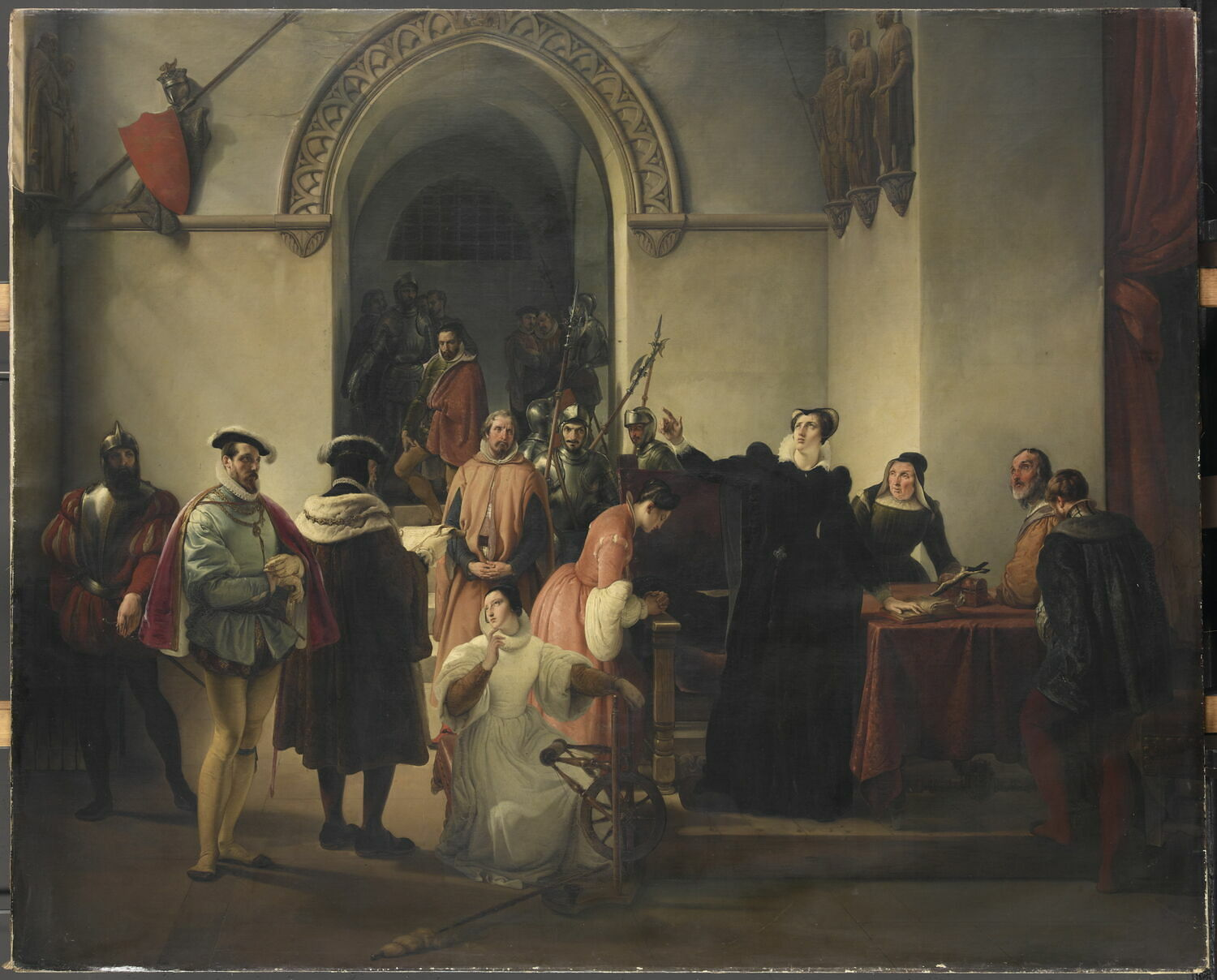
Mary Stuart Proclaiming Her Innocence by Francesco Hayez, 1832

Babington wrote to Mary:

Myself with ten gentlemen and a hundred of our followers will undertake the delivery of your royal person from the hands of your enemies. For the dispatch of the usurper, from the obedience of whom we are by the excommunication of her made free, there be six noble gentlemen, all my private friends, who for the zeal they bear to the Catholic cause and your Majesty's service will undertake that tragical execution.

This letter was received by Mary on 14 July 1586, who was in a dark mood knowing that her son had betrayed her in favour of Elizabeth, and three days later she replied to Babington in a long letter in which she outlined the components of a successful rescue and the need to assassinate Elizabeth. She also stressed the necessity of foreign aid if the rescue attempt was to succeed:

For I have long ago shown unto the foreign Catholic princes, what they have done against the King of Spain, and in the time the Catholics here remaining, exposed to all persecutions and cruelty, do daily diminish in number, forces, means and power. So as, if remedy be not thereunto speedily provided, I fear not a little but they shall become altogether unable for ever to rise again and to receive any aid at all, whensoever it were offered. Then for mine own part, I pray you to assure our principal friends that, albeit I had not in this cause any particular interest in this case... I shall be always ready and most willing to employ therein my life and all that I have, or may ever look for, in this world."

Mary, in her response letter, advised the would-be rescuers to confront the Puritans and to link her case to the Queen of England as her heir.

These pretexts may serve to found and establish among all associations, or considerations general, as done only for your preservation and defence, as well in religions as lands, lives and goods, against the oppressions and attempts of said Puritans, without directly writing, or giving out anything against the Queen, but rather showing yourselves willing to maintain her, and her lawful heirs after her, not naming me.

Mary was clear in her support for the murder of Elizabeth if that would have led to her liberty and Catholic domination of England. In addition, Queen Mary supported in that letter, and in another one to Ambassador Bernardino de Mendoza, a Spanish invasion of England.

The letter was again intercepted and deciphered by Phelippes. But this time, Phelippes, on the direction of Walsingham, kept the original and made a copy, adding a request for the names of the conspirators:

I would be glad to know the names and quelityes of the sixe gentlemen which are to accomplish the dessignement, for that it may be, I shall be able uppon knowledge of the parties to give you some further advise necessarye to be followed therein; and even so do I wish to be made acquainted with the names of all such principall persons ... as also from time to time particularlye how you proceede and as sone as you may for the same purpose who bee alredye and how farr every one privye hereunto.

== Arrests, trials and executions ==
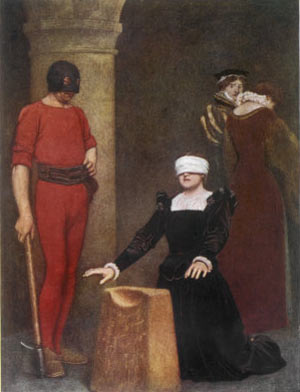
The execution of Queen Mary by James Dromgole Linton

John Ballard was arrested on 4 August 1586, and under torture he confessed and implicated Babington. Although Babington was able to receive the letter with the postscript, he was not able to reply with the names of the conspirators, as he was arrested. Others were taken prisoner by 15 August 1586. Mary's two secretaries, Claude Nau and Gilbert Curle, and a clerk Jérôme Pasquier were likewise taken into custody and interrogated. A large chest filled with Mary's papers seized at Chartley was taken to London.

The conspirators were sentenced to death for treason and conspiracy against the crown, and were to be hanged, drawn, and quartered. This first group included Babington, Ballard, Chidiock Tichborne, Thomas Salisbury, Henry Donn, Robert Barnewell and John Savage. A further group of seven men including Edward Habington, Charles Tilney, Edward Jones, John Charnock, John Travers, Jerome Bellamy, and Robert Gage, were tried and convicted shortly afterward. Ballard and Babington were executed on 20 September 1586 along with the other men who had been tried with them. Such was the public outcry at the horror of their execution that Elizabeth changed the order for the second group to be allowed to hang until "quite dead" before disembowelling and quartering.

In October 1586, Mary was sent to be tried at Fotheringhay Castle in Northamptonshire by 46 English lords, bishops and earls. She was not permitted legal counsel, not permitted to review the evidence against her, nor to call witnesses. Portions of Phellipes' letter translations were read at the trial. Mary denied knowing Babington and Ballard, but it was insisted that she had sent a reply to Babington using the same cipher code, entrusting the letter to a servant in a blue coat. Mary was convicted of treason against England. One English Lord voted not guilty. Elizabeth signed her cousin-once-removed's death warrant, and on 8 February 1587, in front of 300 witnesses, Mary, Queen of Scots, was executed by beheading.

In January 1598, a French diplomat in London, Huraut de Maisse, laid the blame for the discovery of the plot and Mary's execution on the ambassador Guillaume de l'Aubespine de Châteauneuf and his secretary Jean Arnault de Cherelles as they were held responsible for Elizabeth's agents obtaining Mary's ciphers.

== In literature ==
Mary Stuart (German: Maria Stuart), a dramatised version of the last days of Mary, Queen of Scots, including the Babington Plot, was written by Friedrich Schiller and performed in Weimar, Germany, in 1800. This in turn formed the basis for Maria Stuarda, an opera by Donizetti, in 1835. Although the Babington Plot occurs before the events of the opera, and is only referenced twice during the opera, the second such occasion being Mary admitting her own part in it in private to her confessor (a role taken by Lord Talbot in the opera, although not in real life).

The story of the Babington Plot is dramatised in the novel Conies in the Hay by Jane Lane (ISBN 0-7551-0835-3), and features prominently in Anthony Burgess's A Dead Man in Deptford. A fictional account is given in the My Story book series, The Queen's Spies (retitled To Kill A Queen 2008) told in diary format by a fictional Elizabethan girl, Kitty. The Babington plot forms the historical background – and provides much of the intrigue – for Holy Spy, the 7th in the historical detective series by Rory Clements, featuring John Shakespeare, an intelligencer for Walsingham and elder brother of the more famous Will.

The simplified version of the Babington plot is also the subject of the children's or Young Adult novel A Traveller in Time (1939), by Alison Uttley, who grew up near the Babington family home in Derbyshire. A young modern girl finds that she slips back to the time shortly before the Plot is about to be implemented. This was later made into a BBC TV mini-series in 1978, with small changes to the original novel.

The Babington Plot is dramatized in Robert DeMaria's 1976 historical novel To Be a King, which portrays the conspiracy within a fictionalized account of Christopher Marlowe's involvement in Elizabethan intelligence networks.

The Babington Plot is also dramatized in the 2017 Ken Follett novel A Column of Fire, in Jacopo della Quercia's 2015 novel License to Quill, and in SJ Parris's 2020 novel Execution, the latest of her novels featuring Giordano Bruno as protagonist.

The plot figures prominently in the first chapter of The Code Book, a survey of the history of cryptography written by Simon Singh and published in 1999.

== Dramatic adaptations ==
Episode four of the 1971 television miniseries Elizabeth R (titled "Horrible Conspiracies") is devoted to the Babington Plot. It is also depicted in the miniseries Elizabeth I (2005) and the films Mary, Queen of Scots (1971), Elizabeth: The Golden Age (2007) and Mary Queen of Scots (2018).

A 45-minute drama entitled The Babington Plot, written by Michael Butt and directed by Sasha Yevtushenko, was broadcast on BBC Radio 4 on 2 December 2008 as part of the Afternoon Drama. This drama took the form of a documentary on the first anniversary of the executions, with the story being told from the perspectives of Thomas Salisbury, Robert Poley, Gilbert Gifford and others who, while not conspirators, are in some way connected with the events, all of whom are interviewed by the Presenter (played by Stephen Greif). The cast also included Samuel Barnett as Thomas Salisbury, Burn Gorman as Robert Poley, Jonathan Taffler as Thomas Phelippes and Inam Mirza as Gilbert Gifford.

Episode one of the 2017 BBC miniseries Elizabeth I's Secret Agents (broadcast in the U.S. on PBS in 2018 as Queen Elizabeth's Secret Agents) deals in part with the Babington plot.

== See also ==
- Rising of the North
- Ridolfi Plot
- Throckmorton Plot
- History of cryptography
