= Gilbert Gifford =

English spy and Catholic priest (1560–1590)

- Born: c. November 1560; Staffordshire, England
- Died: November 1590; Paris, France
- Education: English College, Douai; English College, Rome; College at Rheims
- Employer: Sir Francis Walsingham
- Known for: Acting as a double agent in the Babington Plot and intercepting the correspondence of Mary, Queen of Scots
- Criminal status: Imprisoned by the Catholic League
- Parent: John Giffard

Gilbert Gifford (c. November 1560–November 1590) was a double agent who worked for Sir Francis Walsingham and played a role in the uncovering of the Babington Plot. Shortly before his death in Paris, he was ordained as a Catholic priest in Rheims. His true allegiances, whether to Queen Elizabeth I or to Mary, Queen of Scots, and the Catholic cause – are unclear.

== In Douai, Rome and Rheims ==
Born in Staffordshire in 1560, Gifford was the son of a recusant Catholic landowner and former Member of Parliament, John Giffard of Chillington Hall. In 1577, he entered Cardinal Allen's English College at Douai, hoping to become a missionary priest. Two years later, he transferred to the English College at Rome. He was expelled from there, but was offered a second chance by Allen, and in 1582, he returned to Allen's college, which was now based at Rheims. He left again, returned to England, and went back to France, and from there to Rome. In October 1583, he returned to Rheims, and Allen, despite some doubts, readmitted him to the college. Gifford was ordained as a deacon in 1585.

== Double agent ==
It was around this time that Gifford became friendly with John Savage, a student and former soldier who was involved in a plot to assassinate Queen Elizabeth and put Mary, Queen of Scots, on the throne. According to Savage's confession in English State Papers, Savage had agreed in the presence of Gilbert Gifford, William Gifford (Gilbert's cousin) and Christopher Hodgson (Gilbert's close friend) to carry out this assassination. In October 1585 Gifford left Rheims again and went to Paris, where he met Thomas Morgan, an agent of Mary, and Charles Paget, another conspirator in the plot to assassinate the Queen. In December he crossed over to the port of Rye on the southern coast of England, where he was arrested and brought to London for questioning by Sir Francis Walsingham, head of the Queen's security forces.

In the course of the interrogation, or beforehand, Gifford agreed to act as double agent. Walsingham gave him the code name No. 4. He used several aliases, such as Colerdin, Pietro, Cornelys and Nicolas Cornelius. He visited Mary, Queen of Scots, during her imprisonment at Chartley in Staffordshire. He quickly gained her trust and took the role of smuggling encrypted letters to and from her, concealing them in beer barrels. Some of the letters were in a cipher code formerly used by Michel de Castelnau. The letters were secretly handed to Walsingham and decoded, and led to the arrest and execution of Anthony Babington and the other conspirators, as well as to the execution of Queen Mary.

== Fateful flight to France ==
Knowing that the Babington Plot would fail, Gifford departed for France without Walsingham's permission. In a letter dated 2 August 1586, Walsingham wrote: "Sorry I am that Gilbert Gifford is absent. I marvel greatly how this humour of estranging himself cometh upon him." He was ordained as a priest in Rheims in March 1587. At least nominally a Catholic, Gifford opposed both the Jesuits and the proposed Spanish invasion.

In late 1587 in Paris, he was arrested in a brothel, being found in bed with a woman and a male servant of the Earl of Essex. Initially placed in the Bishop's prison, his captors considered sending him back to Walsingham. Eventually he was transferred to the Bastille to await trial. A record of his interrogation shows that he tried to implicate Morgan and Paget in double dealings. In August 1589 he was brought before the court and sentenced to twenty year's imprisonment for acting against the interests of the Catholic Church. At that time Paris was in the control of the Catholic League, which had risen against the French King. While in prison his health deteriorated. At the Battle of Ivry in March 1590 the army of the League was annihilated, and the King marched towards Paris, determined to starve the capital into submission. The siege lasted until August and caused a famine. Gifford died a few months later, in November 1590.

== Assessment ==
While Gifford is universally acknowledged as a double agent, his ultimate loyalties are often perceived to be in favour of Walsingham and Queen Elizabeth, rather than Mary, Queen of Scots. This supposition sits uneasily with the facts of his Catholicism, his flight from England when the Babington Plot was thwarted, and Walsingham's disapproval of his emigration. The English ambassador in Paris, Sir Edward Stafford went through Gifford's papers after his arrest in 1587 and concluded that: "He had showed himself to be the most notable double, treble villain that ever lived." One historian has suggested that in fact Gifford was working for the assassination of Elizabeth.
