= Thomas Phelippes =

British cryptographer

- Born: 1556
- Died: 1625 (aged 68–69)
- Education: Trinity College, Cambridge
- Occupations: Cryptographer, linguist, intelligence officer, decipherer
- Employer: Francis Walsingham
- Known for: Deciphering the correspondence of the Babington Plot; forging the postscript to Mary, Queen of Scots's intercepted letter to Anthony Babington

Thomas Phelippes (1556–1625), also known as Thomas Phillips, was a linguist, who was employed as a forger and intelligence gatherer. He served mainly under Sir Francis Walsingham, in the time of Elizabeth I, and most notably deciphered the coded letters of Babington Plot conspirators.

== Life and education ==
Little is known about Phelippes family background except that he was the son of a cloth merchant. Despite his humble origins, it is believed that he entered Trinity College, Cambridge, in 1569 and graduated with a Bachelor of Arts in 1574. Phelippes was a linguist who could speak French, Italian, Spanish, Latin and German. His education helped him to master cipher skills and be an excellent cryptographer of high reputation. Accordingly, he was employed by Sir Francis Walsingham, the principal secretary to Queen Elizabeth I.

Phelippes joined the embassy of Amias Paulet in Paris in 1578. Another codeworker in diplomatic circles at this times was John Somers (died 1585). The appearance of Phelippes in 1586 was described by Mary, Queen of Scots, as "a man of low stature, slender in every way, dark yellow-haired on the head and clear yellow bearded", with a pock-marked face and short-sighted. Later in life his eyesight weakened and he was helped in his work by his wife, Mary. He has been described as "an excellent linguist, and, above all, a person with a positive genius for deciphering letters."

== Babington Plot ==
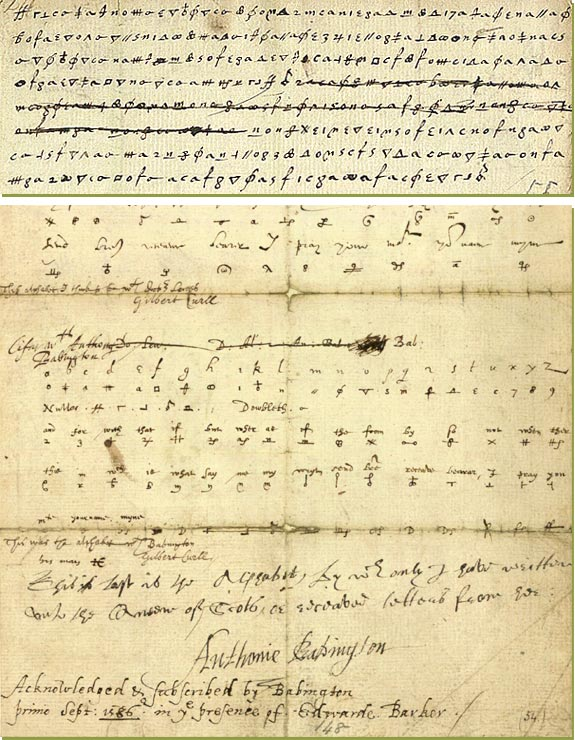
The original ciphertext sent by Anthony Babington to Mary, Queen of Scots, with Phelippes's key and postscript addition.

Phelippes is most remembered for his postscript to the "bloody letter" sent by Mary, Queen of Scots, to Anthony Babington regarding the Babington plot. When he sent Walsingham the letter proving Mary, Queen of Scots's complicity in the plot Phelippes had drawn a gallows on the envelope. According to historian Neville Williams, the notes were smuggled to Mary via empty barrels from a brewer in Burton upon Trent who supplied the house at Chartley Manor where she was being held prisoner in the custody of Sir Amias Paulet. Phelippes was kept busy with a backlog of correspondence requested by Her Majesty whose letters contained day to day matters as well as those of a more sensitive type. Walsingham had to wait a whole seven months before he got what he wanted. This postscript asked Babington for the names of the plotters involved in the planned assassination of Queen Elizabeth I, and hence Francis Walsingham was able to prove Mary's direct involvement in the plot, and have her executed.

Phelippes questioned Mary's secretaries and a servant Jérôme Pasquier in the Tower of London. In September 1586, Pasquier confessed to writing a letters in cipher for Mary. Pasquier recalled a letter for the French ambassador Michel de Castelnau, asking him to negotiate a pardon for Francis Throckmorton who was executed in 1584 for his part in the Throckmorton Plot.
