= Chidiock Tichborne =

English poet and conspirator against Elizabeth I

Chidiock Tichborne (after 24 August 1562 – 20 September 1586), erroneously referred to as Charles, was an English conspirator and poet.

== Life ==
Tichborne was born in Southampton sometime after 24 August 1562 to Roman Catholic parents, Peter Tichborne and his wife Elizabeth (née Middleton). His birth date has been given as circa 1558 in many sources, though unverified, and thus his age given as 28 at his execution. It is unlikely that he was born before his parents' marriage, so he could have been no more than 23 years old when he died.

Chidiock Tichborne descended from Sir Roger de Tichborne, who owned land at Tichborne, near Winchester, in the twelfth century. Chidiock's second cousin and contemporary was Sir Benjamin Tichborne who lived at Tichborne Park and was created a Baronet by King James I in 1621. In Chidiock's reported oration from the scaffold before his execution he allegedly stated: "I am descended from a house, from two hundred years before the Conquest, never stained till this my misfortune".

Chidiock's father Peter appears to have been the youngest son of Henry Tichborne (born circa 1474) and Anne Mervin (or Marvin) but the records are unclear. Peter was clerk of the Crowne at the trial of Sir Nicholas Throckmorton in 1554 and was an ardent Catholic supporter. Being the youngest son of a youngest son he was of little means and required to make his own way. He secured an education and the patronage of his distant kinsman, Lord Chidiock Paulet (1521–1574, son of the 1st Marquess of Winchester), after whom he named his son. In later life he spent many years imprisoned unable to pay recusancy fines. Chidiock's mother was Elizabeth Middleton, daughter of William Middleton (grandson of Sir Thomas Middleton of Belso) and Elizabeth Potter (daughter of John Potter of Westram). William had been servant to John Islip, Abbot of Westminster, and a banner bearer at Islip's funeral 1532, and later bought lands in Kent.

The name "Chidiock", pronounced ‘chidik’, as derived from his father's patron, Chidiock Paulet, originates from a Paulet ancestor, Sir John de Chideock, who owned land at Chideock, a village in Dorset. Chidiock Tichborne was never called Charles – this is an error that has grown from a misprint in the AQA GCSE English Literature syllabus which has included the Elegy in its early poetry section for several years. Unfortunately, this error persists in much of the educational literature supporting the syllabus.

At least two of Chidiock's sisters are recorded by name: Dorothy, first wife of Thomas Muttelbury of Jurdens, Somerset; and Mary, second wife of Sir William Kirkham of Blagdon in the parish of Paignton in Devon. At his execution Chidiock mentions his wife Agnes, one child, and his six sisters. In his letter to his wife, written the night before his execution he mentions his sisters – and also 'my little sister Babb'. Another sister is implied in a secret intelligence note to Francis Walsingham, dated 18 September 1586, in which the writer has had conference with "Jennings of Portsmouth" who reports that Mr Bruyn of Dorset and Mr Kyrkham of Devon are persons to be suspect as they had married Tychbourn's sisters.

== History ==
After the succession of Elizabeth I to the throne following the death of Mary I, Chidiock was allowed to practise Catholicism for part of his early life. However, in 1570 the Queen was excommunicated by the Pope for her own Protestantism and support of Protestant causes, most notably the Dutch Rebellion against Spain; in retaliation she ended her relative toleration of the Catholic Church. Catholicism was made illegal, and Roman Catholics were once more banned by law from practising their religion and Roman Catholic priests risked death for performing their functions.

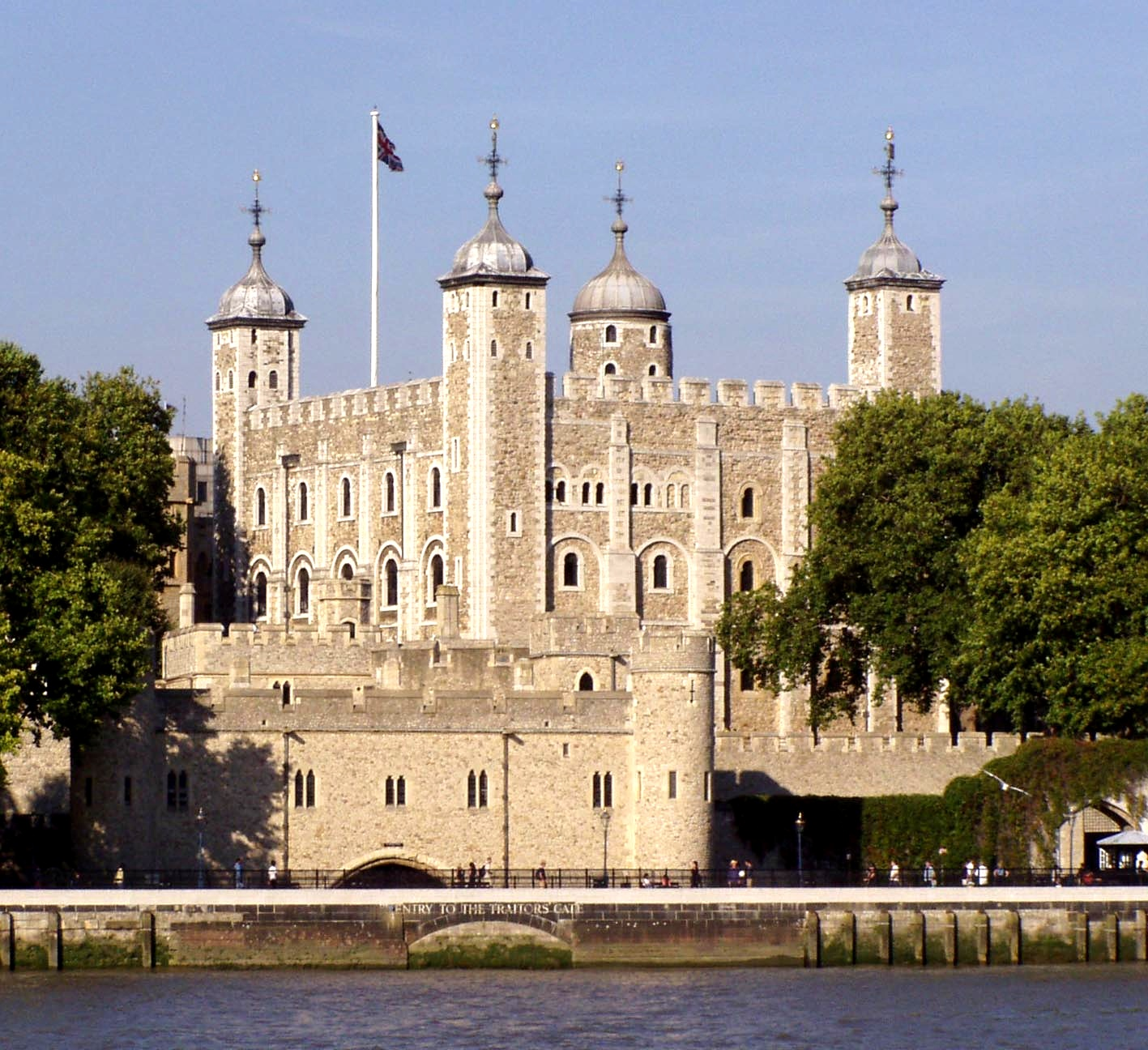
Tower of London, Traitor's Gate

In 1583, Tichborne and his father, Peter, were arrested and questioned concerning the use of "popish relics", religious objects Tichborne had brought back from a visit he had made abroad without informing the authorities of an intention to travel. Though released without charge, records suggest that this was not the last time they were to be questioned by the authorities over their religion. In June 1586 accusations of "popish practices" were laid against his family.

In June 1586, Tichborne agreed to take part in the Babington Plot to murder Queen Elizabeth and replace her with the Catholic Mary, Queen of Scots, who was next in line to the throne. The plot was foiled by Sir Francis Walsingham, Elizabeth's spymaster, using double agents, most notably Robert Poley who was later witness to the murder of Christopher Marlowe, and though most of the conspirators fled, Tichborne had an injured leg and was forced to remain in London. On 14 August he was arrested and he was later tried and sentenced to death in Westminster Hall.

While in custody in the Tower of London on 19 September (the eve of his execution), Tichborne wrote a letter to his wife. She is named as Agnes, even though the State Papers recording his interrogation clearly identify her as Jane Martyn of Athelhampton. But in Tudor times, Agnes was often used as a nickname or term of endearment for very devout women; and it was pronounced in a way that made it sound similar to Jane. So Agnes was most probably a private name that the young husband used for his wife.

The letter contained three stanzas of poetry that is his best known piece of work, Tichborne's Elegy, also known by its first line My Prime of Youth is but a Frost of Cares. The poem is a dark look at a life cut short and is a favourite of many scholars to this day. Two other poems are known by him, To His Friend and The Housedove.

On 20 September 1586, Tichborne was executed with Anthony Babington, John Ballard, and four other conspirators. They were eviscerated, hanged, drawn and quartered, the mandatory punishment for treason, in St Giles Field. However, when Elizabeth was informed that these gruesome executions were arousing sympathy for the condemned, she ordered that the remaining seven conspirators were to be hanged until 'quite dead' before being eviscerated.

== Tichborne's poetry ==
=== Elegy and others ===
==== Elegy ====
My prime of youth is but a frost of cares,
My feast of joy is but a dish of pain,
My crop of corn is but a field of tares,
And all my good is but vain hope of gain;
The day is past, and yet I saw no sun,
And now I live, and now my life is done.

My tale was heard and yet it was not told,
My fruit is fallen, and yet my leaves are green,
My youth is spent and yet I am not old,
I saw the world and yet I was not seen;
My thread is cut and yet it is not spun,
And now I live, and now my life is done.

I sought my death and found it in my womb,
I looked for life and saw it was a shade,
I trod the earth and knew it was my tomb,
And now I die, and now I was but made;
My glass is full, and now my glass is run,
And now I live, and now my life is done.

This is the first printed version from Verses of Prayse and Joye (1586). The original text differs slightly: along with other minor differences, the first line of the second verse reads "The spring is past, and yet it hath not sprung," and the third line reads "My youth is gone, and yet I am but young."

The last word in the third line, "tares," refers to a harmful "weed" that resembles corn when young, and is a reference to Matt. 13:24–30.

==== To His Friend (assumed to be Anthony Babington) ====
Good sorrow cease, false hope be gone, misfortune once farewell;
Come, solemn muse, the sad discourse of our adventures tell.
A friend I had whose special heart made mine affections his;
We ruled tides and streams ourselves, no want was in our bliss.
Six years we sailed, sea-room enough, by many happy lands,
Till at the length, a stream us took and cast us on the sands.
There lodged we were in a gulf of woe, despairing what to do,
Till at the length, from shore unknown, a Pilot to us drew,
Whose help did sound our grounded ship from out Caribda's mouth,
But unadvised, on Scylla drives; the wind which from the South
Did blustering blow the fatal blast of our unhappy fall,
Where driving, leaves my friend and I to fortune ever thrall;
Where we be worse beset with sands and rocks on every side,
Where we be quite bereft of aid, of men, of winds, of tide.
Where vain it is to hail for help so far from any shore,
So far from Pilot's course; despair shall we, therefore?
No! God from out his heap of helps on us will some bestow,
And send such mighty surge of seas, or else such blasts to blow
As shall remove our grounded ship far from this dangerous place,
And we shall joy each others' chance through God's almighty grace,
And keep ourselves on land secure, our sail on safer seas.
Sweet friend, till then content thy self, and pray for our release.

==== The Housedove ====
A silly housedove happed to fall
amongst a flock of crows,
Which fed and filled her harmless craw
amongst her fatal foes.
The crafty fowler drew his net –
all his that he could catch –
The crows lament their hellish chance,
the dove repents her match.
But too, too late! it was her chance
the fowler did her spy,
And so did take her for a crow –
which thing caused her to die.

The only known manuscript versions of "To His Friend" and The Housedove" are from Edinburgh Library MS Laing, II, 69/24. However, twenty-eight different manuscript versions of the "Elegy" (or "Lament") are known and there are many variations of the text.

=== Comment ===
Tichborne's authorship of the Elegy has been disputed, with attributions to others including Sir Walter Raleigh. However it was printed soon after the Babington plot in a volume called Verses of Praise and Joy in 1586, published by John Wolfe of London to celebrate the Queen's survival and to attack the plotters. In the same volume an answer poem entitled "Hendecasyllabon T. K. in Cygneam Cantionem Chideochi Tychborne" ("T. K.'s Hendecasyllabon Against Chidiock Tichborne's Swan Song") is most likely by the poet and dramatist Thomas Kyd, author of The Spanish Tragedy.

==== Hendecasyllabon T. K. in Cygneam Cantionem Chideochi Tychborne ====
Thy prime of youth is frozen with thy faults,
Thy feast of joy is finisht with thy fall;
Thy crop of corn is tares availing naughts,
Thy good God knows thy hope, thy hap and all.
Short were thy days, and shadowed was thy sun,
T'obscure thy light unluckily begun.

Time trieth truth, and truth hath treason tripped;
Thy faith bare fruit as thou hadst faithless been:
Thy ill spent youth thine after years hath nipt;
And God that saw thee hath preserved our Queen.
Her thread still holds, thine perished though unspun,
And she shall live when traitors lives are done.

Thou soughtst thy death, and found it in desert,
Thou look'dst for life, yet lewdly forc'd it fade:
Thou trodst the earth, and now on earth thou art,
As men may wish thou never hadst been made.
Thy glory, and thy glass are timeless run;
And this, O Tychborne, hath thy treason done.

=== Critical appreciation ===
==== Elegy ====
Tichborne's "Elegy" (his rhyming, final soliloquy poem), uses two favourite Renaissance figures of speech – antithesis and paradox – to crystallise the tragedy of the poet's situation. Antithesis means setting opposites against each other: prime of youth / frost of cares (from the first line). This is typical of Renaissance poetry, as for example in Wyatt's "I find no peace, and all my war is done", with the lover freezing/burning. It also appears in the poem by Elizabeth I "I grieve and dare not show my discontent", e.g., "I am and not, I freeze and yet am burned." A paradox is a statement which seems self-contradictory, yet is true, e.g., "My tale is heard, and yet it was not told", or "My glass is full, and now my glass is run." Often a Renaissance poem will begin with antithesis to establish circumstances and reveal its themes through paradox.

The "Elegy" is remarkable for being written almost entirely in monosyllables: Every word in the poem is of one syllable, with ten words in each line, monostich style), with the possible exception of the word "fallen". However, in early editions it was written as "fall'n" which is monosyllabic.

The "Elegy" has inspired many "homages" and "answers" including those by Jonathon Robin at allpoetry.com; a rap version by David A More at www.marlovian.com; After Reading Tichborne's Elegy by Dick Allen (2003) and Tichborne's Lexicon by Nick Montfort.

The "Elegy" has also been set to music many times from the Elizabethan era to the present day by, among others, Michael East, Richard Alison (fl. 1580–1610, in An Hour's Recreation in musicke, 1606), John Mundy (1592) and Charles-François Gounod (1873) and more recently Norman Dello Joio (1949) and Jim Clark (see Tichborne's Elegy Poem Animation) and Taylor Momsen.

==== The Housedove ====
"The Housedove" exploits a popular image from the period: Tichborne sees himself as an innocent dove caught among his fellow conspirators, (see Shakespeare's Romeo and Juliet 1.5.48). The "crafty fowler" is probably Sir Francis Walsingham, the spymaster who manipulated the Babington plot.

== Sources ==
- Richard S. M. Hirsch (1986), 'The Works of Chidiock Tichborne', English Literary Renaissance, Vol. 16 No. 2, pp. 303–318 and (1987) Vol 17 pp. 276–277
- Isaac D'Israeli (c. 1859) (1st collected edition 1881) Curiosities of Literature, Vol. II, pp. 171–178
- Teresa McLean (1982) 'The Recusant Legend: Chideock Tichborne', History Today, Vol. 32, Issue 5, May 1982, pp. 11–14
- Katharine Tynan (Hinkson) (1892) 'A Conspirator under Queen Elizabeth', The Ave Maria, Vol. XXXV, Notre Dame, Indiana, 24 September 1892, No. 13
