= John Ballard (Jesuit) =

English priest and conspirator against Elizabeth I

- Died: September 20, 1586
- Cause of death: Hanged, drawn and quartered
- Occupation: Secular Priest
- Known for: Conspiring against Elizabeth I in the Babington Plot
- Criminal charges: Treason

John Ballard (died 20 September 1586) was a Secular English priest executed for being involved in an attempt to assassinate Queen Elizabeth I of England in the Babington Plot.

== Biography ==
John Ballard was the son of William Ballard of Wratting, Suffolk. Ballard enrolled at St Catharine's College, Cambridge in 1569, but subsequently migrated to Caius College, Cambridge, and on the 29 November 1579 went on to study at the English College at Rheims. He was ordained as a secular priest at Châlons on 4 March 1581, and was sent back to England on 29 March as a Catholic missionary. Being a Catholic missionary in Protestant England, he had a price on his head. In order to conceal his identity, he used an alias of a swashbuckling, courtly soldier named Captain Fortescue and was once described as wearing 'a fine cape laced with gold, a cut satin doublet and silver buttons on his hat'. Being a tall, dark-complexioned man, he was referred to by those who were unaware of his true identity as 'Black Foskew'.

=== The Babington Plot ===
In the Babington Plot, Ballard instigated Anthony Babington, Chidiock Tichborne and others to assassinate the Queen as a prelude to a full-blown invasion of England by Spanish-led Catholic forces. However, the plot had been discovered and nurtured by Queen Elizabeth's spymaster Francis Walsingham from the start. Indeed, Ballard's inseparable companion and fixer, Barnard Maude, who travelled everywhere with him, was a government spy.

The plot was manipulated by Walsingham in order to bring about his primary objective: the downfall of Mary, Queen of Scots. When Mary gave her consent to the plot by replying to a letter sent to her by Babington, her days were numbered. With this vital piece of evidence in his possession, Walsingham had Ballard and the other conspirators arrested. Ballard was tortured.

=== Death ===
The Babington conspirators faced trial at Westminster Hall on the 13 and 14 September 1586. Found guilty of treason and conspiracy against the Crown, 14 men were sentenced to execution by hanging, drawing and quartering. The executions took place in two batches, with Ballard and other primary conspirators executed on the first day, 20 September, followed by others on the 21st. The manner of their deaths was so bloody and horrific that it deeply shocked those who were present at the spectacle. When Elizabeth was told of the suffering the men had endured on the scaffold, and its effect on the many witnesses, she is said to have ordered that the remaining seven conspirators be left hanging until they were 'quite dead' before being cut down and butchered.

== In popular culture ==
- Ballard was played by Tom Fleming in the film Mary, Queen of Scots (1971).
- In the 1972 BBC TV-miniseries Elizabeth R episode "Horrible Conspiracies," Ballard was portrayed by David Garfield.
- In the 1998 film Elizabeth he is portrayed by Daniel Craig, where he is inaccurately depicted as being executed for participating in the Ridolfi plot; due to this, a fictional character named Robert Reston (Rhys Ifans) was created in the 2007 sequel, Elizabeth: The Golden Age, to portray Ballard's actions in the Babington plot.
