= Anthony Babington =

English nobleman convicted of plotting the assassination of Elizabeth I of England

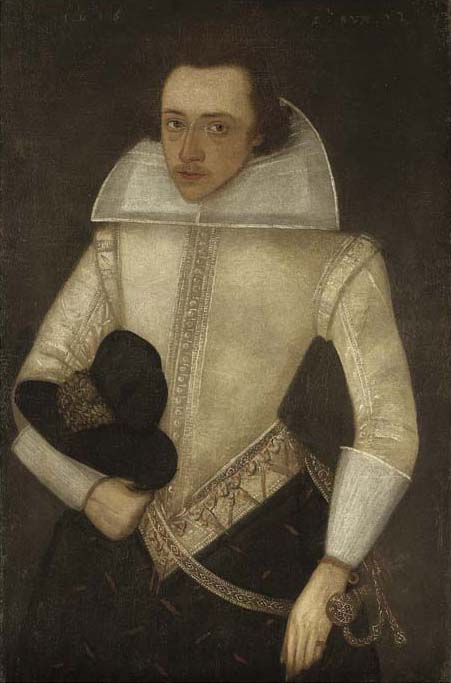
- Portrait of a young gentleman said to be Anthony Babington
- Born: 24 October 1561; Dethick Manor, Dethick, Derbyshire, England
- Died: 20 September 1586 (aged 24); St Giles Field, Holborn, London, England
- Resting place: Body quartered and displayed at various locations in England
- Occupations: Gentleman, courtier, conspirator
- Known for: Mastermind of the Babington Plot to assassinate Elizabeth I and place Mary, Queen of Scots, on the English throne.
- Criminal charge: High treason
- Criminal penalty: Death
- Criminal status: Executed by hanging, drawing and quartering

Anthony Babington (24 October 1561 – 20 September 1586) was an English gentleman convicted of plotting the assassination of Elizabeth I of England and conspiring with the imprisoned Mary, Queen of Scots, for which he was hanged, drawn and quartered. The "Babington Plot" and Mary's involvement in it were the basis of the treason charges against her which led to her execution. He was a member of the Babington family.

== Biography ==
Born into a gentry family to Sir Henry Babington and Mary Darcy, granddaughter of Thomas Darcy, 1st Baron Darcy de Darcy, at Dethick Manor in Dethick, Derbyshire, England, he was their third child. His father died in 1571 when Anthony was nine years old, and his mother married Henry Foljambe. Anthony was under the guardianship of his mother, her second husband, Henry Foljambe, and Philip Draycot of Paynsley Hall, Cresswell, Staffordshire, his future father-in-law. While publicly Protestant, the family remained Catholic.

Babington was employed as a page boy in the Earl of Shrewsbury's household. The Earl was at this time the gaoler of Mary, Queen of Scots and it is likely that it was during this time that Babington became a supporter of Mary's cause to ascend the throne of England. In 1579, he was married to Margery Draycot. He was never knighted, judging by the fact that he is not listed in The Knights of England.

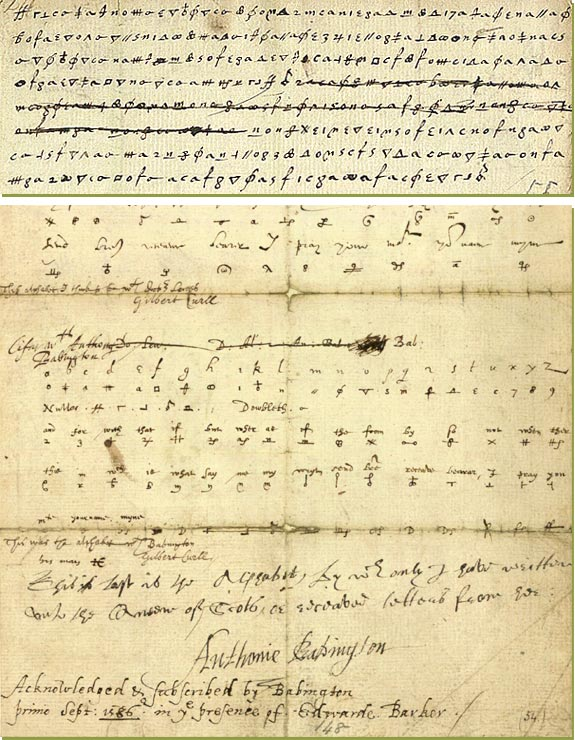
Thomas Phelippes' forged cipher postscript to Mary, Queen of Scots' letter to Anthony Babington

In about 1580, while travelling on the continent, he had met the arch-conspirator Thomas Morgan, who persuaded him to courier letters to Mary while she was still being held by his former master, the Earl of Shrewsbury. He also assisted the movement of priests in the Catholic Midlands, but by 1586, with Mary removed to the harsher regime of Tutbury and the consequent closing down of communications with her, Babington's role as a courier came to an end. Twice in early 1586 he received letters from France, destined for Mary, but in each case he declined to 'deal further in those affairs'. Around this time he was reportedly considering leaving England permanently and was trying to secure a passport along with his Welsh friend, Thomas Salisbury. He obtained an introduction to Robert Poley, a man with good political contacts, with a view to securing a 'licence' to go to France. Poley, unknown to Babington, was an agent for Francis Walsingham, the Secretary of State, and was under orders to infiltrate known Catholic circles. He probably intentionally failed to obtain a passport for Babington, and instead persuaded him that he, Poley, was a Catholic sympathiser and could be trusted. It was Babington's misplaced trust of, and possibly even love for, Poley that was a large contributory factor in his eventual downfall.

During Elizabeth's reign her court was particularly concerned about the prospect of Mary Stuart coming to the throne. It was a time of great religious tension. The St. Bartholomew's Day Massacre served to increase the realisation of the outcome a return to Roman Catholicism might present. The Queen's security forces, led by Sir Francis Walsingham with its ruthless and cunning spies like Poley were more than effective at their job. During one of Walsingham's investigations, a suspected subversive named Gilbert Gifford was arrested and interrogated. To avoid punishment, Gifford agreed to act as a double agent. He made contact with the French Embassy in London and arranged the smuggling of letters from Mary Stuart to her followers. This was to be achieved through the use of beer barrels. Gifford ensured that Walsingham was given access to these communications, which revealed Mary's requests to the French and Spanish that they intervene on her behalf.

On 6 July 1586, Babington wrote to Mary Stuart, telling her that he and a group of friends were planning to assassinate Elizabeth, whom she (the Queen of Scots) would succeed. Babington's (and Mary Stuart's) defenders claim that in the sixteenth century it was held that the killing of "tyrants" was morally acceptable. Babington decided to write to Mary to seek her authorisation, which he believed she could provide as the legitimate claimant to the throne. (It was believed by Catholics that Elizabeth's claim to the throne was void due to her being the daughter of Anne Boleyn whose marriage to Henry VIII they considered illegal due to Henry VIII's divorce from his first wife, Catherine of Aragon.)

Mary replied to Babington, in which she stressed the necessity of foreign aid if the rescue attempt was to succeed. However, she left the matter of the assassination to Babington's conscience.

In the meantime, Babington's growing involvement with the plot was being reported to Walsingham, by Poley, who was by this time much in Babington's confidence, despite having been caught by him copying some of Mary's letters. When Walsingham and his officials had gathered sufficient evidence, Babington and his crew were rounded up. Babington was in the Tower of London by 3 September when Burghley ordered his goods and papers at Dethick to be seized. The house was almost empty except for his two sisters, Madeleine and Ellen, and his two-year-old daughter. His wife had fled.

== Death ==
Babington (aged 24) and his thirteen conspirators were convicted of high treason and sentenced to be hanged, drawn and quartered.

His offer to Elizabeth of £1,000 for his pardon was rejected, and the execution of the first seven (including Babington, John Ballard, and Chidiock Tichborne) took place on the 20th. The condemned men, kept in the Tower of London, were marched from their cells, strapped to sledges and pulled by horses through the streets of London. On reaching a specially erected scaffold in St. Giles' Field, near Holborn, they were hanged, drawn and quartered. After this, the executioner distributed the parts of their bodies to prominent locations around the city to warn all of the consequences of disloyalty to the monarch.

Babington's final letter to his friend and betrayer, Poley ("farewell sweet Robyn...") is one of the more strikingly poignant documents in the case.

== Popular culture ==
A Traveller in Time by Alison Uttley is set at Thackers, the fictional name for the Babington Manor House, actually at Dethick, in Derbyshire. The narrator, Penelope Taberner, witnesses young Anthony Babington's growing involvement with Mary, Queen of Scots, as Penelope finds herself passing between her world of the 1940s and the year 1582.

Anthony Babington is featured as a side character and friend of the protagonist in the 1912 novel Come Rack! Come Rope! by Robert Hugh Benson. The reader is given an outside view to the development of the Babington Plot through Anthony’s repeated meetings with the central characters.

In 2008, BBC Radio 4 broadcast an Afternoon Play by Michael Butt entitled The Babington Plot, directed by Sasha Yevtushenko with Stephen Greif as "The Presenter", done in documentary-style and told from the perspectives of some of the conspirators – some genuine, some government spies that had infiltrated the group - and several people who were in various ways involved in the events. Babington is portrayed as possibly homosexual and having an emotional relationship first with Thomas Salisbury (played by Samuel Barnett) and then Robert Poley (played by Burn Gorman).

== Actors who played Babington ==
- David Collings played Babington in the 1971 BBC miniseries Elizabeth R.
- Charles Rogers played Babington in the 1978 BBC miniseries adaptation of Alison Uttley's A Traveller in Time.
- Geoffrey Streatfeild played Babington in the HBO miniseries, Elizabeth I, which starred Helen Mirren.
- Eddie Redmayne played Babington in the 2007 film Elizabeth: The Golden Age.
- Nicholas Agnew played Babington in the 2016 BBC documentary Bloody Queens: Elizabeth and Mary.

== Ancestry ==
Ancestors of Anthony Babington

8. Sir Anthony Babington of Dethick
4. Thomas Babington Esq of Dethick
9. Elizabeth Ormond
2. Sir Henry Babington of Dethick
10. Sir Henry Sacheverell
5. Katherine Sacheverell
11. Isabel Montgomery
1. Anthony Babington
12. Thomas Darcy, 1st Baron Darcy de Darcy
6. George Darcy, 1st Baron Darcy of Aston
13. Dousabella Tempest
3. Mary Darcy
14. John Melton of Ashton
7. Dorothy Melton
15. Catherine Hastings

== Styles ==
- Sir Anthony Babington (?–1586)
- Anthony Babington (1586)
