= Edmund Ashfield (Catholic agent) =

English knight

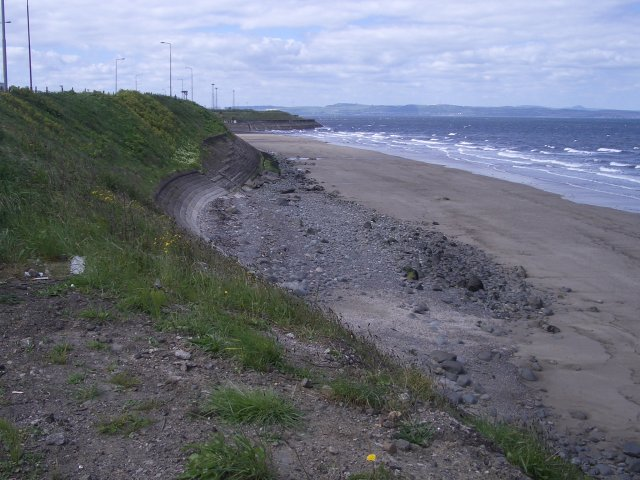
Sands at Seafield near Leith, where Edmund Ashfield was abducted in 1599

Edmund Ashfield (1576 – ca. 1620) was an English Catholic from Tattenhoe in Buckinghamshire. In 1599 he travelled to Edinburgh to meet James VI of Scotland. An English diplomat organised his kidnap and rendition in the belief that Ashfield was an agent of James VI and working to further his succession to the English throne.

== Background ==
Ashfield was a grandson of Christopher Ashfield of Chesham, who was a brother of Sir Edmund Ashfield (1480–1558).

He was educated at St Mary Hall, Oxford. He married Clara Hoord or Whorde in 1588. An aunt or cousin Cecily Ashfield was married to the Lord Chancellor Sir John Fortescue of Salden. Edmund's uncle Thomas Ashfield was a bailiff for the Earl of Oxford in 1571, and Edmund was Thomas's heir in 1609.

In 1606, Ashfield was involved in the rebuilding of Ashridge Priory for Sir Thomas Egerton. Ashfield was a friend of the writing-master John Davies of Hereford. In 1612, Henry Peacham dedicated his Graphice, or the Auncient Arte of Drawing and Limning to Ashfield, by then Deputy-Lieutenant of Buckinghamshire.

== Mission to Scotland ==
Edmund Ashfield wrote to James VI offering the advice that he ought to publish books setting forth his claim to the succession to Elizabeth I of England, and showing how he could gain support and rule. This approach was in response to the Jesuit position on the succession, set out in the pseudonymous succession tract by "R. Doleman". In 1599 he obtained a pass to enter Scotland from Peregrine Bertie, Baron Willoughby, Governor of Berwick upon Tweed and was helped in Scotland by Robert Ker of Cessford.

Ashfield spoke to James VI twice, in Edinburgh and during the King's hunting at Colinton. The royal hunt could be watched from the tower of Colinton Castle and James VI would dine there as a guest of the Foulis family. An agent of the Earl of Essex, Thomas Weynman, later wrote that Ashfield had discussed the possibility of James becoming King of England over dinner with some noblemen. The Earl of Cassilis joked: "Truly the Englishmen are good husbandmen, and have so well manured their grounds that we shall find a goodly and pleasant dwelling there when we come." Weynman thought that Ashfield's activities would turn James against the Earl of Essex.

Ashfield addressed a paper to James VI in 1599. He outlines the basis of support in England for James VI as the future king of England. He thought Catholics in England and English Catholic exiles would join his cause if he would make some indication of future toleration. He considered the possibility that Elizabeth I might allow Arbella Stuart to marry an English husband, and thus "assisted by some domestical match", she might become queen and continue the "sweet pleasing government" of England by a female ruler.

=== On the beach ===
When the English diplomats William Bowes and Willoughby discovered Ashfield's plans they organised a kidnap. John Guevara, the Deputy Warden of the East Marches and Willoughby's cousin, and three assistants were sent to Edinburgh. Willoughby later attributed the plan to his servant Waterhouse. Willoughby also had an armed ship in the Firth of Forth near the Isle of May.

They met Ashfield on the sands at Leith where he was riding with his Scottish friends and, it was alleged, gave him drugged wine, described as if "some opium had been given him with his sugar in his wine, which so bedulled his senses as he wist not what he did for the time".

Ashfield was driven away to Berwick in the English ambassador's coach while thinking he was getting a lift back to Edinburgh. Guevara's team were armed only with the rapiers and daggers that they normally carried. Willoughby had also organised a ship to lie off Prestonpans to give support if necessary. Ashfield's papers too were seized in Edinburgh and taken to Berwick. Willoughby wrote to Robert Cecil explaining his actions on 13 June 1599, and refused to return Ashfield to Scotland.

=== Diplomats expelled ===
James VI was unsurprisingly indignant at this activity and wrote to Willoughby on 14 June 1599 demanding Ashfield's return or an explanation for "the taking away violentlie out of the hart of our country and in sight of our chief palais and eyes of our counsale, ane Inglis gentilman." However, Willoughby reported that the Protestant clergy of Edinburgh were pleased with the taking of an enemy of religion.

William Bowes was forced into virtual house-arrest, and reportedly imprisoned at Edinburgh Castle. He was recalled and left Scotland shortly afterwards. Another English diplomat, George Nicolson, was not involved but felt he was endangered. Ashfield meanwhile was kept prisoner at the Tower of London with two Yeomen of the Guard as his warders.

James VI sent James Sempill, a son of his mother's companion Mary Livingston, as ambassador to London with instructions to complain about Ashfield's arrest. A council convened at Nonsuch Palace on 26 August 1599 minuted various reasons why the complaint was groundless, including a statement from Ashfield that he was a willing passenger in Willoughby's coach. Rowland Whyte heard the ambassador was unsuccessful in November 1599 and Ashfield was thought in England to "be a very lewd fellow".

Jonas Waterhouse petitioned for a reward for capturing Ashfield in Scotland. James VI wrote to Elizabeth on 30 April 1601 mentioning Ashfield and the unfortunate consequences of his visit to Scotland.

Ashfield was returned to favour in England when James became King. He was knighted at the Tower of London on 14 March 1604, given the lease of Whaddon Priory, and in April 1604 admitted as one of his Majesty's pensioners in ordinary.

Ashfield's abduction was recorded as a "heist" in a near-contemporary Scottish chronicle. The continuation of the Historie of King James the Sext follows the account in English letters by describing Ashfield as favoured by James VI;

Sir William Bowes, ambassador for hir majestie, used a slight (deceitful) stratageme by exposing sum of his craftie gentilmen to beare cumpanie with an Inglish gentilman of account whom the king favorit for certen secret occasionis betuix them, and heistit the man a cosh (on a coach), maid haistie depesh (dispatch) of him touart Ingland, for the whilk his majestie was exceiding angrie; and therfore causit the lodging of the said ambassador to be ombeset at all partis (surrounded) least he sould escape. Bot that mater was sone pacefeit.

== Poem ==
Intelligence on Ashfield was provided by Thomas Wayneman, a servant of Willoughby, who brought Ashfield to London. After the Union of Crowns, when James VI had become King of England, poet and calligrapher John Davies of Hereford wrote an epigram on the subject of Ashfield's journey to Scotland and rendition to the Tower of London:

You once entreated me to walke with you
From Hereford but unto Edenbrough:
Because (said you) we live heere in the hams
Of this scalld worlde, where neither Epigrams
Nor Satyrs can preserve it from the itch
Of scratching, common to the scraping-ritch
You went, I staid : but wished afterward
I had gone with you: yet, when that I hearde
A Wayne-man brought you backe, and that your Inne
Was but the Towre (a lodging straight and thinne)
I joy’d I went not : But fowre yeares expir'd,
And that all things fell out as you desir'd
I wisht againe I had bene in your place:
So, joy'd and griev'd as Fortune chang'd your case
But, sith your case is now too bigg for mee,
(You be'ng growne fatt, I leane in low'st degree,)
Let me rest in your heart, and then my case
I better hold than your old resting place.

Thomas Wayneman, also known as "Wenman", wrote to the Earl of Essex about the arrest of Ashfield and Scottish affairs. He claimed to have discovered Ashfield's mission. Wayneman thought that Ashfield had tried to present the Earl of Essex as an obstacle to James VI gaining the English throne. James supported a Catholic faction and the English aristocrat Francis Dacre. However, James seems to have counted the Earl of Essex as an ally.
