= William Fleetwood (judge) =

Member of the Parliament of England

William Fleetwood (1535? – 1594) was an English lawyer and politician. He was Member of Parliament for Marlborough in 1558, Lancaster in 1559 and 1567, St Mawes in 1571, and for the City of London several times between 1572 and 1592, but his most significant position was as Recorder of London from 1571 to 1591. A lawyer of the Middle Temple, he was a Queen's Serjeant in 1592.

== Early life ==
Fleetwood was born about 1535, the (possibly illegitimate) son of Robert Fleetwood, in turn the third son of William Fleetwood of Heskin in Lancashire. He was educated at Brasenose College, Oxford, which he left without a degree, and the Middle Temple, from where he was called to the bar. He became a freeman by patrimony of the -Worshipful Company of Merchant Taylors of the City of London on 21 June 1557; autumn reader of his inn on 21 May 1563; steward of the company's manor of Rushbrook in 1564, and counsel in their suit against the Clothworkers in 1565.

== Career ==
In 1558, Fleetwood was elected to the House of Commons as one of the members for Marlborough, thus sitting in the last of Queen Mary's parliaments, and later was a member for Lancaster in the first two parliaments of Elizabeth's reign (1559 and 1563). In 1559 he was one of the commissioners to visit the dioceses of Oxford, Lincoln, Peterborough, Coventry, and Lichfield, and in 1568 he became "double reader in Lent" to the Middle Temple.

By the Earl of Leicester's influence, on 26 April 1571 Fleetwood was appointed as Recorder of London, an important position which he held for twenty years, and in the same year was made a commissioner to inquire into the customs, and elected as MP for St Mawes. On 8 May 1572 he was returned to Parliament for the City of London. As Recorder of London he was famous for rigorously and successfully enforcing the laws against vagrants, mass-priests, and other papists.

In 1576 Fleetwood was committed to the Fleet prison for a short time for breaking into the Portuguese ambassador's chapel under colour of the law against popish recusants. His own account of his action, dated 9 Nov, is printed in John Strype's Annals.

In 1580, he was made a Serjeant-at-law, and in 1583 a commissioner for the reformation of abuses in printing. In the same year he drafted a scheme for housing the poor and preventing the plague in London by maintaining open spaces. On 27 April 1586 he was promised, but did not receive, the post of Baron of the Exchequer. He was elected again as a member of parliament for London in 1584, 1586, and 1588. In 1588 he reported, with the solicitor-general, as to proceedings to be taken against the Jesuits, and in 1589 on the right of sanctuary for criminals attaching to St. Paul's churchyard. In 1591 the common council voted him a pension of 100 pounds, whereupon he resigned his office of Recorder.

He was made Queen's Serjeant in 1592 and died at his house in Noble Street, Aldersgate, on 28 February 1593/4. He had formerly lived at Bacon House, Foster Lane, and at his death owned an estate at Great Missenden, Buckinghamshire, where he was buried.

== Private life ==
Fleetwood was a hard-working judge, and was disappointed at not receiving higher preferment. His connection with Leicester was insisted on by Leicester's enemies, and he is called "Leicester's mad Recorder" in Leicester's Commonwealth, but he was at the same time assiduous in cultivating Lord Burghley's favour. He was noted for wit, and his eloquence is eulogised by Thomas Newton in his Encomia, 1589.

He married Mariana, daughter of John Barley of Kingsey, Buckinghamshire, by whom he left a family of six sons and two daughters. His elder son, Sir William, succeeded to Missenden, and a younger son, Sir Thomas, of the Middle Temple, was attorney to Henry Frederick, Prince of Wales. One daughter (Cordelia) married Sir David Foulis, 1st Baronet, and the other (Elizabeth) Sir Thomas Chaloner.

== Printed works ==
Fleetwood's works are:

- An Oration made at Guildhall before the Mayor, concerning the late attempts of the Queen's Maiesties evil seditious subjects, 15 October 1571.
- Annalium tam Regum Edwardi V, Ric. III, et Hen. VII quam Hen. VIII, titulorum ordine alphabetico digestorum Elenchus, 1579, 1597.
- A Table to the Reports of Edmund Plowden (in French), 1578, 1579, 1599.
- The Office of a Justice of the Peace, 1658 (posthumous). In the preface, Fleetwood mentions a work of his, De Pace Ecclesiæ, not otherwise known.
- Verses before Sir Thomas Chaloner's De Republica Anglorum instauranda, 1579, and William Lambarde's Perambulation of Kent, 1576.

== Manuscripts ==
Many of Fleetwood's works remained in manuscript. Among them are Observacons sur Littleton (Harley MS 5225), besides four volumes of reports and law commonplaces (Harley MSS 5153–5156). Wood saw in manuscript Observations upon the Eyre of Pickering, and on Lambarde's Archeion.

Also left was Itinerarium ad Windsor, an unpublished work relating to the succession to Elizabeth I of England. Fleetwood had read the 1563 succession tract of John Hales. In this work he describes a (fictional) dialogue, in which he takes part with the Earl of Leicester and Baron Buckhurst. It touches on the doctrine of the King's Two Bodies as a way for Queen Elizabeth to legitimate her rule. In this final section of the work, the characters use verbatim (though in English) sections from the Reports of Edmund Plowden, to support the concept of queen regnant.
