= Sir David Foulis, 1st Baronet =

Scottish diplomat and politician

Sir David Foulis (died 1642) was a Scottish diplomat and politician.

== Life ==
Foulis was the third son of James Foulis of Colinton, by Agnes Heriot of Lumphoy, and great-grandson of Sir James Foulis of Colinton (d. 1549). His brothers were James Foulis of Colinton, and George Foulis (goldsmith and Master of the Mint (1569–1633)). His sister, Margaret, married lawyer and king's advocate Thomas Hamilton in 1597. Goldsmith Thomas Foulis was his uncle.

The family lived in Old Colinton House (later called Woodhall). Agnes Heriot, his mother, died on 8 August 1593 and is buried in the floor of Colinton Parish Church. Agnes appears to have been a sister or relative of George Heriot a notable Edinburgh merchant and goldsmith.

From 1594 onward, David Foulis was actively engaged in politics, and many of his letters are published and calendared in the Calendar of Scottish State Papers edited by John Duncan Mackie in 1969.

=== Essex and a diamond ring ===
Foulis was often in London and concerned with the receipt of an annuity or subsidy from Queen Elizabeth. He made friends with Anthony Bacon, a client of the Earl of Essex. In his letters, he referred to Essex as "Plato."

On 1 July 1594, he received £4,000 sterling for James VI. His uncle, the goldsmith and royal financier Thomas Foulis, made an account of the spending of this money for James VI, along with the tax money on his gold mines, money coined at the royal mint by Thomas Acheson, and £680 Scots received from the Secretary, Richard Cockburn of Clerkington in December 1594, with another £3,000 received by David Foulis at London in August 1595. Foulis himself received £1000 (Scots) from the subsidy for the expenses of this journey to London.

Foulis wrote to Anthony Bacon about the arrival in July and August 1594 of the ambassadors for the baptism of Prince Henry. Foulis (and the English ambassador Robert Bowes) heard of discussions that Anna of Denmark's sister Augusta might marry Count Maurice.

Foulis was a success at both courts, and James VI wrote to Elizabeth I on 26 July 1594 thanking her for "the kind and loving speeches it pleased you to use to my servant Foulis, the bearer of my last [letter]; for surely I cannot yet weary to hear him oft repeat your kind and loving speeches of me".

After the baptism at Stirling Castle, Foulis went to the north of Scotland with James VI. He wrote to Essex that the king had pawned his jewels for £2,000 sterling to fund this military mission, and declared that no house where the Catholic Mass has been said would remain standing. In a letter to Anthony Bacon, Foulis reported on demolition works at Huntly Castle while the Countess of Huntly looked on, and destruction at Slains.

On 8 July 1595, at Falkland Palace James VI gave him a diamond ring worth 200 crowns to give to someone in London, probably the Earl of Essex. His mission was to ask for money for James VI and financial assistance for his brother, Thomas Foulis. He was also to discuss the affairs of the west border and the border warden Walter Scott of Buccleuch, and congratulate the Queen on the Earl of Essex.

On his return to Scotland, on 27 September at Falkland, Foulis wrote a letter in French to the Earl of Essex, assuring him that James VI had a good opinion of Elizabeth. He had not given the earl's letter to the Chancellor, John Maitland of Thirlestane, who was ill. Foulis thought the Chancellor would recover, and form a firm alliance with the Earl of Mar and abandon the cause of William Ker of Cessford and Buccleuch, who had lost the support of Anne of Denmark. She was now in accord with her husband, who was dissatisfied with the amount of English money Foulis had received in London (only £2,000). Unfortunately for Foulis's scheme, Maitland did not recover to cement these alliances, but died at Thirlestane Castle on 3 October.

=== Kinmont Willie ===
Foulis was sent to London in March 1596 with the king's letters and news of foreign Catholics in Scotland. He was given 100 crowns and a promise of a monthly allowance of 60 crowns. James VI received an anonymous letter criticising Foulis's abilities, and suggesting William Cecil and the Earl of Essex were working together against the king's interest. This year, Elizabeth delayed giving money to Foulis for James VI because of the offence caused by Walter Scott of Buccleuch who had rescued Kinmont Willie from Carlisle Castle. On 8 July 1596 Walter Stewart of Blantyre wrote to Foulis that he should return if Elizabeth's attitude did not improve.

Foulis wrote to James VI on 20 July that his discussion were going well with the queen, and he used a figure of speech drawn from tennis, "I praise God the ball is yet aloft and I hope shalbe kept at the stotte." An exchange of letters with Robert Cecil on the followings days suggests his mission was stalled, as he had said that James would not write to Elizabeth.

At the end of July, James VI wrote an order for Foulis to reimburse an English diplomat George Nicolson £300 Sterling for a sum given to John Colville. Foulis was instructed to pay from the subsidy money which he was still waiting for.

James wrote to Foulis to continue asking for the money, pointed to agreements made in 1588 and a promise made by the ambassador William Asheby. James Hudson wrote to Robert Cecil about the king's letter, saying that Foulis was "perplexed with fear" about the outcome. Hudson suggested that Scotland's exchequer was now solvent, and withholding the money would only hurt the king and Thomas Foulis and Robert Jousie who administered the money. Roger Aston later noted that Thomas Foulis and Jousie had persuaded James VI not to recall Foulis before he obtain the subsidy money. David Foulis received £3,000 on 18 September. In October David Foulis was ready to leave London with seven trunks, three with goods for the Scottish royal household, and some packs and hampers of broad cloth, kerseys, and silks.

=== Succession tracts ===
The English diplomat George Nicholson reported in February 1598 that Foulis had directed the printer Robert Waldegrave to publish a Latin succession tract written by Walter Quinn, a tutor to Prince Henry and corrected by a Flemish resident in Edinburgh, Adrian Damman. Such works argued that James VI should be Elizabeth's successor. Waldegrave was reluctant to print it. No copies of this work are known to have survived. It has also been suggested that Foulis smuggled manuscripts of succession tracts by Peter Wentworth from England to be printed in Edinburgh. This work was A Pithie Exhortation to her Majesty for Establishing a Successor to the Crown, printed by Waldegrave in 1598.

=== Valentine Thomas and the king's honour ===
In 1598 Foulis was sent as an ambassador in England to discuss the Valentine Thomas affair. Thomas alleged that James VI had asked him to assassinate Elizabeth, an accusation that might prejudice his succession to the English throne. By 24 February, James VI was displeased with Foulis's efforts, for overreaching his instructions and accepting an unsatisfactory settlement, obtaining "so slight a vindication of honour in the matter of Valentine Thomas contrary to his instructions, dangerous to his succession to the Crown of England." James VI wrote to Elizabeth about potential damage to his reputation which "may in some measure be obscured by murmuring surmises flowing from this filthy spring."

The English ambassador in Scotland Robert Bowes discussed Foulis's suitability for this delicate mission with Sir Robert Ker, saying that Foulis was too ordinary a man for an extraordinary business, and some of his previous diplomatic speeches had not been praiseworthy. Ker spoke in Foulis's favour, to soothe Bowe's "mean conceit of him."

He was instructed to intercede in a legal case for George Bruce of Carnock, whose ship had been forced to take on a group of African and Portuguese captives. Business at court in August was interrupted by the funeral of William Cecil and later in August Elizabeth complained to him about James VI writing to the Earl of Tyrone. He was questioned about a Scottish embassy to the German states instructed to discuss the likely demise of Queen Elizabeth and their support for James VI's title to the English throne, and instructions for negotiations with Spain and the Pope which James VI claimed were forgeries made by John Ogilvy of Powrie or other "practitioners". Foulis brought back a sapphire engraved by Cornelius Dregghe with the portrait of Elizabeth for Anne of Denmark to wear, bought by Robert Jousie for £17.

Richard Douglas wrote to his uncle Archibald Douglas, who disapproved of Foulis and his employment, that Foulis was a fool and Archibald's dire enemy, and that James had begun to realise that Foulis was a "foolish person" and he would not be sent to England again. In May 1599, James VI tried to shift the blame onto Foulis when Elizabeth was displeased with his negotiations in Germany and with Anne of Denmark's relations to gather support for his succession to the English throne.

In August 1599, James Sempill of Beltrees went to London instead, and gave £400 to the goldsmith George Heriot from the English annuity, for jewels delivered to Anna of Denmark.

In September 1599, he had dinner at Colinton castle with his brother and an English adventurer, Henry Lee. They were able to watch the king hunting from top of the tower or "house head." James VI stopped to eat and afterwards talked with Lee.

Foulis was again in London in December 1601. He wrote to the Earl of Mar about some jewels and that he was displeased by the actions of James Sempill of Beltrees. In the "secret correspondence" between James VI and England, Foulis was known as "9".

=== England ===
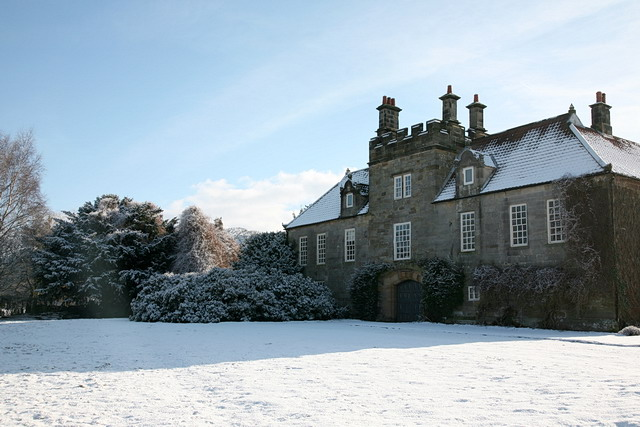
Foulis bought Ingleby Manor in 1608

Escutcheon of the Foulis baronets of Ingleby

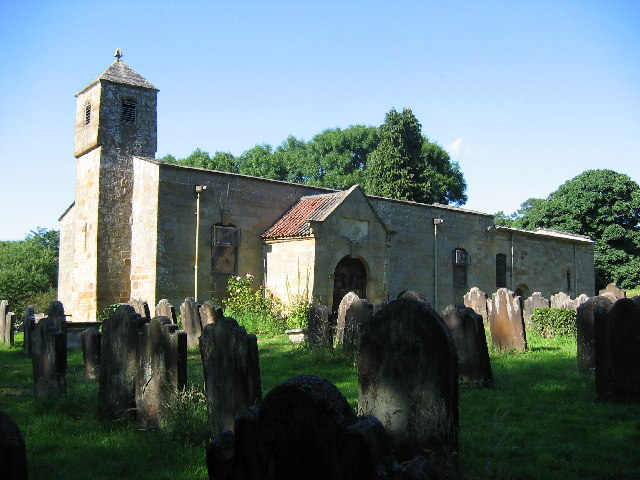
Foulis was buried at Ingleby Greenhow

King James sent Foulis to Sir Robert Cecil after he received news of the death of Queen Elizabeth I from Sir Robert Carey. Foulis came to England ahead of King James in April 1603, and was knighted on 13 May. With other Scottish courtiers he was admitted to Gray's Inn on 22 May.

Foulis was created honorary M.A. at Oxford 30 August 1605; and was naturalised by act of parliament in April 1606. He obtained with Lord Sheffield and others in 1607 a patent for making alum in Yorkshire; purchased the manors of Ingleby and Battersby from Ralph, Lord Eure, in 1609; and was made a baronet of England 6 February 1619–20. He acted as cofferer to both Prince Henry and Prince Charles.

In May 1610 Prince Henry sent him to Bath with news of the assassination of Henry IV of France for his cousin Frederick Ulrich, son of the Duke of Brunswick, who cut short his visit and returned to London. A copy of a royal household edict and roll of servant's wages that Foulis paid in 1610 for the household of Prince Charles was published in 1802 by Edmund Turnor.

Sir David, high in the favour of James I, was the recipient in 1614 of the notorious letter of advice to the king sent from Italy by Sir Robert Dudley, titular duke of Northumberland. In 1629 Foulis gave evidence respecting the document after it had been discovered in the library of Sir Robert Bruce Cotton. Dudley also sent designs for warships to Foulis in 1612 and 1614, hoping by these schemes to gain advancement by means of the royal favourite, the Earl of Somerset.

As member of the Council of the North he chafed against Thomas Wentworth's despotic exercise of the president's authority, and in July 1632 not only denied that the council existed by parliamentary authority, but charged Wentworth with malversation of the public funds. Wentworth indignantly repudiated the accusation, and Foulis appealed in vain to Charles I for protection from Wentworth's vengeance while offering to bring the gentry of Yorkshire to a better temper. He was dismissed from the council, was summoned before the Star Chamber, was ordered to pay £5,000 to the Crown and £3,000 to Wentworth, and was sent to the Fleet Prison in default (1633). There he remained till the Long parliament released him, 16 March 1641.

Foulis appeared as a witness against Strafford at the trial in 1641. He died at Ingleby in 1642.

== Family ==
By his wife Cordelia, daughter of William Fleetwood of Great Missenden, Buckinghamshire—she died in August 1631 and was buried at Ingleby—Foulis was father of five sons and three daughters.

The eldest son and second baronet, Sir Henry, was fined £500 by the Star Chamber when his father was punished in 1633; was lieutenant-general of horse under Sir Thomas Fairfax in 1643; married Mary, eldest daughter of Sir Thomas Layton, knight, of Sexhowe, and was father of Henry Foulis. A second son, Robert, was a colonel in the parliamentary army. .

A daughter, Anne Foulis, married the physician, George Purves in 1639.

The youngest daughter was Elizabeth Foulis, baptised 30 April 1622 at Ingleby Greenhow. A tradition held by one Yorkshire branch of the Foulds family in Harthill, Co. York, is that Elisabeth Foulis, at the age of 16, when a maid of honour at the French Court at Lyons, 1638–40, had a son by Louis XIII. This son or a descendant is stated to have left France and settled in England and changed his name to Folds. Elizabeth Foulis’ Will was proved at York on 14 September 1696. She died a spinster and there is nothing in her Will to suggest an illegitimate son by Louis XIII.

In 1899 a petition to the Herald College for a Grant of Arms was made by an Eliza Ann Foulds, youngest daughter of Samuel Foulds (1780-1828), surgeon and apothecary of Sheffield, based on the family tradition of his descent from the illegitimate son of Elizabeth Foulis by Louis XIII. This was not proved to the satisfaction of the Herald College, however a Grant of Arms was made (71 130) and a compromise Coat of Arms was drawn up by the College, incorporating a fleur de lys, symbol of the French Court, bay leaves from the Foulis coat of arms and the White Rose of Yorkshire.

The baronetcy became extinct on the death of the eighth baronet, the Rev. Sir Henry Foulis, on 7 October 1876

Through his grandson, the third baronet Foulis is an ancestor of actor Benedict Cumberbatch.

Baronetage of England
New creation	Baronet (of Ingleby); 1620–1642	Succeeded by Henry Foulis
