= Marie Axton =

- Born: Marie Horine; 1937; Cleveland, Ohio, U.S.
- Died: January 30, 2014 (aged 76–77)
- Occupation: Professor

Academic background
- Education: Radcliffe College, bachelor's; Girton College, Cambridge, Ph.D.
- Academic advisor: M. C. Bradbrook

Marie Axton (1937–2014), birth name Marie Horine, was an American scholar of Elizabethan drama, who made her academic career in the United Kingdom. She married Richard Axton of Christ's College, Cambridge in 1962. In 1979 she became the first woman appointed a junior proctor by the University of Cambridge.

Publishing as Marie Axton, she innovated in the study of the succession tracts and related literature, in relation to the debate on the succession to Elizabeth I. In particular she interpreted the succession tract of Edmund Plowden, a Catholic supporter of the claims of Mary, Queen of Scots, and contributed to the discussion of Gorboduc, an early Elizabethan drama from the Inns of Court.

== Background ==
She was born in Cleveland, Ohio, the daughter of Charles "Chuck" Horine (1912–1998) and his first wife Kathryn "Katie" Kunkel Horine (died 1965). Her parents had been students together at Ohio Wesleyan. Kathryn had taken lead roles in undergraduate productions of East Lynne and Liliom, in the latter with Charles. In 1931 she was a Fellow in the school of speech there. She then took a job with the British puppetmaster Shirley Braithwaite (Mayfair Marionettes), in which Charles also became involved. The couple got married.

During the 1930s Charles and Kathryn were based in Cleveland. They worked for Tatterman Marionettes, who under William Duncan Ireland and Edward Mabley were at the Century of Progress world fair in Chicago, and toured a production of Peer Gynt, and Bil Baird. From 1941 to 1945 Charles Horine worked for Westinghouse.

From 1946 Charles Horine had a successful career in New York, as a comedy writer for radio and television. He was hired by Arthur Godfrey. He also wrote as a playwright.

== Life ==
Marie Horine was an only child, brought up in the puppeteering milieu of Depression-era touring, sometimes staying with grandparents. When the family moved to New York and began to prosper, she went to New Lincoln School. She graduated from Radcliffe College with majors in Literature and History and Phi Beta Kappa. She went for a postgraduate year at Girton College, Cambridge, and remained then in the United Kingdom. She took Part II of the Cambridge English Tripos, arranged medieval drama productions in the courtyard of The Eagle, with her future husband Richard Axton, and began research under M. C. Bradbrook.

Axton married, and completed a Ph.D. After her mother died in 1965, and her husband became a college Fellow, she concentrated on her family of two children for a period. Once they were of school age, she began to write her first book, the Queen's Two Bodies. It won the 1978 Whitfield Prize of the Royal Historical Society. It resulted in her election to a Research Fellowship at Newnham College, which she held to 1999. She also became a lecturer in the English Department of Cambridge University, was on the Theatres Syndicate overseeing the ADC Theatre, and involved herself with Cambridge University Opera.

Marie and Richard Axton undertook archival work for the Seigneur of Sark, resulting in a calendar of documents being published in 1992 by HMSO. Marie died on Sark having suffered for many years from Parkinson's disease, on 30 January 2014.

== Works ==
Axton's 1977 book The Queen's Two Bodies: Drama and the Elizabethan Succession (1977) looked, in general terms, at the civic engagement of dramatists. Axton wrote in it that "Queen Elizabeth's playwrights shared Hieronymo's assumption that the action of a play could decisively alter the course of real events". It was concerned, more precisely, with the application of the legal doctrine of the king's two bodies to the succession question in England, particularly in a covert way in dramas associated with the inns of court. The concept of the body politic was, according to Kevin Sharpe, "the most familiar of all analogues for the commonweal", with classical roots; but the Renaissance saw also the "body natural" compared to the state. On the other hand, Claire McEachern credits Axton for showing that "far from being a disinterested and general cultural commonplace, the "body politic" had quite a specific polemical life".

Benedict S. Robinson wrote in The Arden Handbook of Shakespeare and Early Modern Drama:

The distinction between the king's two bodies—the physical body of the monarch, and the immaterial and immortal body politic of the realm—was translated into scholarship on early modern drama

by this book. Andrew Hadfield noted that Axton treats the theory of the doctrine put forward by Plowden as contentious at the time, rather than common ground. He wrote:

In excellent discussions covering the Inns of Court revels, court entertainments, and popular drama of the period, she explores the development of a complex symbolic vocabulary, for implicit exhortation, criticism and praise of the queen, and for veiled debate over the troubled question of the succession.

A reviewer, Joel Hurstfield, called establishing Axton's claims a "major revisionist assignment". He wrote:

... Dr Axton has shown that the Elizabethan theatre provided an important forum for contemporary observations on the succession-question when its discussion in parliament and pamphlet was blocked.

He was most positive about the attention given to minor dramas such as The Misfortunes of Arthur, while withholding judgement on the doctrine's overall standing. A review by Eric Ives commended the political analysis of Shakespeare's The Phoenix and the Turtle, but regretted the absence of liaison with work of Frances Yates and Roy Strong on the "cult of Elizabeth". In a paper on masques that appeared also in 1977, Axton commented on Endimion by John Lyly as "resistance and criticism of the virgin ideal" inherent in the cult.

=== Gorboduc ===
Gorboduc from 1561, early in the reign of Elizabeth I, also known as Ferrex and Porrex, is a tragedy about two claimants to the British throne, and is the earliest drama in the scope of Axton's work. Her views on its context evolved. The co-authors were Thomas Norton and Thomas Sackville, and it was given at the Inner Temple on 27 December 1561. Axton's view that Gorboduc, which was in time published, was the first "succession tract", received wide scholarly support.

The other part of the revels, complementary to Gorboduc, was a varied entertainment including a masque, "Beauty and Desire" (also called Pallophilos). It was published, in a prose adaptation as a story, by Gerard Legh in his Accedens of Armory (1562), a book mostly about heraldry. Scholars accept that Gorboduc taken with "Beauty and Desire" were intended to forward Robert Dudley's prospects of marrying the Queen. In a paper of 1970 Axton made points about "Beauty and Desire":

1. The story itself was not original, but based on a tale from The Pastime of Pleasure of 1555 by Stephen Hawes.
2. The successful wooing is made to depend on a "two bodies" distinction, already made in Elizabeth's coronation pageant of 1558, and pointed up by Roy Strong.
3. The heraldic material in the book is not neutral. As pointed up long previously, by John Gough Nichols, escutcheons were included flattering to contemporary lawyers and judges. With greater relevance to the succession debate, a heraldic gaffe was mentioned, made by Mary, Queen of Scots while in France.

In her 2004 biography of Norton in the Oxford Dictionary of National Biography, Axton made some points about Gorboduc:

1. "Until recently" it was taken that the play advocated for Catherine Grey to be seen as the presumptive successor for the Queen.
2. It was given at the Inner Temple revels sponsored by Robert Dudley, who was the brother-in-law of the late Lady Jane Grey.
3. Norton was, however, not a client of Dudley.
4. Sir Richard Sackville, father of Thomas Sackville, was more plausible than Norton as the party who invited Dudley to sponsor the performance.

The qualification in point #1 arose from the publication of BL Additional MS 48023, the anonymous "Journall" of Matters of State. (The authorship has been attributed most plausibly to John Hales: also to John Aylmer or Armagil Waad.) Michael Graves, biographer of Norton, decided that in the light of the "Journall", the succession tract aspect recedes in the face in the clear advocacy for Dudley's marriage to the Queen. Consequently Pallophilos was more important to the revels than Gorboduc.

=== Edited works ===
- English Drama: Forms and Development: Essays in Honour of Muriel Clara Bradbrook (1977), editor with Raymond Williams
- Nicholas Udall, Three Tudor Classical Interludes: Thersites, Jacke Jugeler, Horestes (1982)
- "Triumphs of English": Henry Parker, Lord Morley, Translator to the Tudor Court: New Essays in Interpretation (2000), editor with James Carley
