= Alexander Dicsone =

Scottish writer and political agent

Alexander Dicsone (also Dicson and Dickson, Italian: Alessandro Dicsono) (1558–1603) was a Scottish writer and political agent. He is known also as the leading Scottish disciple of Giordano Bruno. He used the pseudonym Heius Scepsius.

== Life ==
Dicsone was born in Perthshire, and studied at the University of St Andrews. He became a follower and personal friend of Bruno, who was in England during the years 1583 to 1585. It is considered probable that they met in this period, though not certain. Dicsone in any case was then in England, and became the outstanding disciple of Bruno in England and Scotland. He is mentioned in Bruno's dialogues, along with another British disciple ("Smith") who remains unidentified. Bruno and Dickson were part of the intellectual circle of Sir Philip Sidney.

Dicsone opposed Ramism, and was attacked in the Antidicsonus by "G.P." Now considered to be by William Perkins, it has also been attributed to Gerard Peeters. Walter Ong considered this dispute one of the major controversies over Ramism. Frances Yates argued that it should be considered as "over-lapping" with the debate of Bruno with the Aristotelians at Oxford, also in 1584. Perkins represented the Puritan view of mnemonic techniques based on images, which considered them tainted with idolatry, heresy, Catholicism and obscenity. With Bruno and Dicsone, Perkins mentioned in his dedicatory epistle Metrodorus of Scepsis and Cosma Rosselli.

The memory technique taught by Dicsone was questioned by Hugh Plat in 1594. It has been suggested that Dicsone was led to Bruno's memory theory by the requirement for memorable textbooks.

Dicsone was said to have worked for Philip Sidney. By 1588 Dicsone was working for Francis Hay, 9th Earl of Erroll. Hay was a Catholic and rebel, and Dicsone acted as a go-between for his master and the Scottish Kirk. He was mixture of spy and double agent, a position eventually untenable.

Dicsone was in trouble with James VI of Scotland for carrying letters from Charles Neville, 6th Earl of Westmorland, an English Catholic in exile. He declared himself a Catholic by the same year, 1591. He went on further continental travels, in the Catholic interest, with Peter Lowe. In the later 1590s James VI recruited him, and Dicsone wrote in James's causes.

According to the English diplomat George Nicholson, James VI employed Dicsone to write a treatise answering Doleman's A Conference about the Next Succession and advancing the king's title to the English throne. Dicsone was going through letters from Queen Elizabeth to help the argument in February 1598. His treatise titled Of the Right of the Crowne efter Hir Majesty was not published. Andrew Hunter wrote to Sir Robert Cecil in November 1598 that Dicsone was expected at The Hague and was an enemy to England. He is last heard of trying to bring John Davidson to heel, in 1603.

The secretary of Anne of Denmark, William Fowler sent news of Dicsone's death to Earl of Shrewsbury on 11 October 1603.

Thomas Murray's Elegy on his death appeared in 1604. His hermetic interests are considered an influence on Scottish "mason craft" (the precursor of freemasonry).

== Works ==
- De umbra rationis et judicii (1583). The Philological Museum; Alexander Dickson, De Umbra Rationis et Iudicii (1584), Online text
- Defensio pro Alexander Dicsono Arelio (1584). This work was under the pseudonym "Heius Scepsius", implying Dicsone was prepared to identify with (Metrodorus of) Scepsis, and accepted the "criticism" of using the signs of the Zodiac in memory technique.

Dicsone dedicated his books to Robert Dudley, 1st Earl of Leicester.
