= Secret correspondence of James VI =

Secret agreement by which James VI secured the British throne in 1601

King James VI of Scotland communicated in secret with the administrators of Queen Elizabeth I of England between May 1601 and her death in March 1603. In this period it was settled that James would succeed Elizabeth, his distant relative, but this result was kept a secret in a small diplomatic community. James's accession to the thrones of England and Ireland is known as the Union of the Crowns. From 1586 onwards James also received money from Elizabeth, an annual subsidy, which forged closer links.

== Prequel: Courting the Earl of Essex ==
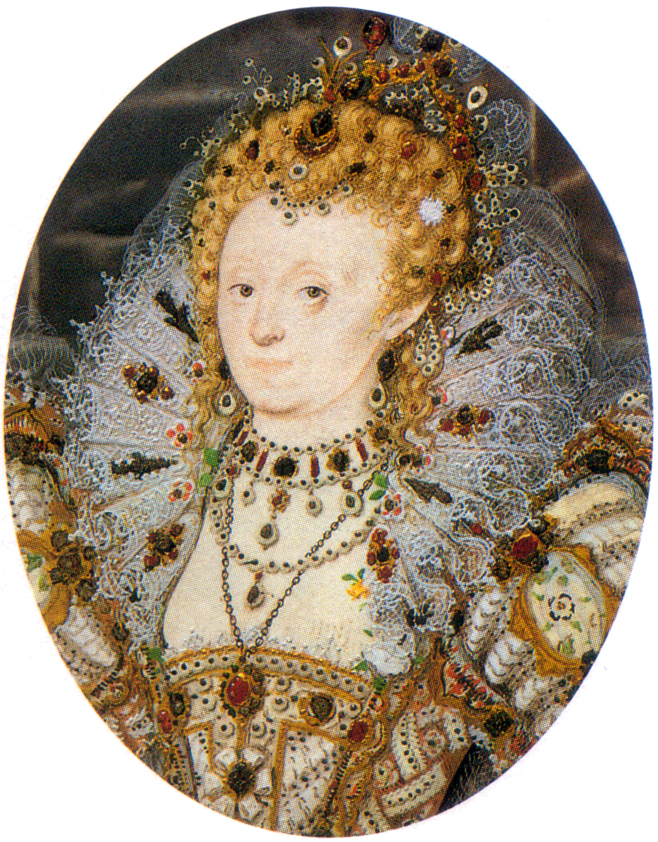
Elizabeth sent a miniature portrait by Nicholas Hilliard to Prince Henry at Stirling Castle.

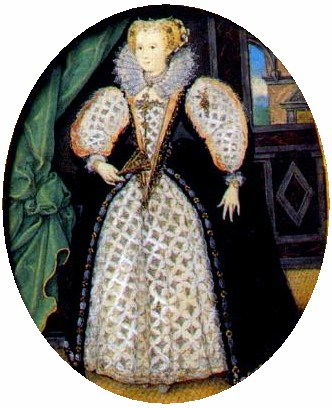
Anne of Denmark requested portraits of the Earl of Essex and Lady Rich.

Scottish diplomats including the resident James Hudson, a former court musician, the financier Thomas Foulis, and ambassadors including (Foulis' nephew) David Foulis, William Keith of Delny, and Edward Bruce, Commendator of Kinloss were in touch with the Earl of Essex and his secretary Anthony Bacon.

In 1594 James VI thought that the Earl of Essex was the most able and willing counsellor to Queen Elizabeth to serve his needs, and he felt that William Cecil and his son Sir Robert Cecil worked against him. In April 1594 James VI sent Bruce and James Colville of Easter Wemyss to London to complain about "secret intelligence" which had passed between the ambassador Lord Zouche and the rebel Earl of Bothwell. He wrote to the Earl of Essex asking for his support. In his letters of July, David Foulis called the Earl of Essex by the code name "Plato". Foulis was "Achates" and James VI was called "Tacitus".

Meanwhile, the Scottish diplomat Richard Cockburn of Clerkington wrote in friendly terms to Sir Robert Cecil, who replied on 17 September 1594. Cockburn wrote to Hudson on 22 May 1595 in the "spirit of prophecy" about the fortunes of his uncle the Chancellor of Scotland, John Maitland of Thirlestane and his adversaries.

In July 1595 John Maitland of Thirlestane wrote to the Earl of Essex to try to establish a correspondence, a future "diligent intercourse of intelligence" involving Richard Cockburn of Clerkington and Essex's secretary Anthony Bacon. Essex replied that he wrote only with the Queen's knowledge and that they would be happy to receive letters from Maitland or Cockburn.

The request of Anne of Denmark, the Scottish queen, for portraits of the Earl of Essex and his sister, meaning Lady Rich, reached Bacon in December 1595. James Hudson renewed the Scottish queen's request on 16 August 1596. In 1596 Elizabeth, via the Earl of Essex and Anthony Bacon, sent her miniature portrait by Nicholas Hilliard to Prince Henry, and this was received by his guardian, the Earl of Mar, at Stirling, according to Bacon's letter to Edward Bruce. Bacon sent Elizabeth's portrait represented "in exquisite workmanship" to Bruce on 1 October 1596.

James Hudson delivered Bacon's letters to James VI, who was alone in his chamber with Sir George Home, at Holyrood Palace in March 1596. The king read some carefully and laughed at others, and asked Hudson to return his "hearty and loving thanks". Hudson stressed to the king with such "secrecy and charge the papers were delivered". And so, wrote Hudson, "in his majesty's own presence I made a fire-sacrifice of all".

Bacon, discussing the security of Essex's correspondence, contrasted his letters to and from David Foulis and Hudson with Nicholson's letters to James VI, as "a public minister's letters to a king" with "letters betwixt private friends".

== Embassy of the Earl of Mar ==
John Erskine, Earl of Mar, and Edward Bruce went to London as ambassadors in February 1601, attempting to secure the throne of England for James VI. The Scottish ambassadors expected to negotiate with the Earl of Essex, but he was executed on 25 February 1601 before their arrival in London. Their first set of instructions are known from a summary by Essex's servant Henry Cuffe, who was condemned to hang.

James VI then gave his ambassadors new instructions that they should "walk surely between the precipices of the Queen and the people." He encouraged them to go forward in private negotiation and to secure the individual support of key towns and ports. Although Mar and Bruce gained the confidence of Robert Cecil and an understanding on the succession was reached, their success was kept secret.

At a meeting at the Duchy of Lancaster House, on the Strand, Cecil requested James not to seek an English parliamentary recognition of his claim to the throne, and that future correspondence with the Scottish ambassadors should be a secret from Elizabeth herself. The ambassadors returned to Scotland in May 1601. Until the death of Elizabeth on 24 March 1603, two exchanges of letters between England and Scotland were kept up: the usual communication and the "secret correspondence".

== Private and public letters ==
The private letters to Scotland were written by Robert Cecil and Henry Howard. James's letters were written by Mar, Bruce and perhaps Mar's kinsman, Thomas Erskine of Gogar. Some of the letters were sent to England as if they were meant for the Duke of Rohan in France and so arrived in England to be added to the "diplomatic bag". The 18th-century historian Thomas Birch suggested that a Scottish representative in London, James Hamilton and a colleague James Fullerton, were involved in sending the letters to Scotland. Hamilton had kept a school in Dublin, and later James made him Viscount Clandeboye. James Hamilton was accredited by James VI to reside in London by his letters to Elizabeth and Robert Cecil on 4 August 1600. James said that Hamilton would be a "remaining agent", the equivalent of George Nicolson in Edinburgh.

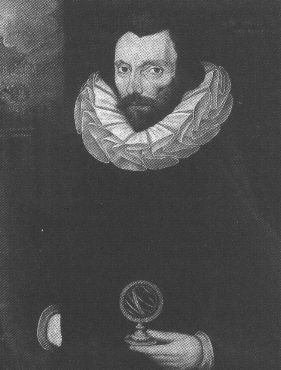
James VI of Scotland criticised Henry Howard's verbose writing style.

The English diplomat Henry Wotton later gave an anecdote that Elizabeth had once noticed mail arriving from Scotland. She demanded to see it, and Cecil made to open the satchel (which Wotton called a 'budget') but told the Queen it was filthy and smelled bad, and she could have the letters after they were aired. It remains unclear if Elizabeth was actually unaware of any detail of Cecil's negotiations, as the historian Geoffrey Elton assumed.

Henry Wotton himself came to Scotland in September 1601 from Florence. Posing as an Italian, Octavio Baldi, he met James and remained in character for three months. James discussed Wotton's arrival with Edward Bruce, Sir George Home, and the Earl of Mar. The English resident George Nicholson was unaware that the "Italian" was Wotton. Wotton later wrote that his mission was from Ferdinando de' Medici to advise James of a poison plot against him and bring a gift of antidotes.

Some of the letters, as was quite usual in diplomatic correspondence, used numbers to refer to individuals rather than names; James was '30', Mar was '20', Robert Cecil was '10', Bruce '8', and Northampton '3'. By June 1602, James wrote of how Cecil and his colleague "40" had "so easily settled me in the only right course for my good, [and] so happily preserved the Queen's mind from the poison of jealous prejudice."

The diplomat David Foulis wrote to the Earl of Mar for London on 3 December 1601, after the Duke of Lennox had left London. Foulis criticised a scheme, "a purpose", involving the Duke at the instigation of James Sempill of Beltrees and the lawyer Thomas Hamilton and thought the king should threaten them with hanging. Beltrees had written to "10", Sir Robert Cecil, in the Duke's name. Such diplomatic initiatives, outside the circle of the secret correspondents, were jealously resented.

A letter from number "7" mentions a list of English gentlewomen of the "greatest account" sent to King James. This was written when Elizabeth had a "rheum" in her arm and was losing sleep through grief for her former favourite, the Earl of Essex. "7" wanted Foulis to carry King James' letters to London.

A separate "public" correspondence between Elizabeth and James continued. The historian John Duncan Mackie thought that the tone of the public letters had become more cordial than in previous years. The irregular subsidy that Elizabeth paid to James (in cash or jewellery) was continued.

James VI sent Henry Howard, later Earl of Northampton, a jewel with three precious stones including a ruby as "his first token". James criticised Howard's writing style. In May 1602 he wrote how "my own laconic style" compared with Howard's "ample Asiatic and endless volumes". The 19th-century historian Patrick Fraser Tytler noted the excessive flattery used by Howard and the effort made to exclude others from the discussions. Although James noticed and challenged Howard's attempts to direct his actions with regard to other channels of communication, Tytler summed up their successful co-operation:

At all events, nothing could have been more secretly or adroitly managed than the whole correspondence between Howard, Cecil, and the Scottish king. No one had the least suspicion of the understanding that existed between the trio.

According to Godfrey Goodman, King James "wrote and did acknowledge that for some six years before the Queen died he held correspondence with [Cecil], and that he found him a very wise, able, faithful servant.

== Secrecy and the Scottish queen ==
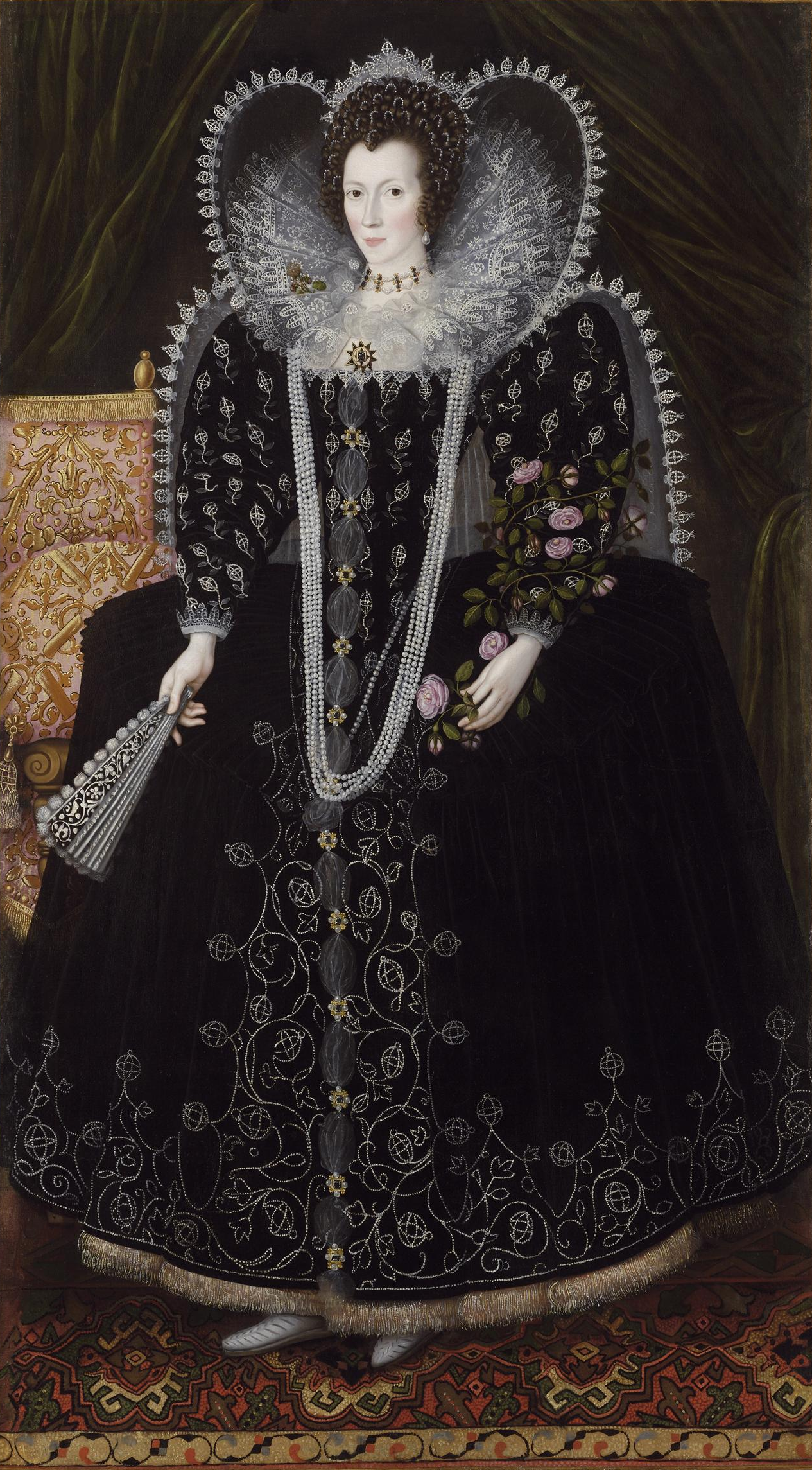
Frances Howard, Countess of Kildare, was resented by the "secret correspondents".

John Duncan Mackie noted that those unaware of the letters included the English resident agent in Scotland George Nicholson; the Master of Gray, an intriguer who served the Duke of Lennox; and James's own secretary James Elphinstone, 1st Lord Balmerino. One man outside the circle came to know of the letters, and his letter came into the hands of Bishop of Durham in March 1602. It mentions that James VI had kept up a correspondence with Robert Cecil for six months but still disliked him. The Bishop sent the letter to Cecil. Mackie thought the handwriting of this anonymous letter was William Fowler's, the poet and secretary to Anne of Denmark.

Anne of Denmark took a keen interest in the correspondence of James Sempill, a diplomat working for her husband. Generally, Anne of Denmark was perceived as a threat to the circle of correspondents because of her continued antagonism to the Earl of Mar and his cousin, Sir Thomas Erskine, because she resented Mar's guardianship of her son Prince Henry at Stirling Castle.

Frances Howard, Countess of Kildare, also tried to set up a correspondence with the Scottish court, and the Earl of Northampton tried to prevent her. After the death of Queen Elizabeth, the Countess of Kildare was one of the English women aristocrats who came to Scotland to seek Anne's favour, and she was appointed governess of Princess Elizabeth. Kildare had already impressed James Sempill, in September 1599 her Scottish servant named Dicksoun struck up an acquaintance with him in London, and said she had spoken in favour of the king's succession to the English throne at dinner with the Lord Admiral. Sempill wrote that Kildare passed the paper knife to the queen to open the king's letters. Kildare sent useful information to James VI from Elizabeth's court, and was rewarded for her service Henry Brooke, 11th Baron Cobham when her husband was disgraced.

King James evoked the idea of the secret correspondence in a letter of 5 August 1608 to Robert Cecil. He half jokingly refers to Cecil's current influence with Anne of Denmark, as a guider of a "feminine court". Cecil was again "Master 10" and the Earl of Northampton, number "3". James reminded Cecil of the anniversary of the Gowrie Conspiracy, back in the days "when you darest not avow me". Northampton had discussed his interest in regaining the queen's favour and confidence with Mar in January 1608.

== Sources ==
- Bruce, John, ed., Correspondence of King James VI of Scotland with Sir Robert Cecil and others in England, during the reign of Queen Elizabeth; with an appendix containing transactions between King James and Robert Earl of Essex (Camden Society: London, 1861)
- Courtney, Alexander, 'The Secret Correspondence of James VI, 1601-3', Susan Doran & Paulina Kewes, Doubtful and dangerous: The question of the succession in late Elizabethan England (Manchester, 2014),
- Dalrymple, David, Lord Hailes, ed., The Secret Correspondence of Robert Cecil with James I (Edinburgh, 1766)
- Mackie, J. D., Calendar of State Papers Scotland, vol. 13, 2 vols. (HMSO: Edinburgh, 1969)
- Wotton, Henry, Wotton, Henry, Reliquiae Wottonianae, or, A collection of lives, letters, poems, (London, 1672)
