= A Conference about the Next Succession =

1595 pseudonymous book by Doleman

A Conference about the Next Succession was a pseudonymous book published by "Doleman" (N. Doleman or R. Doleman; Sir John Hayward calls him "R. Dolman" in his 1603 An answer), and dealing with the succession to Elizabeth I of England. The cover date is 1594, but the real publication date is taken to be around September 1595, in Amsterdam. The author has traditionally been identified with Robert Persons, an English Jesuit exile. It has also been suggested that Doleman is a collective pseudonym.

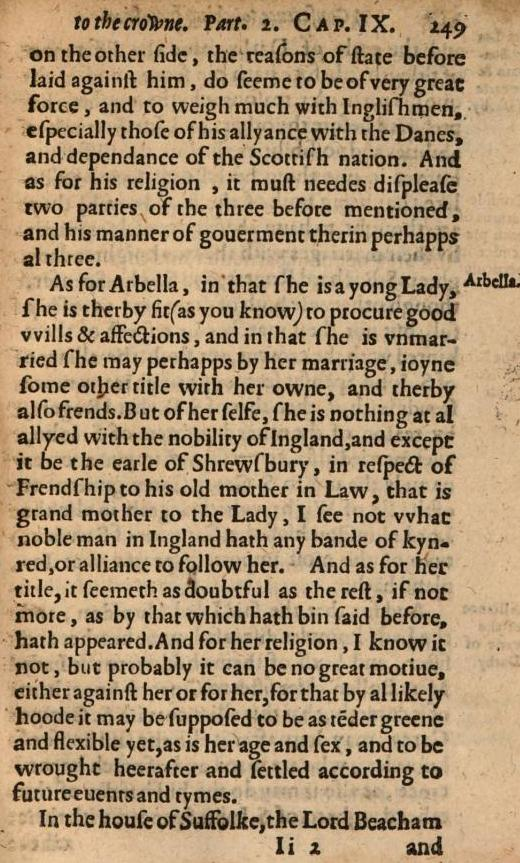
Page from A Conference about the Next Succession, on the future succession to Elizabeth I, discussing Lady Arbella Stuart

== Impact ==
A Conference was immediately effective in reopening the issue of the succession to Elizabeth, which at the time was difficult to debate in England. It provoked numerous replies, in the succession tract genre. It has also been considered a leading work of political thought of the period, arguing as it does in terms of resistance theory, and against the dynastic tradition of primogeniture. It was widely assumed at the time that the book's intention was to promote the claim to the English throne of Isabella Clara Eugenia.

== Background ==
The application of the concept of heir presumptive became increasing problematic, and less relevant, as Elizabeth's reign progressed. Until her death in 1568, it fitted quite well the claim of Lady Catherine Grey to the throne, under the terms of the will of Henry VIII. Mary, Queen of Scots had a leading dynastic claim to represent the House of Tudor, until her execution in 1587. Her son James VI of Scotland became then the most obvious successor, in terms of practical politics, but it was supposed that there might be legal arguments against his coming to the English throne. Such arguments had previously been developed against the claim of the Catholic Queen Mary; they could be applied to King James.

A Conference was intended as an intervention in the debate on the succession. It set out a large number of genealogical facts, suggested that other criteria should be used, and hinted at the risk of a return to the instability of the Wars of the Roses. It hit at King James's claim to the extent that it depended on the House of Lancaster. Reaching back to the end of the 14th century, it traced his descent from an illegitimate son of Katherine Swynford.

There had been a "succession crisis" in France from 1589, and from 1590 the Infanta Isabella Clara Eugenia had been the Spanish claimant. James VI has been taken as well-informed about the Gallican position on church and state, in his works on monarchy, and the French example remained significant for him to the later allegiance oath controversy.

== Content ==
The work comprised, in part, analysis of around 14 succession candidates, in terms of five lineages with royal pretensions (including the House of Aviz). It put into play the succession to the English throne, by suggesting that elective monarchy, rather than hereditary monarchy, was a more appropriate way to address the succession issue. That approach was rebutted in most of the subsequent tracts. Genealogical content was supplied by William Allen and Sir Francis Englefield.

== Political context of the work ==
Catholic political theory developed from the De iusta reipublicae christianae in reges impios et haereticos authoritate of William Rainolds (as Guilielmus Rossaeus, and perhaps writing with William Gifford), which was aimed at the French situation. The same general principles were then applied to England, probably by Persons, with Richard Verstegan and perhaps others.

The Conference proved divisive for English Catholics, since the invocation of resistance theory appeared treasonous to some. This point arose during the Appellant Controversy. The Jesuit inclusion of a Spanish claimant identified the work as pro-Spanish. Some lay Catholics and secular priests were strongly opposed to the work, as became manifest during the Controversy; and so the initial issue from about 1598, the appointment of an archpriest in England, became bound up with attitudes to the succession to the English throne.

James VI of Scotland was concerned by the work. According to the English diplomat in Edinburgh, George Nicholson, James VI employed Alexander Dickson to write a treatise answering Doleman's work and advancing his title to the English throne. Dickson was going through letters from Queen Elizabeth to James to help the argument. Dickson's treatise was titled Of the Right of the Crowne efter Hir Majesty.

== Later editions ==
Persons produced a Latin version of the work, in 1597, with significant changes. It was based on the second half of the English original, with the addition of material on papal authority. A selection reprinted as Severall speeches at a conference concerning the power of parliament, to proceed against their king for misgovernment (1648–9) has been attributed to Henry Walker.
