= Charles Arundell =

English gentleman (??–1587)

Sir Charles Arundell (died 9 December 1587), was an English gentleman, lord of the manor of South Petherton, Somerset, notable as an early Roman Catholic recusant and later as a leader of the English exiles in France. He has been suggested as the author of Leicester's Commonwealth, an anonymous work which attacked Queen Elizabeth's favourite, the Earl of Leicester.

== Early life and background ==
Arundell was the son of Sir Thomas Arundell (who was attainted and executed in 1552) and of Margaret Howard (died 1571), a sister of Queen Katherine Howard. His maternal grandparents were Lord Edmund Howard (died 1539), the third son of Thomas Howard, 2nd Duke of Norfolk, and Joyce Culpeper (c. 1480–1531). His great aunt Elizabeth, Countess of Wiltshire, was the mother of Anne Boleyn, who was thus the first cousin of Arundell's mother as well as being the mother of Queen Elizabeth I, and his ancestors on his mother's side included the Varangian chieftain Rurik (ca. 830–879), founder of the Rurikid dynasty which went on to rule Muscovy and several other states.

According to Agnes Strickland, his mother Margaret Howard, Lady Arundel was a Lady Attendant to Katherine Howard, her sister the Queen.

Little is known of Arundell's early life. He had an older brother, Matthew, and two sisters, Dorothy and Jane. In 1554, two years after their father's execution, the Arundell brothers were restored in blood and the elder eventually succeeded in regaining most of their father's estates in Dorset and Wiltshire, including Wardour Castle.

== Life ==
Matthew Arundell, as head of the family, regained most of Sir Thomas Arundell's lost estates, while to Charles Arundell came the manor of South Petherton in Somerset.

Unlike his brother, Arundell was openly a recusant. With their cousin Lord Henry Howard (later created Earl of Northampton), he was briefly imprisoned in the Tower of London at Christmas 1580, after both had been denounced by Edward de Vere, 17th Earl of Oxford, as traitors and spies of Philip II of Spain. Both were formerly friends of the Queen, but according to Oxford's biographer Charleton Ogburn Jr., Howard spent the balance of the year 1581 under restraint. Arundell apparently remained imprisoned until 1583, when he would go altogether over to the Spanish side. Following his release, Arundell spent several months under house arrest. Neither he nor Howard ever returned to court favour, and after the Throckmorton Plot of 1583 in support of Mary, Queen of Scots, Arundell fled to Paris with Thomas, Lord Paget, the elder brother of the conspirator Charles Paget. In August 1584 there appeared in England Leicester's Commonwealth, a brilliant and anonymous tract of Roman Catholic propaganda which attacked the Queen's favourite, the Earl of Leicester, and the political and religious policy of the English government, in particular the Puritan sympathies of Leicester, who was portrayed as an amoral opportunist. At that time Arundell was seen as a leader of the English Roman Catholic exiles. As early as 1947 Arundell was described as "the now generally admitted author of that Elizabethan masterpiece", and in his critical edition of Leicester's Commonwealth (1985), Dwight C. Peck argued that Arundell was probably the lead author among the group of exiles in Paris. Recently historians have tended to agree with the view that several English Catholic exiles based in France may have worked on the text, including Charles Arundell, his associate Charles Paget, and Paget's brother, Thomas, Lord Paget.

Arundell was reported to have pawned his valuables to raise money for an armed landing in England to be led by the Earl of Westmorland in support of Mary, Queen of Scots. In Paris he worked with the Archbishop of Glasgow, Mary's trusted representative in France. Arundell was a cousin of Douglass Howard, Lady Sheffield, the wife of Sir Edward Stafford (1552–1605), the English ambassador in Paris, and had a role in putting Stafford into secret contact with Bernardino de Mendoza (c. 1540–1604), the ambassador in Paris of Philip of Spain. Early in 1587, Arundell acted secretly as a mediator between them to offer Stafford's services to Philip as a spy, when Arundell received two thousand crowns to pass on to Stafford.

Arundell died in Paris in 1587—in the year of the Singeing the King of Spain's Beard, during the Anglo-Spanish War which had begun in 1585—perhaps having been poisoned. It is sometimes claimed that his knighthood was bestowed on him by Philip of Spain, but he died in possession of the manor of South Petherton, which was inherited by his brother, Sir Matthew, and in the inquisition post mortem taken on 12 March 1588 he is named as "Sir Charles Arundell of London, Knt."
