= Peter Lowe (surgeon) =

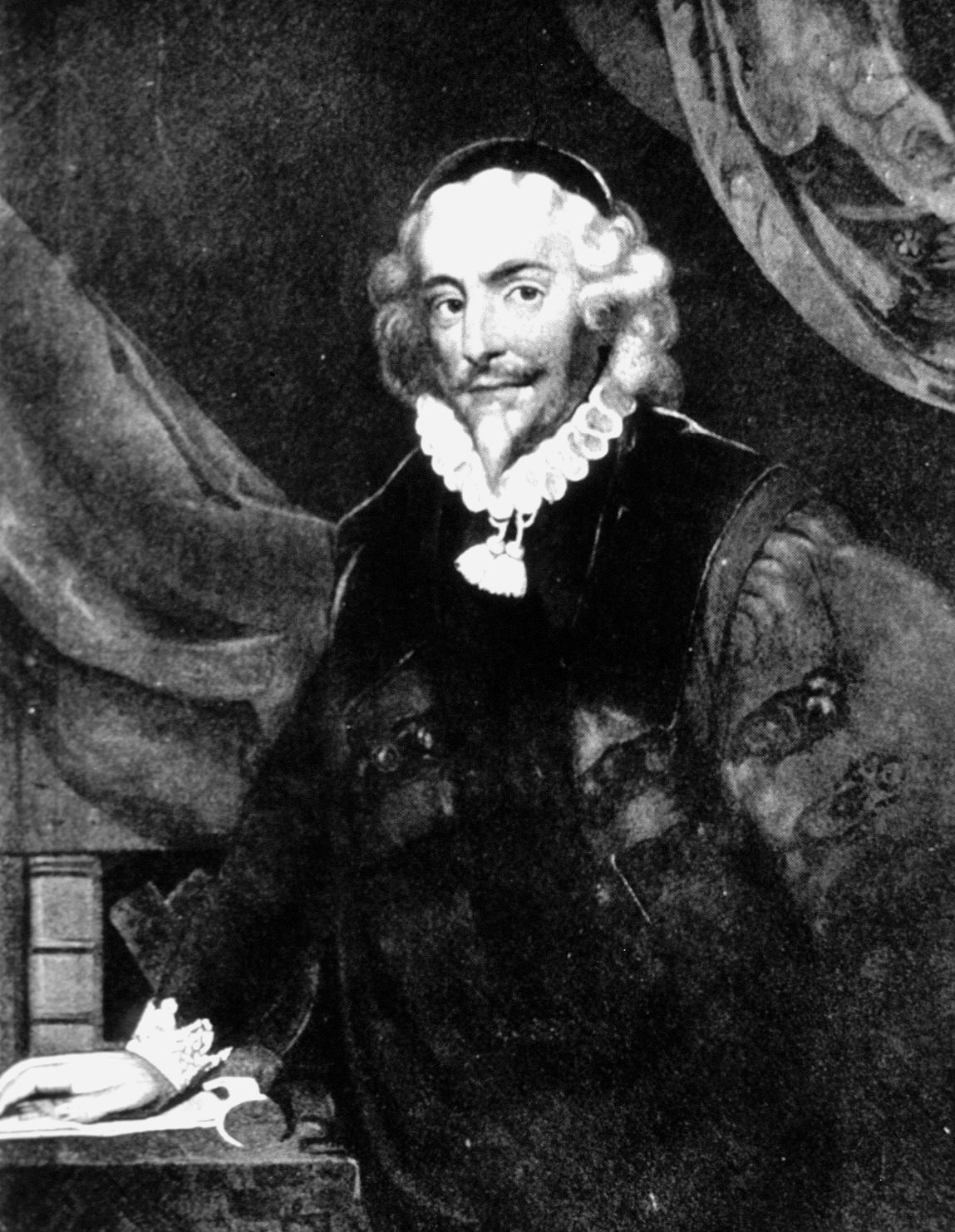
Peter Lowe

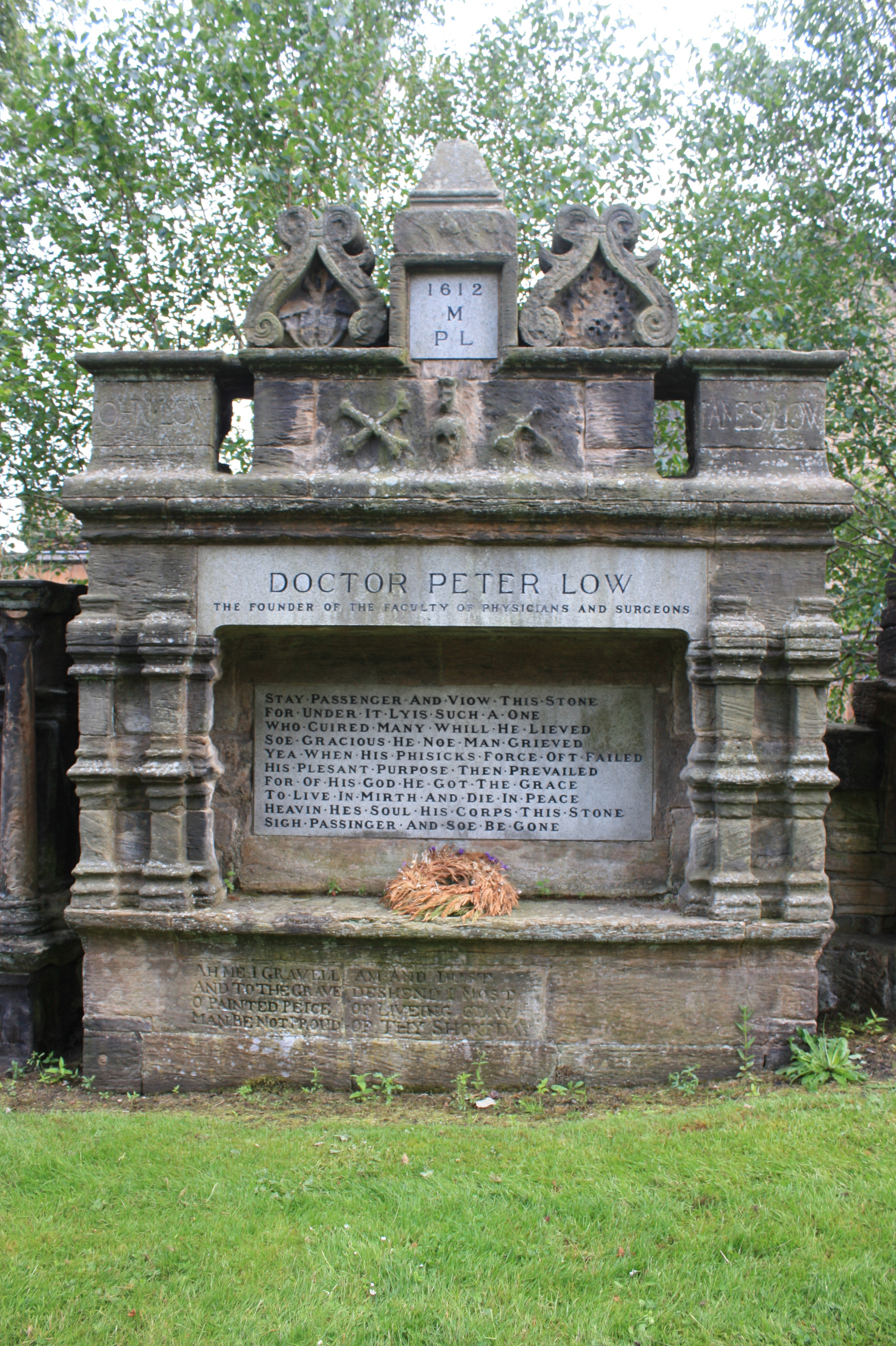
The grave of Peter Low, Glasgow Cathedral churchyard

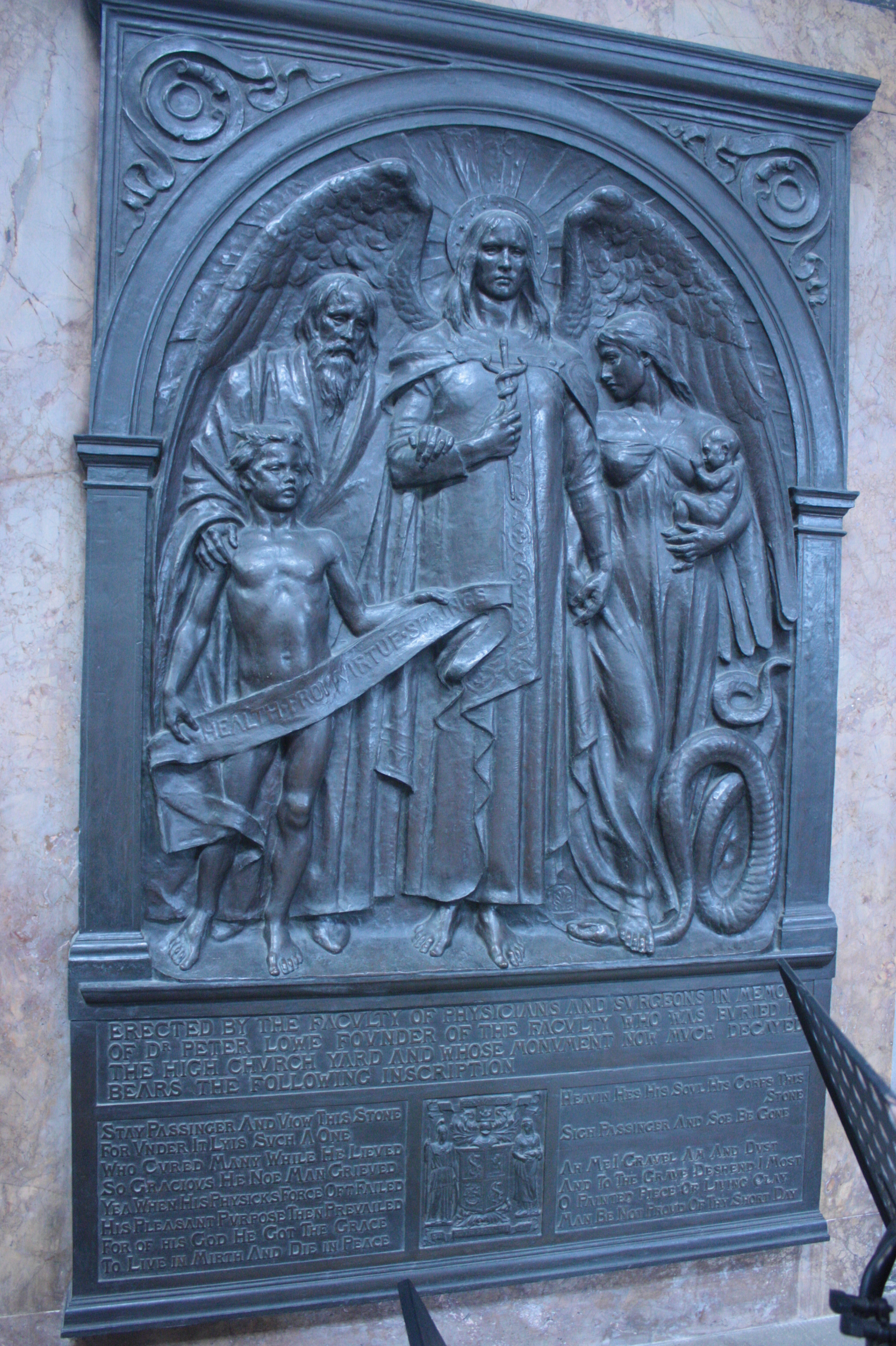
Monument to Dr Peter Lowe, inside Glasgow Cathedral

Peter Lowe or Low (c. 1550 – 1610) was a surgeon and founder of the institution now known as the Royal College of Physicians and Surgeons of Glasgow.

== Biography ==
Lowe was born in Scotland around 1550 and left in 1565 to study medicine on the Continent. He completed his studies in Paris and by 1589 he was chirurgian (surgeon) major to the Spanish Regiment in the service of Philip II of Spain at the siege of Paris. In the early 1590s he travelled in England with Alexander Dickson, the secretary to the Earl of Errol, who, like his master, was a Catholic. While there he surveyed several harbours, sending details back to James VI in Scotland. On his return to France he was appointed chirurgian ordinary to Henry IV of France.

On his return to Scotland, he settled in Glasgow around 1598. He found that the practice of medicine in the west of the country was in the hands of "cosoners, quack-salvers, charlitans, witches, charmers, and divers other sorts of abusers." He petitioned the King, then James VI, and was granted a Charter which enabled the foundation of a medical incorporation for physicians and surgeons. The college later expanded to include dentists, making it the only institution in the British Isles to admit all three professions.

Lowe was dispatched by James VI in 1601 to accompany the Earl of Lennox on a mission to King Henry's court in Paris. In Glasgow he married as his second wife, Helen Wemyss, the daughter of the first Protestant minister of the Cathedral.

He died in 1610 and is buried in the grounds of Glasgow Cathedral against the southern boundary wall, where his grave is marked by a large monument.

A large 19th-century bronze memorial to his memory also exists on the inner north wall within Glasgow Cathedral.

== Family ==
He married Helen Weems, daughter of Rev David Weems of the High Kirk of Glasgow. They had a son, John Lowe.

== Writings ==
- Spanish Sickness (1596)
- A Discourse on the Whole Art of Chirurgerie ["Surgery"] (1597)

== Artistic recognition ==
A contemporary portrait of Lowe is held at the Faculty of Physicians and Surgeons in Glasgow.
