= John Davies of Hereford =

16th/17th-century Anglo-Welsh poet

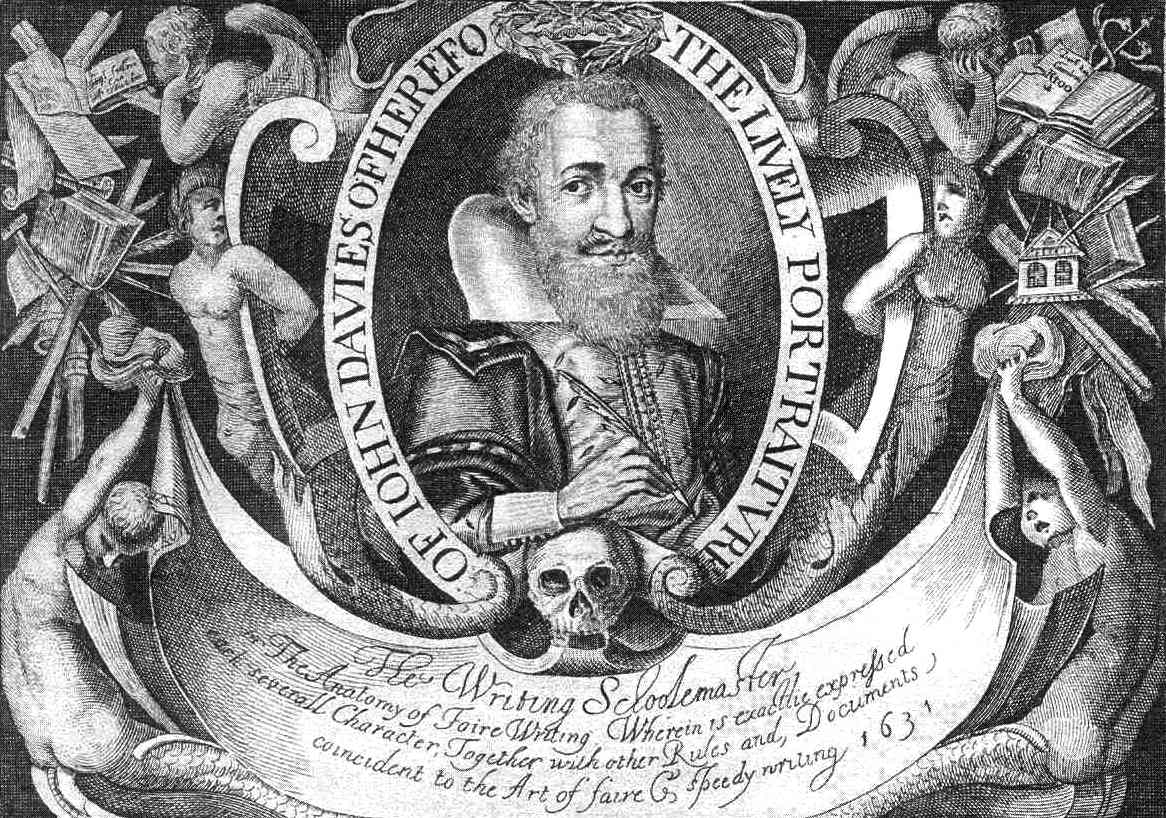
Portrait from title page of The Writing Schoolemaster 2nd ed. (1636)

John Davies of Hereford (c. 1565 – July 1618) was a writing-master and an Anglo-Welsh poet. He referred to himself as John Davies of Hereford (after the city where he was born) in order to distinguish himself from others of the same name, particularly the contemporary poet Sir John Davies (1569–1626).

== Writing career ==
Davies wrote very copiously on theological and philosophical themes, some of which brought proto-scientific ideas into the public arena.

Davies was a friend of Edmund Ashfield, and wrote in an epigram that he nearly accompanied Ashfield on his journey to Scotland in 1599. He wrote many epigrams and verses on his contemporaries including Elizabeth Cary which have some historical interest. He celebrated some of his pupils in verse in The Scourge of Folly, including Lady Anne Tracy and Lady Elizabeth Baskerville, the daughters of Thomas Coningsby.

In 1612, he dedicated his Muses Sacrifice to three "darlings, patronesses of the Muses"; Lucy Russell, Countess of Bedford, Mary, Countess of Pembroke, and Elizabeth Cary.

John Davies died in London.

== Works ==
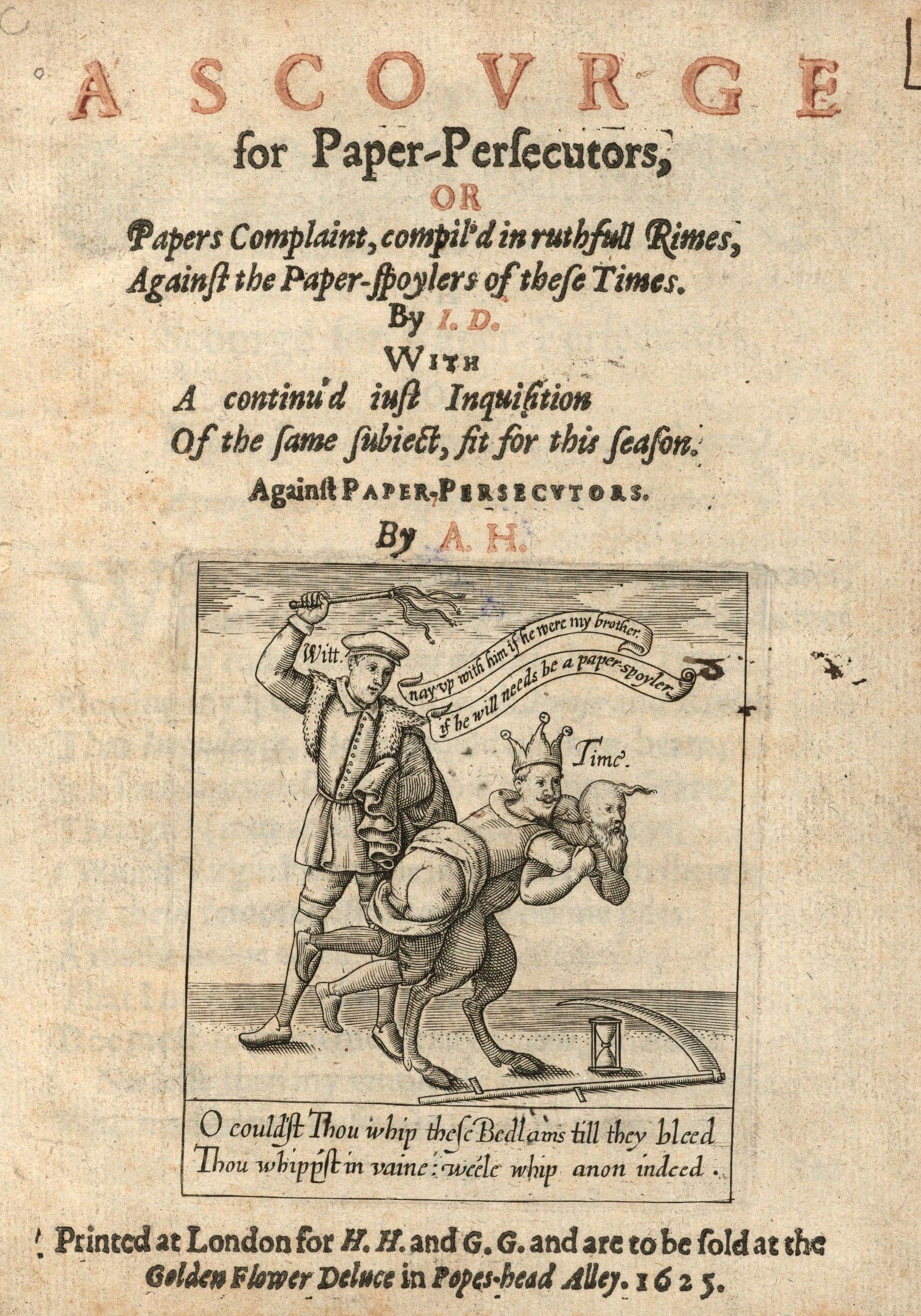
Title page of The Scourge of Folly (1625 edition), depicting Wit scourging Folly mounted on the back of Time.

- Mirum in Modum, a Glimpse of God's Glory and the Soul's Shape (1602)
- Microcosmos (1603)
- Wittes Pilgrimage (1605?)
- Bien Venu (1606)
- Summa Totalis (1607)
- Humours Heav'n on Earth (1609)
- The Holy Roode (1609)
- The Scourge of Folly (1611)
- The Muse's Sacrifice (1612)
- The Picture of a Happy Man (1612)
- A Select Second Husband for Sir Thomas Overburie's Wife (1616)
- Wit's Bedlam (1617)

These rare editions were compiled by Reverend Alexander Balloch Grosart (1827–1899) into a two-volume edition privately printed in one hundred copies in 1875 and 1878 at the Edinburgh University Press by Thomas and Archibald Constable as part of the "Chertsey Worthies' library" subscription series. The complete works of John Davies of Hereford (15??-1618) was "for the first time collected and edited: with memorial introduction, notes and illustrations, glossarial index, and portrait and facsimile, &c." Grosart indicated for several of the poems that there was only one extant copy known.

=== A Lover's Complaint ===
In a 2007 monograph, Shakespeare, "A Lover's Complaint," and John Davies of Hereford, Brian Vickers attributes to Davies the poem "A Lover's Complaint", which was published by Thomas Thorpe with Shakespeare's Sonnets in 1609. This attribution goes against scholarly consensus, and in particular studies by Kenneth Muir, Eliot Slater and MacDonald P. Jackson, but is based on both a detailed demonstration of the non-Shakespearean nature of the poem and a list of numerous verbal parallels—such as 'What brest so cold that is not warmed heare' and 'What heart's so cold that is not set on fire'—between the Complaint and the known works of Davies. On Vickers's attribution it was omitted from the 2007 RSC Shakespeare Complete Works, a decision Jackson called a mistake in his RES review of Vickers's book, arguing, among other reservations, that "Evidence that, in poems undoubtedly his, Davies exhibits an intimacy with Shakespeare's works equal to that of the author of 'A Lover's Complaint' is very meagre."
