= List of Elizabethan succession tracts =

The succession tracts of the Elizabethan period, continuing into the reign of James I of England, debated the legal status, and other attributes, of candidates to succeed Elizabeth I of England.

== Early tracts ==
Year	Author	Title	Comment
1563	John Hales	Declaration	An innovative treatise, it argued against Mary Queen of Scots and Margaret Douglas, and pushed forward the claim of Lady Catherine Grey.
1565	Anonymous	Allegations against the surmised title of the Queen of Scotland	Printed, but extant only in manuscript. It supported the Suffolk claim, insisted on Scotland as foreign country, and cited the precedent of John of England, who succeeded ahead of Arthur I, Duke of Brittany who was foreign born.
1565(?)	Anthony Browne
1566		An Answer to "Allegations against ..."
1566, or 1565		Anti-Suffolk tract	William Atwood attributed it to a Thomas Morgan (T. M.).
1566	Anonymous	"A Letter"
1567	Edmund Plowden, unpublished	A Treatise ... Proving the Queen of Scots by her Birth is Not Disabled by the Law of England [...]	Against Hales, Plowden argues that the statute of Edward III, on aliens and inheritance, cannot be applied to the body politic involved in the succession. William Maitland of Lethington, acting for Mary, had anticipated to William Cecil the application of the common law to the issue.
1569	John Lesley		Adapted arguments from Plowden and Browne.
1571	Robert Heighington	A Treatise on the Succession (inferred; these unpublished notes were made public by Doleman)	In favour of the line through the House of Portugal. Robert Heighington or Highington of Richmond, Yorkshire was secretary to the Earl of Northumberland. He was indicted for treason and went into exile in the Low Countries after the Rising of the North of 1569, as one of the more prosperous rebels. He supplied maps from 1583 to the Spanish Armada, and was a correspondent of Francis Englefield. He made arguments found in Lesley, adding the precedence of John of Gaunt over Richard II for the succession.

== Later tracts ==
A statute of 1581 forbade in terms publication on, and other discussion of, the succession.

Year	Author	Title	Comment
1580s		Certaine Errours
1584	Anonymous	Leycester's Commonwealth	Known otherwise initially
c.1587	George Puttenham	Justificacion	In a number of manuscripts, it considers the succession position of the 1580s, with attempted objectivity. It defends the execution of Mary Queen of Scots.
1594	R. Doleman (now thought to be a collective pseudonym for a group around Robert Persons, to whom the work was attributed at the time)	A Conference about the Next Succession to the Crowne of Ingland	An analysis of around 14 succession candidates, in terms of five lineages with royal pretensions (including the House of Aviz). This work put into play the succession, by suggesting that elective monarchy, rather than hereditary monarchy, was a more appropriate way to address the succession issue. That approach was rebutted in most of the subsequent tracts.
1598	Alexander Dicsone	Of the Right of the Crowne efter Hir Majesty	Commissioned by James VI, in answer to Doleman, with a related work by Walter Quin. Quin had made an oration on James's claim in 1596; but his book of 1598 on the same topic was refused by the printer, Robert Waldegrave. Edmund Ashfield had prompted James to respond to Doleman, stating that the literature in favour of his mother Mary Queen of Scots was now counter-productive. He urged James to make a case attractive to influential common lawyers. The diplomat George Nicholson described Dicsone reading through Elizabeth's letters to James for arguments. Dicsone's work dealt with the four major points raised against James's claim: (a) Scottish birth; (b) the provisions of the will of Henry VIII; (c) the attainder of Mary, Queen of Scots his mother; (d) his cadet status in the House of Lancaster.
1598	Peter Wentworth, posthumous publication	A Pithie Exhortation	Smuggled out of England, perhaps by David Foulis; printed in Scotland by Robert Waldegrave.
1598	James VI of Scotland	The Trew Law of Free Monarchies	This work, known for its support of the divine right of kings, was also an intervention in the succession debate, through its rejection of the resistance theory in the tract of Doleman, and of the role of parliaments in determining succession.
1598–9	William Watson		Watson claimed to have written a treatise circulated to the Privy Council, the queen and the Earl of Essex, against the Jesuit line on a Spanish succession in Doleman. It favoured the House of York, the claim through the House of Aviz being Lancastrian. Watson was an Appellant in the Archpriest Controversy of these years.
c.1599	Pseudonymous (Don Biud de Haro, translator Harye Bedwod)	Anatomie of Spayne	It was another and painstaking case built up against the Spanish claim. The background to the Spanish original of the Anatomie, translated for Essex (by, it is thought, Arthur Atye), is opaque, but it has been attributed to the Portuguese Dominican José Teixeira in the train of Antonio Pérez.
c.1599	Irenicus Philodikaios	A Treatise	A low-profile printed work supporting James's claim, thought to be by an English writer. The main focus was on Doleman's use of the "Act of Association" (a misnomer). It made play of the misleading application of the Safety of the Queen, etc. Act 1584 to the case of James, given his lack of involvement in subverting Elizabeth.
c.1599	Sir Edmund Ashfield, an agent of James. Possibly therefore Edmund Ashfield. (Details of the name and identification are unclear in the reference; Sir William Eure and Sir Edmund Ashfield were imprisoned in 1601, for communicating with James on the subject of the succession.)		Manuscript addressed to James, analysing social groups in England and how to win them over.
1600	John Colville	Palinod	A retraction by Colville of an earlier work that had denied James's claim, printed by Robert Charteras. Colville had called James a bastard. John Spottiswoode asserted that Colville was not the real author.
1600	Henry Constable	Discoverye of a Counterfecte Conference … for Thadvancement of a Counterfecte Tytle	Published in Paris, though it claimed to be published in Cologne. Against Doleman; Constable was a Catholic convert who supported James's claim.
c.1600	Anonymous	An Apologie of the Scottische King	Against Doleman, and intended for a broad audience, it warned against a disputed succession. Left in manuscript. It has been suggested that the author was a Scot living in England.
1601, then revised	Henry Hooke, later Archdeacon of York.	Of the succession against the Crowne of England	A manuscript eventually submitted to James VI, it was a reply to Doleman that pointed up dangers from Catholics and malcontents.
1602	John Harington	Tract on the Succession to the Crown	Printed 1880, edited by Clements Robert Markham. It makes a case based on the Epistle (1548) of Protector Somerset, Wentworth and Doleman.
1602	Sir Thomas Craig	(in Latin) The Right of Succession to the Kingdom of England	Against Doleman. The work was first published in its English translation by James Gadderar, in 1703.

== Table ==
Claims to the English throne after Elizabeth I

Edward III
John of Gaunt	Edmund of Langley
Philippa of Lancaster	Richard of Conisburgh
Edward, King of Portugal	Richard of York
Ferdinand, Duke of Viseu	Edward IV	George Plantagenet
Manuel I of Portugal	Henry VII	Elizabeth of York	Margaret Pole, Countess of Salisbury
Cognatic claims→
Isabella of Portugal	Henry VIII	Margaret Tudor	Mary Tudor	Henry Pole, 1st Baron Montagu
Suffolk claims
Philip II of Spain (King of England, jure uxoris)	Mary I	Edward VI	Elizabeth I	James V of Scotland	Margaret Douglas	Frances Brandon	Eleanor Clifford	Katherine Pole
Lennox claim
Yorkist claim
Mary, Queen of Scots	Henry Stuart, Lord Darnley	Charles Stuart, Earl of Lennox	Jane Grey	Katherine Grey	Mary Grey	Margaret Stanley ("Margaret Strange")	Henry Hastings, Earl of Huntingdon
Beauchamp claim
Lancastrian claim	Stuart claim	Stuart claim
Isabella Clara Eugenia	James VI and I	Arbella Stuart	Edward Seymour, Lord Beauchamp	Thomas Seymour	Ferdinando Stanley	William Stanley

== See also ==
- List of Jacobean union tracts
