= Andrew Hunter (preacher) =

Andrew Hunter, (d. 1638) Scottish minister and political agent.

Andrew Hunter MA was minister of Carnbee and in 1588 Newburn in Fife. He was supporter of the rebel Francis Stewart, 5th Earl of Bothwell, and became his chaplain, which angered King James VI and he was exiled in May 1594. Henry Lok informed Sir Robert Cecil of his arrival in London in August.

Hunter was an informer for Sir Robert Cecil, offering his opinions on Alexander Dickson, "ane enemie of your stait", and John Wemyss of Logie, "cunning", and sending information on the movements of Jesuits and underground Roman Catholic priests. In July 1598 he was in Edinburgh undergoing questioning about his movements and Logie's confession, which appeared to implicate James VI of Scotland as a covert supporter of Catholic causes.

Hunter wrote from The Hague to Henry Lok and Cecil in November 1598. He mentioned John Young who served Colonel William Stewart and Alexander Dickson, a "professor of the art of memory", formerly supported by the Earl of Leicester, and now an enemy of England.

In August 1599 Hunter was arrested at Great Yarmouth. He was carrying letters from Colonel Edmonds to James VI.

He became a military chaplain to the Scottish regiments fighting for the Dutch Revolt, living at Utrecht and The Hague and attended the Synod of Delft in 1622. He had a large number of children and a small salary.
