= Succession to Elizabeth I =

Political controversy in England (1558–1603)

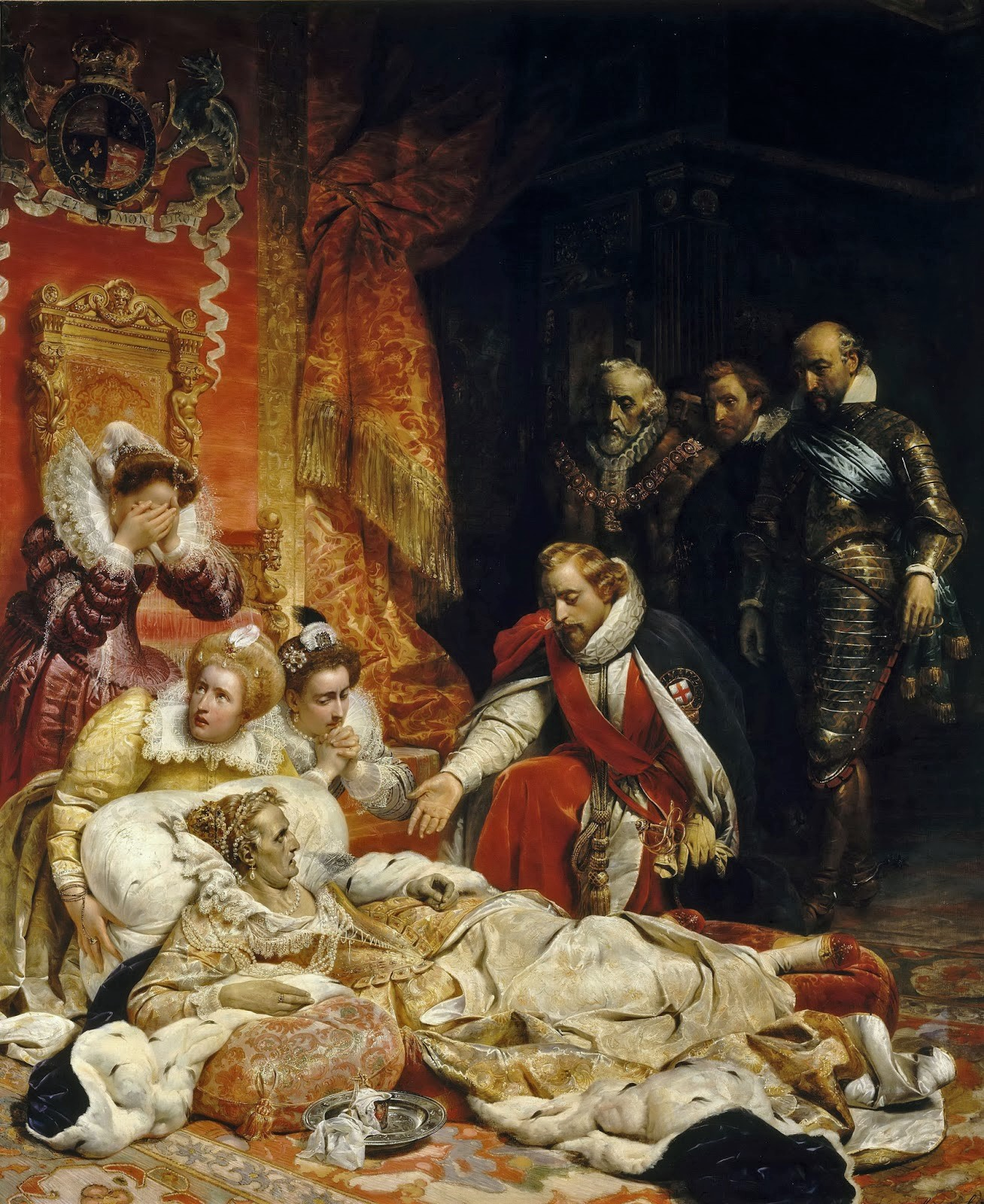
Allegorical painting of the crown passing from Elizabeth I to James I, by Paul Delaroche (1828)

The succession to Elizabeth I, the childless queen of England and Ireland, was an open question from her accession in 1558 to her death in 1603, when the crown passed to James VI of Scotland, an event known as the Union of the Crowns. While the accession of James went smoothly, the succession had been the subject of much debate for decades. In some scholarly views, it was a major political factor of the entire reign, even if not so voiced. Separate aspects have acquired their own nomenclature: the "Norfolk conspiracy", Patrick Collinson's "Elizabethan exclusion crisis", the "Secret Correspondence", and the "Valentine Thomas affair".

The topics of debate remained obscured by uncertainty.

Elizabeth I avoided establishing the order of succession in any form, presumably because she feared for her own life once a successor was named. She was also concerned with England forming a productive relationship with Scotland, whose Catholic and Presbyterian strongholds were resistant to female leadership. Catholic women who would be submissive to the pope and not to English constitutional law were rejected.

== Henry VIII's will ==
The will of Elizabeth's father, Henry VIII, had named one male and six females living at his death in 1547 as the line of succession:

(1) his son Edward (who would reign as Edward VI),
(2) Henry's oldest child and elder daughter Mary (who would reign as Mary I),
(3) his youngest child and younger daughter Elizabeth (who would reign as Elizabeth I);
and then four of his sister Mary Tudor's granddaughters:

(4) Jane Grey,
(5) Katherine Grey,
(6) Mary Grey, and
(7) Margaret Clifford.

By 1596, however, Elizabeth was the only one still alive.

Some contemporary authorities considered that the legal position hinged on documents such as the statute De natis ultra mare of Edward III, and the will of Henry VIII. There were different opinions about the application of these documents. Political, religious and military matters came to predominate later in Elizabeth's reign, in the context of the Anglo-Spanish War.

== Family tree of claims ==
Claims to the English throne after Elizabeth I
(see also List of Elizabethan succession tracts)

Edward III
John of Gaunt	Edmund of Langley
Philippa of Lancaster	John Beaufort (Earl)	Richard of Conisburgh
Edward, King of Portugal	John Beaufort (Duke)	Richard of York
Ferdinand, Duke of Viseu	Margaret Beaufort	Edward IV	George Plantagenet
Manuel I of Portugal	Henry VII	Elizabeth of York	Margaret Pole
Cognatic claims→
Isabella of Portugal	Henry VIII	Margaret Tudor	James IV of Scotland	Mary Tudor	Henry Pole
Suffolk claims
Philip II of Spain	Mary I	Elizabeth I	Edward VI	James V of Scotland	Margaret Douglas	Frances Brandon	Eleanor Clifford	Catherine Pole
Lennox claim
Yorkist claim
Mary, Queen of Scots	Henry Stuart	Charles Stuart	Jane Grey	Katherine Grey	Mary Grey	Margaret Stanley	Henry Hastings
Beauchamp claim
Lancastrian claim	Stuart claim	Stuart claim
Isabella Clara Eugenia	James VI and I	Arbella Stuart	Edward Seymour	Thomas Seymour	Ferdinando Stanley	William Stanley

== Cognatic descent from Henry VII ==
Descent from the two daughters of Henry VII who reached adulthood, Margaret and Mary, was the first and main issue in the succession.

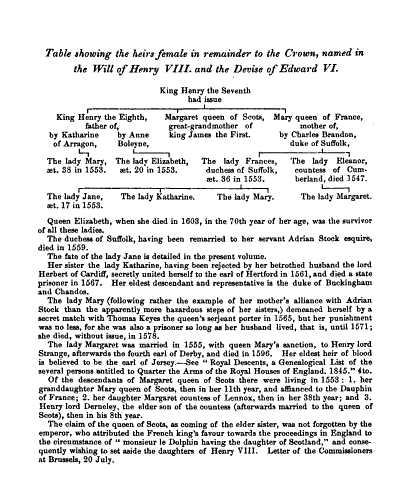
Partial explanation of the descendants of Mary Tudor

=== Lennox claim ===
Mary I of England had died without managing to have her preferred successor and first cousin, Margaret Douglas, Countess of Lennox, nominated by parliament. Margaret Douglas was a daughter of Margaret Tudor, and lived to 1578, but became a marginal figure in discussions of the succession to Elizabeth I, who at no point clarified the dynastic issues of the Tudor line. When in 1565 Margaret Douglas's elder son Henry Stuart, Lord Darnley, married Mary, Queen of Scots, the "Lennox claim" was generally regarded as consolidated into the "Stuart claim".

=== Stuart claimants ===
James VI was the son of two grandchildren of Margaret Tudor. Arbella Stuart, the most serious other contender by the late 16th century, was the daughter of Margaret Douglas, Countess of Lennox's younger son Charles Stuart, 1st Earl of Lennox.

James VI's mother, Mary, Queen of Scots, was considered a plausible successor to the English throne. At the beginning of Elizabeth's reign she sent ambassadors to England when a parliament was summoned, anticipating a role for parliament in settling the succession in her favour. Mary was a Roman Catholic, and her proximity to the succession was a factor in plotting, including the Throckmorton Plot and the Babington Plot, making her position a political problem for the English government, eventually resolved by judicial means. She was convicted of plotting to assassinate Elizabeth and was executed in 1587. In that year, Mary's son James reached the age of twenty-one, while Arbella was only twelve.

=== Suffolk claimants ===
While the Stuart line of James and Arbella would have had political support, by 1600 the descendants of Mary Tudor were theoretically relevant, and on legal grounds could not be discounted. Frances Grey, Duchess of Suffolk, and Eleanor Clifford, Countess of Cumberland, both had children who were in the line of succession. Frances and Eleanor were Mary Tudor's daughters by her second husband, Charles Brandon, 1st Duke of Suffolk. Frances married Henry Grey, Duke of Suffolk, and they had three daughters, Jane, Catherine, and Mary. Of these, the two youngest lived into Queen Elizabeth's reign.

Catherine's first marriage to the youthful Henry Herbert, 2nd Earl of Pembroke, a political match, was annulled, and there were no children. She married Edward Seymour, 1st Earl of Hertford covertly in 1560. The couple were separately imprisoned in the Tower of London after Catherine became pregnant. There were two sons of the marriage, but both were decided by the established Church of England to be illegitimate. After Catherine's death in 1568, Seymour was released. The elder boy became Edward Seymour, Viscount Beauchamp; the younger was named Thomas. The "Beauchamp claim" was more insistently kept up by Thomas, relying on a defence against the ruling of illegitimacy available to him, but not to his elder brother. He died in 1600. Rumours after Elizabeth's death showed that the Beauchamp claim was not forgotten.

Mary Grey married, without royal permission, Thomas Keyes, and had no sons. She completely lacked interest in royal pretensions.

The family of Eleanor Clifford was more often talked of in relation to the succession. A daughter Margaret Stanley, Countess of Derby lived to have two sons, Ferdinando Stanley, 5th Earl of Derby and William Stanley, 6th Earl of Derby. At the period when Margaret Stanley might have been considered a succession candidate, her name was usually "Margaret Strange", based on her husband's courtesy title of Lord Strange. Her Catholic support was drawn off by the Stuart claim. Just before his death in 1593, however, the claim of her husband Henry Stanley, 4th Earl of Derby was being promoted by Sir William Stanley and William Allen.

Ferdinando's position in the succession then led to his being approached in the superficial Hesketh plot to seize power, in September 1593. His daughter Anne Stanley, Countess of Castlehaven, played a part in the legalistic and hypothetical discussions of the succession.

== Yorkist claimant ==
There was some interest early in the reign of Queen Elizabeth in a claimant from the House of York. Henry Hastings, 3rd Earl of Huntingdon, could make a claim only based on the idea that Henry VII was a usurper, rather than a legitimate king, but he had some supporters, ahead of the Tudor, Stuart and Suffolk lines. Margaret Pole, Countess of Salisbury, a survivor of the Plantagenets, was his great-grandmother (on his mother's side), and her paternal grandfather was Richard, Duke of York. The Spanish diplomat Álvaro de la Quadra, on whose accounts the early intrigues round the succession have been reconstructed, considered that Robert Dudley, brother-in-law to Hastings, was pushing the Queen in March 1560 to make Hastings her successor, against his wishes. There were also some pretensions from his relations in the Pole family.

== Lancastrian claim through John of Gaunt ==
The major political issue of the reign of Richard II of England, that his uncle, the magnate John of Gaunt, would claim the throne and so overturn the principle of primogeniture, was revived in the context of the Elizabethan succession, after seven generations. John of Gaunt's eldest daughter having married into the Portuguese House of Aviz, one of his descendants was the Infanta of Spain, Isabella Clara Eugenia. The legitimacy of Isabella's claim was seriously put forward, on the Catholic side of the argument. A reason given for Essex's Rebellion was that the Infanta's claim had gained traction with Elizabeth and her counsellors.

== Succession Act of 1543 ==
The Succession to the Crown Act 1543 was the third such act of the reign of Henry VIII. It endorsed the provisions of Henry's last will (whatever they were) in assigning the order of succession, after Elizabeth's death. It in consequence supported in parliamentary terms the succession claims of Lady Catherine Grey, Protestant and born in England, over those of Mary, Queen of Scots. Further, it meant that the Stuart claimants were disadvantaged, compared to the Suffolk claimants, though James VI was descended from the older daughter of Henry VII.

Setting aside the will would have, in fact, threatened the prospects of James VI, by opening up a fresh legal front. It indeed specified the preference for descendants of Mary, rather than Margaret. However, in its absence, the matter of the succession could not be handled as an issue under statute law. If it were left to the common law, the question of how James, an alien, could inherit could be raised in a more serious form.

There was no comparable Act of Parliament in Elizabeth's time. She did not follow the precedent set by her father in allowing parliamentary debate on the subject of the succession but instead actively tried to close it down throughout her reign. Paul Wentworth explicitly challenged her position on the matter in questions put to the House of Commons in 1566.

In 1563, William Cecil drafted a bill envisaging the Privy Council having wide powers if the Queen died without an heir, but he did not put it forward. Parliament petitioned the Queen to name her successor, but she did not do so. A Bill was passed by Parliament in 1572, but the Queen refused her assent. In the early 1590s, Peter Wentworth attempted to bring up the question again, but debate was shut down sharply. The matter surfaced mainly in drama.

== Succession tracts ==
Discussion of the succession was strongly discouraged and became dangerous, but it was not entirely suppressed. During the last two decades of the century, the Privy Council was active against pamphlets and privately circulated literature on the topic. John Stubbs, who published on the closely related issue of the queen's marriage, avoided execution in 1579 but had a hand cut off and was in the Tower of London until 1581. In that year, Parliament passed the Act against Seditious Words and Rumours Uttered against the Queen's Most Excellent Majesty. The publication of books deemed seditious became a felony.

Much of the writing was therefore anonymous; in manuscript form or, in the case of Catholic arguments, smuggled into the country. Some was published in Scotland. Leicester's Commonwealth (1584), for example, an illegally circulated tract attacking the queen's favourite Robert Dudley, Earl of Leicester, devoted much of its space to arguing for the succession rights of Mary, Queen of Scots.

A number of treatises, or "succession tracts", circulated. Out of a large literature on the question, the 19th century librarian Edward Edwards picked five of the tracts that were major contributions. That by Hales reflected a Puritan view (it has been taken to be derived from John Ponet); and it to a large extent set the terms of the later debate. The other four developed the cases for Catholic successors.

=== The Hales tract ===
John Hales wrote a speech to give in the House of Commons in 1563; he was a partisan of the Earl of Hertford, in right of his wife, the former Lady Catherine Grey. It was related to the efforts of Lord John Grey, Lady Catherine Grey's uncle and guardian, who tried to make the case that she was the royal heir at an early point in Elizabeth's reign, incurring the Queen's wrath. This manuscript brought to bear on the question the old statute De natis ultra mare. It was influential in the following debate, but the interpretation of the statute became important. It also caused a furore, and allegations of a plot. Hales could only be brought to say that he had shown a draft to John Grey, William Fleetwood, the other member of parliament for the same borough, and John Foster, who had been one of the members for Hindon. Walter Haddon called Hales's arrest and the subsequent row the Tempestas Halesiana. What Hales was doing was quite complex, using legal arguments to rule out Scottish claimants, and also relying on research abroad by Robert Beale to reopen the matter of the Hertford marriage. Francis Newdigate, who had married Anne Seymour, Duchess of Somerset, was involved in the investigation, but was not imprisoned; Hales was. He spent a year in the Fleet Prison and the Tower of London, and for the rest of his life was under house arrest.

=== The case for a Catholic successor ===
==== Early tracts ====
John Lesley wrote on behalf of Mary, Queen of Scots. A defence of the honour of the right high, mightye and noble Princess Marie (1569) had its London printing prevented by Lord Burghley. It raised, in particular, the tensions between the Succession to the Crown Act 1543 and the actual wills left by Henry VIII. Elizabeth would not accept the implied degree of parliamentary control of the succession. Further discussion of the succession was prohibited by statute, from 1571. A related work, by Thomas Morgan (as supposed), or Morgan Philipps (supposed), for Mary, Queen of Scots, was another printing of Lesley's work, in 1571. Lesley's arguments in fact went back to Edmund Plowden, and had been simplified by Anthony Browne.

=== The Doleman tract ===
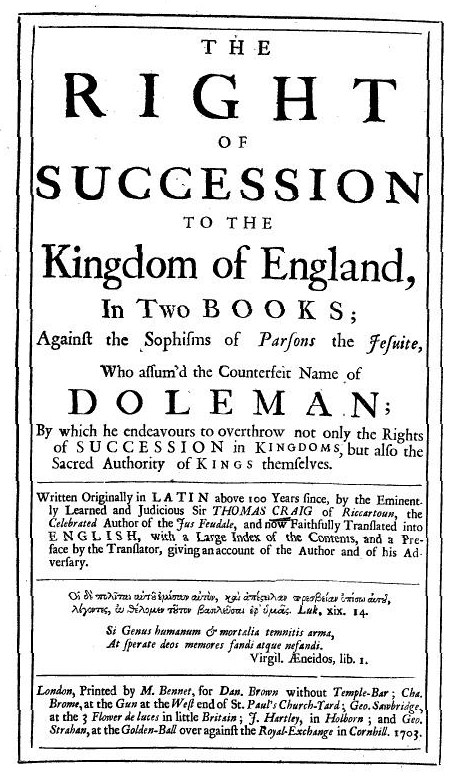
Title page from 1703, English translation of a Latin work of Sir Thomas Craig, a reply to the Conference about the next Succession to the Crown of England (1595) of Robert Persons on the succession to Elizabeth I

The arguments naturally changed after Queen Mary's execution. It has been noted that Protestant supporters of James VI took over debating points previously used by her supporters, while Catholics employed some arguments that had been employed by Protestants.

A significant step was taken in Robert Highington's Treatise on the Succession, in favour of the line through the House of Portugal. Robert Persons's pseudonymous Conference about the next Succession to the Crown of England, by R. Doleman (comprising perhaps co-authors, 1595), was against the claim of James VI. It cited Highington's arguments, against those of Hales and Sir Nicholas Bacon. This work made an apparent effort to discuss candidates equitably, including the Infanta of Spain, Isabella Clara Eugenia. It was taken by some in England to imply that Elizabeth's death could lead to civil war. A preface suggested that Robert Devereux, 2nd Earl of Essex might be a decisive influence. The circumstance reflected badly on Essex with the Queen. It also sought to undermine Burghley by suggesting he was a partisan of Arbella Stuart, and dealt acutely with the Lancaster/York issues.

== Other literature ==
The plot of Gorboduc (1561) has often been seen as a contribution to the succession debate. This view, as expounded by Marie Axton, has led to much further debate. The play was given for the queen in 1562, and later published. Stephen Alford argues that it is a generalised "succession text", with themes of bad counsel and civil war. From the point of view of Elizabethan and Jacobean literary criticism, it has been argued that it is significant to know when the succession was "live" as an issue of public concern, right into the reign of James I, and in what form drama, in particular, might be expressing comment on it. In particular, Hopkins points out that Macbeth and King Lear, both relating to legitimacy and dynastic politics, were written in the early years of James's reign.

The term "succession play" is now widely applied to dramas of the period that relate to a royal succession. Plays mentioned in this way include, among other works by Shakespeare, Hamlet; Henry V; A Midsummer Night's Dream through allegory and the figure of Titania; and Richard II as an atypical case. Another, later play that might be read in this way is Perkin Warbeck (1634) by John Ford.

The poet Michael Drayton alluded to the succession in Englands Heroicall Epistles (1597), in a way now seen as heavy-handed dabbling in politics. In it, imaginary letters in couplets are exchanged by paired historical characters. Hopkins sees the work as a "genealogical chain" leading up to the succession issue, and points out the detailed discussion of the Yorkist claim, in the annotations to the epistles between Margaret of Anjou and William de la Pole, 1st Duke of Suffolk (thought in Drayton's time to have been lovers).

== Position at the end of the century ==
Theories on the putative succession had to be revised constantly from the later 1590s. The speculations were wide, and the cast of characters changed their status.

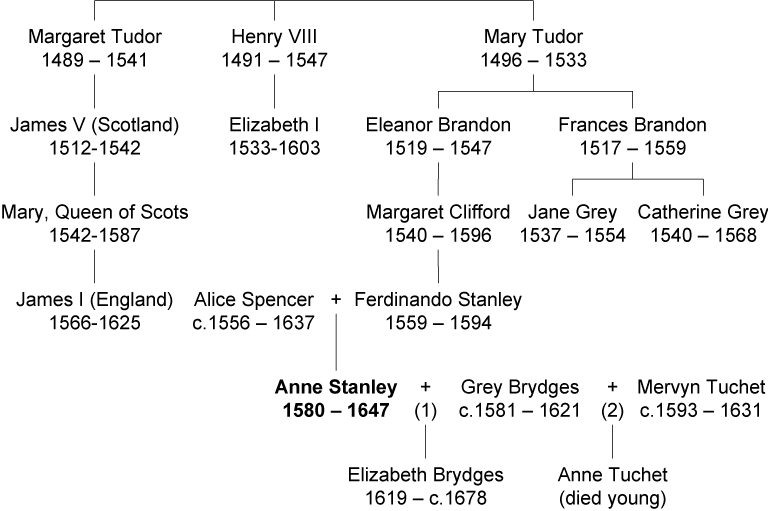
Anne Stanley in genealogical context

The Doleman tract of 1594 suggested one resolution to the succession issue: the Suffolk claimant William Stanley, 6th Earl of Derby should marry the Infanta of Spain, and succeed. Stanley, however, married the following year. Duke Charles Emmanuel I of Savoy, son-in-law of Philip II of Spain, became a widower in 1597. Catholic opinion suggested he might marry a female claimant, Lady Anne Stanley (the Earl's niece), if not Arbella Stuart.

Thomas Wilson wrote in a report The State of England, Anno Domini 1600 that there were 12 "competitors" for the succession. His counting included two Stuarts (James and Arbella), three of the Suffolks (two Beauchamp claimants and the Earl of Derby), and George Hastings, 4th Earl of Huntingdon, younger brother of the 3rd Earl mentioned above. The other six were:

- Charles Neville, 6th Earl of Westmorland via John of Gaunt (Note: Westmorland's claim would be based upon primogeniture descent from the House of Lancaster. He was descended from Elizabeth, second eldest daughter of John of Gaunt. The Portuguese royal family, who was descended from Gaunt's eldest daughter Philippa, would have to be ignored.)
- Henry Percy, 9th Earl of Northumberland via Edmund Crouchback
- António, Prior of Crato, nephew of Henry, King of Portugal, via John of Gaunt; (Note: Another potential Lancastrian claimant, he had senior descent by primogeniture from John of Gaunt by Philippa of Lancaster. He was illegitimate, however, placing the Duke of Parma as next in line.) and with related claims
- Ranuccio I Farnese, Duke of Parma (Note: Farnese's claim would be made by standard primogeniture descent from John of Gaunt, through the latter's eldest daughter Philippa.)
- Philip III of Spain
- The Infanta of Spain.

These six may have all been taken as the Catholic candidates (Percy was not in fact a Catholic, though from a Catholic family). Wilson at the time of writing (about 1601) had been working on intelligence matters for Lord Buckhurst and Sir Robert Cecil.

Of these supposed claimants, Thomas Seymour and Charles Neville died in 1600. None of the Iberian claims came to anything. The Duke of Parma was the subject of the same speculations as the Duke of Savoy; but he married in 1600. Arbella Stuart was in the care of Bess of Hardwick, and Edward Seymour in the care of Richard Knightley, whose second wife Elizabeth was one of his sisters.

== See also ==
- Alternative successions of the English crown
