= Leicester's Commonwealth =

1584 work attacking Robert Dudley

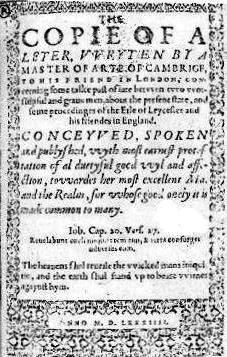
A printed copy of the original edition of Leicester's Commonwealth

Leicester's Commonwealth (originally titled The Copie of a Leter wryten by a Master of Arts of Cambrige) (1584) is a scurrilous book that circulated in Elizabethan England and attacked Queen Elizabeth I's favourite, Robert Dudley, Earl of Leicester. The work was read as Roman Catholic propaganda against the political and religious policy of Elizabeth I's regime, particularly the Puritan sympathies fostered by Leicester. In doing so, it portrayed Leicester as an amoral opportunist of "almost satanic malevolence" and circulated lurid stories of his supposed scandalous deeds and dangerous plots.

The text is presented as "a letter written by a Master of Art of Cambridge to his friend in London, concerning some talk passed of late between two worshipful and grave men about the present state and some proceedings of the Earl of Leicester and his friends in England". The title Leicester's Commonwealth was first used in the 1641 edition. The book significantly influenced Leicester's historical reputation in the ensuing centuries.

== Content ==
The book takes the form of a dialogue between a Cambridge scholar, a lawyer and a gentleman. It begins as a plea for religious toleration by asserting that Catholics who are loyal to the Queen and country should be free to profess their religion. The lawyer, who professes to be a moderate "papist", expresses the view that religious differences do not undermine the patriotism of citizens and gives examples of religiously divided populations that have united to defend their country against external enemies.

The text quickly veers into an attack on the Earl of Leicester by making all kinds of accusations against him, most notably a number of murders. His first is that of his wife, Amy Robsart, who according to the tract was found at the bottom of a short flight of stairs with a broken neck, her headdress still standing undisturbed "upon her head". Leicester's hired assassin later confesses on his death bed while "all the devils in hell" tear him into pieces. Meanwhile, the assassin's servant, who witnessed the deed, has already been dispatched in prison by Leicester's agents before he could tell the story. With the expert help of his Italian physician, Dr. Giulio, Leicester goes on to remove the husbands of his lovers Douglas, Lady Sheffield and Lettice, Countess of Essex (ladies referred to as "his Old and his New Testaments"), including John Sheffield, 2nd Baron Sheffield. The Cardinal of Chatillon, Nicholas Throckmorton, Lady Margaret Lennox, and the Earl of Sussex are dispatched in the same manner, by poison. After the murder of Walter Devereux, 1st Earl of Essex, Leicester pays Francis Drake to kill Thomas Doughty, who knows too much about the situation (Doughty had been executed by Drake for mutiny at sea).

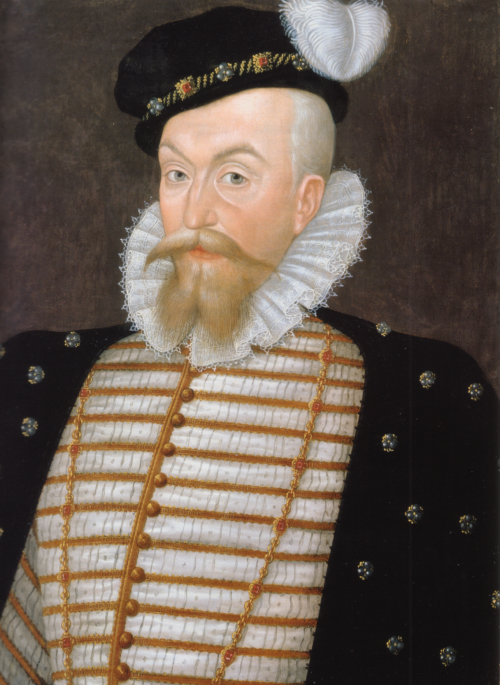
Robert Dudley, Earl of Leicester, the villain of the piece

The work also reveals Leicester's monstrous sexual appetite and his and his new wife's lewd private lives, including abortions, illnesses and other shortcomings. The death of their little son, which occurred shortly before the book's publication, is commented on with a biblical allusion in a stop press marginal note: "The children of adulterers shall be consumed, and the seed of a wicked bed shall be rooted out".

A born traitor in the third generation who has "nothing of his own, either of his ancestors, or of himself", Leicester is also accused of systematically despoiling the lands the queen has granted him and of ruthlessly extorting money from those in his power. The mathematician Thomas Allen is said to be employing the art of "figuring" to further Leicester's unlawful designs and of having endeavoured to bring about a match between his patron and Queen Elizabeth by black magic. Leicester, a "perpetuall dictator" who hates and terrorises the helpless Queen, is to blame that England has no heir of Elizabeth's body since he has prevented her marriage to a foreign prince by falsely claiming to be engaged to her and showing her suitors' ambassadors "a most disloyal proof" thereof. Having failed to attain the supreme power through marriage, he has no religion himself but is building up a party of misled Puritans to assist him in dethroning Elizabeth in favour of his brother-in-law, the Earl of Huntingdon. He will then get rid of Huntingdon and place the crown on his own head. Leicester's immediate arrest and execution are recommended as the most beneficial act that the Queen could ever do to her country.

As the book progresses, it increasingly becomes a defense of Mary Stuart's succession rights, which by 1584 had become imperilled by her involvement in several plots to assassinate Elizabeth.

== Authorship ==
The authorship of the pamphlet has been much disputed. Francis Walsingham, in charge of Elizabeth's secret service, thought that Thomas Morgan, the exiled agent of Mary Stuart, to be its author when it first surfaced in August 1584. Dudley likewise believed that Mary was involved in its conception: "Leicester has lately told a friend that he will persecute you to the uttermost", one of her spies informed her. The Jesuit Robert Persons soon became popularly associated with it, which was published under his name in later editions. Although he denied authorship in his memoirs, he was involved in smuggling the book from France to England. Scholars now generally believe that Persons was not the author. Ralph Emerson, a Catholic activist, was arrested in possession of several copies but could not or would not identify the author when questioned.

Some modern scholars have suggested that there was no single author and that several members of the exiled Catholic community based in France wrote the text as a group effort, the chief candidates being Charles Arundell and Charles Paget. The original intention of the text is probably linked to a factional struggle at the French court. It favoured the party of the Guises, supporters of the Catholic League, against those with a more positive attitude to Elizabeth and England.

== Suppression ==
The work was welcomed by exiled Catholics as the best weapon that they had. Francis Englefield, who served Philip II of Spain, wrote on hearing of it: "Instead of the sword which we cannot obtain, we must fight with prayer and pen". Those kinds of books, he thought, "ought to be to this Queen of England's annoyance... who I hope shall have a fall at last".

Elizabeth's government made considerable efforts to suppress the work, but according to D. C. Peck, "from the evidence of the book's circulation and its later effects, however, the government's attempts at suppression must be said largely to have failed". The Queen published an official condemnation of the libel: "Her majesty [testifieth] in her conscience, before God, unto you, that her Highness not only knoweth in assured certainty, the libels and books against the said Earl, to be most malicious, false and slanderous, and such as none but the devil himself could deem to be true". She offered an amnesty for anyone who handed in the book but threatened imprisonment for those found with it in their possession. Attempts to identify and suppress printing of it in France were unsuccessful, but imported copies were seized and Elizabeth managed to get King James VI of Scotland to impound copies. Nevertheless, handcopied versions of the book circulated widely.

Sir Philip Sidney wrote a defence of his uncle against the attacks in Leicester's Commonwealth and dismissed most of the charges as alehouse talk but instead concentrated on defending the noble lineage and character of his grandfather John Dudley, Duke of Northumberland and even rhetorically challenged the author to a duel. However, Sidney's reply remained unpublished. The work was eventually printed in Collins's "Sydney Papers" in 1746.

The book highly influenced Leicester's historical reputation, as later writers, from William Camden onward, relied heavily on it. It thus laid the foundation of a historiographical tradition that depicted him as the classical Machiavellian courtier and as the evil spirit of Elizabeth's court.
