= John Hales (died 1572) =

English politician

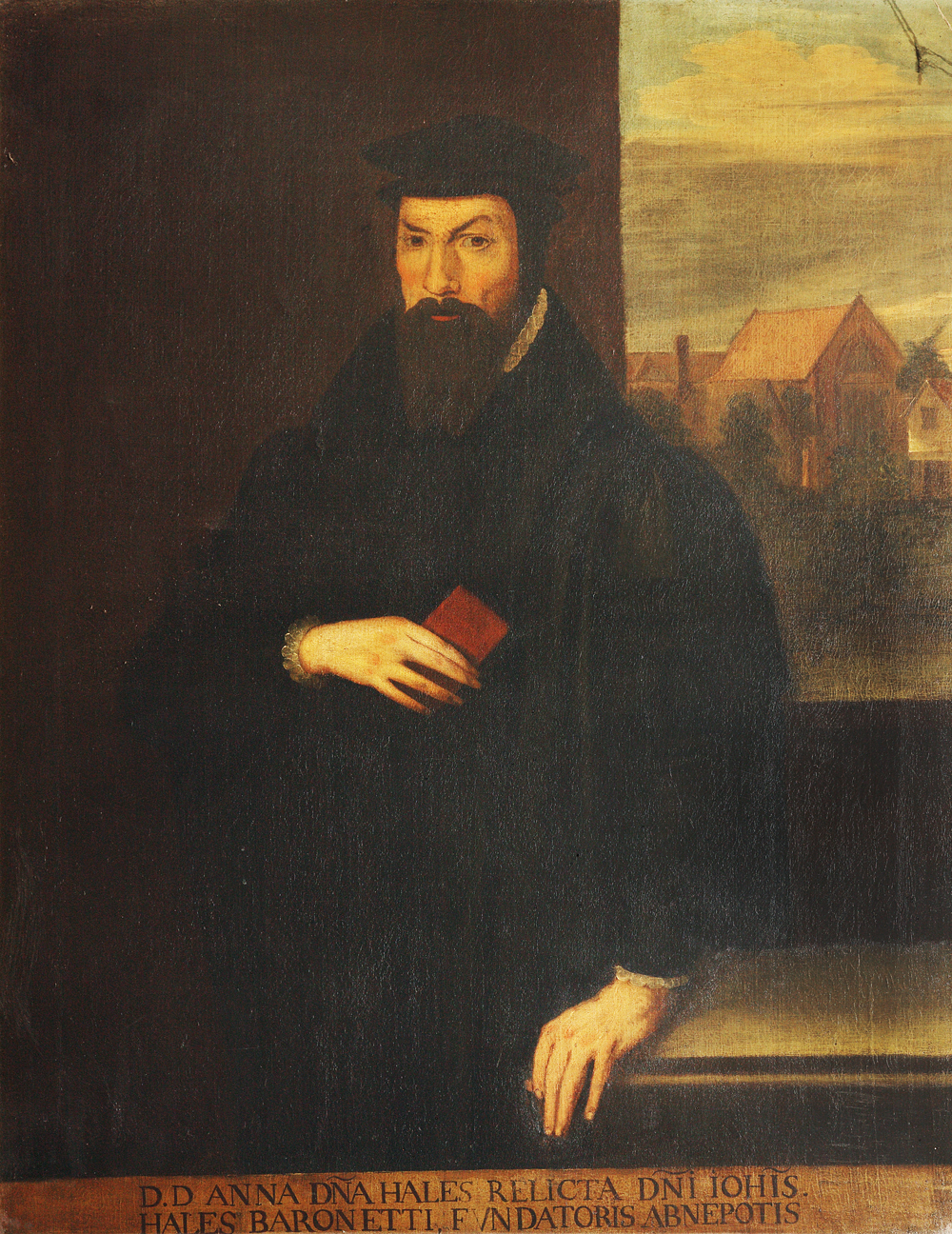
- late 16th C–early 17th C
- Born: c.1516
- Died: 26 or 28 December 1572
- Parent: Thomas Hales

John Hales (c. 1516 – 26 or 28 December 1572) was a writer, administrator, and member of parliament during the Tudor period.

== Family ==
John Hales was the son of Thomas Hales of Hales Place, Halden, Kent, and of 'the daughter of Trefoy of the county of Cornwall'. He had four brothers and a sister:

- John Hales, who died without issue.
- Christopher Hales, of Coventry, who married Mary Lucy, the daughter of William Lucy, esquire, and Anne Fermor, and sister of Sir Thomas Lucy of Charlecote, Warwickshire.
- Bartholomew Hales (died 1599), esquire, of Snitterfield, Warwickshire, who married Mary Harper, the daughter of George Harper (died 12 December 1558) by his first wife, Lucy Peckham (d. 31 July 1552), daughter of Thomas Peckham.
- Stephen Hales (d. 27 March 1574), esquire, of Newland and Exhall, Warwickshire, freeman of the Merchant Taylors' Company in 1552, Warden in 1557, 1564 and 1565, and one of the four founders of the Merchant Taylors' School, who married firstly Amy Morison, the daughter of Thomas Morison of Chardwell, Yorkshire, and sister of Sir Richard Morison, and secondly, before 1561, Bridget Over, widow of John Nethermill, and daughter of Henry Over, who survived him.
- Mildred Hales (died 1596) who married Thomas Docwra (died 1602) of Putteridge in Offley, Hertfordshire; their son, Thomas Docwra, married Jane Peryam, the daughter of Sir William Peryam.

== Under Henry VIII ==
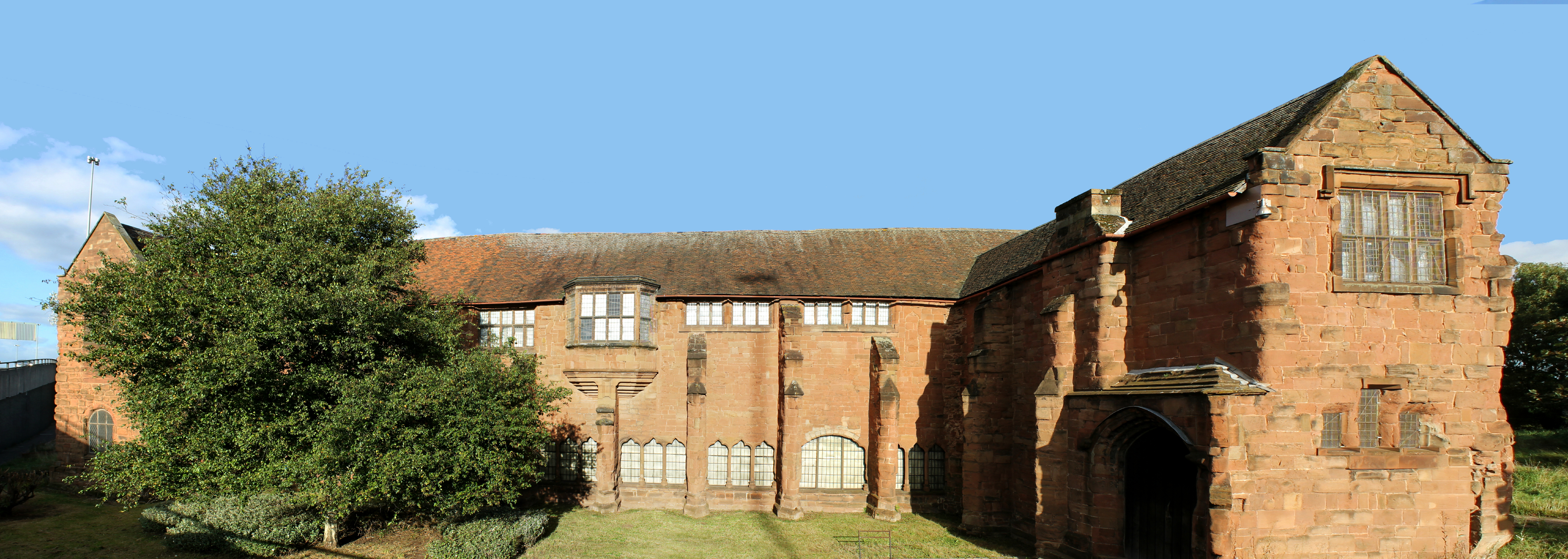
John Hales' former residence, the Whitefriars, Coventry, as it is today

According to Lowe, Hales may have spent some time at Oxford, but 'was largely a self-taught scholar of Greek, Latin, Hebrew, and the law'. He spent his early years in the household of Sir Christopher Hales, Attorney General and Master of the Rolls, and after nine years' service there, was dismissed after having expressed a wish to leave his employment. By 1535 he was in the service of Thomas Cromwell. In 1537 he was appointed clerk to Sir John Gostwick in the office of First Fruits and Tenths, and by 1541 had become deputy to the Clerk of the Hanaper, Sir Ralph Sadler. In 1545 Hales and Sadler were granted a joint patent for the office. According to Bindoff, the records show that Hales 'bore the brunt of the work' at the Hanaper, and in addition assisted Sadler with his duties as Master of the Great Wardrobe.

On 6 June 1540, during the Dissolution of the Monasteries, Hales purchased from Sir Richard Morison the former Priory of St Mary Without Bishopsgate in London for £500, and on 16 December 1544 purchased from Sir Ralph Sadler the former monastery of the Whitefriars in Coventry for £83 12s 6d. Hales converted part of the Whitefriars into a residence, Hales Place, and set up a free grammar school in what had been the choir. In 1545 he was granted licence to establish the free school as King Henry VIII School in the former St John's Hospital in Coventry. Hales provided lands valued at 200 marks for the school's maintenance.

== Under Edward VI ==
When King Edward VI came to the throne in 1547, Hales was appointed a Justice of the Peace for Middlesex and Warwickshire, and became a member of parliament for Preston, Lancashire.

Hales supported the economic policies pursued by the young King's uncle, Protector Somerset. Hales was particularly opposed to the enclosure of land, and is said to have been the most active of the commissioners appointed in 1548 to redress this evil. However he failed to carry several remedial measures through Parliament. When Somerset fell from power in October 1549, Hales was imprisoned in the Tower, likely as a result of his support for Somerset's policies. He was released in 1550, and after enfeoffing his lands to his brother, Stephen, and to Sir Ralph Sadler, obtained licence on 2 February 1551 to leave England in the company of Sir Richard Morison, who was being sent as ambassador to Holy Roman Emperor Charles V.

== Marian exile ==
Hales lived in Germany with his brother, Christopher, principally at Frankfurt, until Queen Elizabeth I came to the throne. While there he formed a friendship with the scholar Sturmius.

== Under Elizabeth I ==
Hales was back in England by 3 January 1559, and resumed his former position at the Hanaper. He was one of the Members of Parliament for Lancaster from 1563 to 1567.

Hales lost royal favour, however, by writing a succession tract entitled A Declaration of the Succession of the Crowne Imperiall of Inglande, supporting the title to the crown of the descendants of King Henry VIII's younger sister Mary. Mary's granddaughter Lady Catherine Grey had secretly married Edward Seymour, and the Queen had had them both imprisoned. Hales took the position that if the Queen were to have no children, Lady Catherine should be next in line to the throne. Hales was imprisoned for his temerity. On 27 April 1564 Sir William Cecil wrote to Sir Thomas Smith that:

Here is fallen out a troublesome fond matter. John Hales had secretly made a book in the time of the last Parliament wherein he hath taken upon him to discuss no small matter, viz., the title to the Crown after the Queen’s Majesty, having confuted and rejected the line of the Scottish Queen, and made the line of the Lady Frances, mother to the Lady Catherine, only next and lawful. He is committed to the Fleet for this boldness, specially because he had communicated it to sundry persons. My Lord John Grey is in trouble also for it. Beside this, John Hales hath procured sentences and counsels of lawyers from beyond seas to be written in maintenance of the Earl of Hertford’s marriage. This dealing of his offendeth the Queen’s Majesty very much.

With Cecil's help Hales obtained his release from prison in 1566, but remained under house arrest for the next four years.

== Death ==
The date of Hales's death is uncertain. According to Bindoff, he died on 26 December 1572, while according to Lowe, he died two days later on 28 December. He was buried in the Church of St Peter le Poer in Broad Street, London. He was sometimes referred to as "Club-foot" Hales, supposedly because he had accidentally wounded his foot with a dagger.

== Works ==
Hales wrote his Highway to Nobility about 1543. He wrote Introductiones ad grammaticum for his newly founded free school. In 1543 he also published Precepts for the Preservation of Health, a translation from Plutarch.

Hales was long thought to be the author of the anonymous tract The Discourse of the Common Weal of this Realm of England (1581), but it was subsequently shown to be by Thomas Smith.

== Heir ==
Hales had never married and left most of his property to his nephew John Hales, a son of his brother Christopher Hales by his brother's marriage to Mary Lucy.

== Notes ==
Attribution
