= George Nicholson (diplomat) =

Former English diplomat in Scotland

George Nicholson or Nicolson (floruit 1577–1612), was an English diplomat in Scotland.

== Resident in Scotland ==
George Nicholson was not an ambassador in Scotland but a resident agent. He had been a servant of Robert Bowes for many years. Nicholson, Christopher Shepherdson, and William Wood were mentioned as servants of Bowes in the will of Isotta de Canonici, the wife of the Italian writer Giacomo Castelvetro, who died in Edinburgh in 1594.

Bowes became unwell in 1597 and intended Nicholson should take his place. On 6 December 1597 Queen Elizabeth of England wrote a letter of accreditation for Nicholson as the English resident, to be delivered to King James VI of Scotland. Nicholson was to get 13s-4d per day and the help of the Governor of Berwick-upon-Tweed to convey his letters. His couriers included Jarret Storrie, a member of the Berwick garrison.

Nicholson was soon treated as an ambassador in all but name. Most of his letters were sent to the Secretary, Sir Robert Cecil. Cecil kept a catalogue of his "intelligencers", a list of its contents show that details on Nicholson appeared on folio number 32.

His network of contacts at the Scottish court built on the organisation built by Bowes and the English courtier Roger Aston, and he came treat James VI in a familiar way. Nicholson played cards with James VI at Falkland Palace in May 1602. Cecil from time to time reminded him of his low status as a resident agent, rather than an ambassador, a representative of a monarch and usually a member of the aristocracy. Nicholson may have been insensitive, or lacked some tact, notably he came to Dunfermline seeking an audience with the king on 3 June 1602 while the court was in mourning for the death of the infant Duke Robert. The Treasurer, Sir George Home sent him away.

To help keep track of Scottish families and factions, Bowes kept a chest in his Edinburgh lodging which contained copies of the family trees of the Scottish nobility. Nicholson made copies of these for Burghley in England as required. Bowes' wife Eleanor Musgrave had the key of the chest. A Scottish armorial manuscript now held at Lambeth Palace library which dates from 1594 was probably part of this collection.

== Scottish affairs ==
Nicholson reported on Anne of Denmark's dislike of George Home in 1592. Robert Carr, the future Earl of Somerset, served as Home's page, and it has been suggested that this was the origin of Anne's later enmity with Somerset.

Robert Bowes sent him to William Cecil in October 1593 with a list of instructions about Scottish politics, and if he should intercede with James VI for Francis Stewart, 5th Earl of Bothwell, and whether he should ignore Lord Home's interference with his letters, and also about Bowe's potential return to England and replacement, and his debts.

Nicholson, Roger Aston, and John Colville all wrote to Bowes in March 1595 about the arrival of James Myreton, a Jesuit priest, and brother of the Laird of Cambo. He was detained at Leith by David Lindsay, and when brought to the king he said he was sent from the Pope and a Cardinal. He brought a jewel from the Cardinal to wear on a chain that depicted the Crucifixion made of gold, crystal, and bone. James VI gave the jewel to Anne of Denmark.

In August 1595 Nicholson rode to Loch Lomond and the castle on Inchmurrin with Elizabeth's letters for James VI, where the king often went on annual hunting trips. Sir George Home told him to note that the king received Lachlan Mor Maclean to his favour. MacLean and the Earl of Argyll went hunting with the king at a "mean house" belonging to Argyll.

In September 1595 he went to Falkland Palace where he observed at first hand the feud between Anne of Denmark and the Earl of Mar, who was the keeper of her son, Prince Henry. The queen would not look to that side of the chamber where the Earl stood. She said she would not go to Stirling for fear they would give her a poisoned posset, despite the king's wish that she would go with him to Linlithow and then to Stirling Castle, where Mar and his mother Annabell Murray kept Prince Henry. In October the queen pointedly kept the younger Countess of Mar waiting outside her chamber for an hour at Linlithgow.

Nicholson was given £300 Sterling for Robert Bowes in August 1596. The money was to reimburse sums advanced to James Colville, and was paid by Thomas Foulis and Robert Jousie who administered the king's English subsidy. Sir Robert Cecil encouraged the English courtier Roger Aston with gifts which he sent to Nicholson, including 20 yards of fine black velvet for Aston's wife, Margaret Stewart, who with her mother the Mistress of Ochiltree and sisters was a lady-in-waiting in the household of Anne of Denmark.

== Diplomat in Scotland ==
Bowes sent Nicholson to King James at Linlithgow Palace in October 1597 to discuss border matters concerning a recent meeting at the west ford of Norham Castle which had ended in a gun fight over the Tweed at dusk. Bowes died in November 1597, and George Nicholson began to act as his replacement. He brought letters to James VI at Holyrood Palace in January 1598. James received Nicholson in his audience chamber, and after reading the letters privately in his cabinet, sent Sir George Home to tell him that James was pleased with him and he should visit on the following day.

Nicholson reported on the illness of the bankrupt financier Thomas Foulis who "fell madd sick this day" either because of his debts, or because James VI had taken a valuable jewel from him, known as the "Great H of Scotland." The jewel had been pawned by the king to finance his campaigns against the Catholic northern earls. Nicholson says that Anne of Denmark gave the jewel to her friend, the Countess of Erroll, as a joke, saying that it was little enough for her to have it for a night for the casting down of her husband's house, Old Slains Castle.

=== English comedians ===
In April 1598, when the Duke of Holstein was in Scotland, a group of English actors or comedians came to Edinburgh to perform. A former Provost of Edinburgh, John Arnot made representations to Nicholson that the players scorned James VI and the Scottish people and ought to be stopped in case the "worst sort", the Edinburgh mob, were stirred up to riot. James VI supported another group in November 1599, but the church and town authorities tried to close them down, on religious and moral grounds. This group included Martin Slater and Lawrence Fletcher, and opposition to their performance was led by the minister Robert Bruce.

=== The English succession ===
Nicholson reported on James's response to the Valentine Thomas affair, which could have damaged the king's hopes for the English throne. Nicholson went to Falkland Palace in July 1598 with a letter from Robert Cecil. Roger Aston brought the king the gilt edged paper to write a reply to Queen Elizabeth. Nicholson was lodged in Edinburgh in Mr Molyneux's house in Niddry's Wynd in October 1598.

In February 1600 Nicholson learnt from a well-wisher that James VI was very angry with him and wanted him better watched to discover his contacts. Nicholson had obtained a copy a banned book by Peter Wentworth about the succession printed in Edinburgh. The Lord Secretary, James Elphinstone interviewed the printers Robert Waldegrave, Henry Charteris, Robert Charteris, and a compositor about how Nicholson had obtained the book. The work was A Pithie Exhortation to her Majesty for Establishing a Successor to the Crown, printed by Waldegrave in 1598.

He played cards with James VI at Falkland in May. Nicholson could not speak French so when he met the French ambassador in August 1602, the Baron de Tour, the Lord Sanquhar acted as interpreter for him.

In October 1602 he was in Berwick discussing the border Graham family with Thomas Scrope, the Warden of the West March, and helped the Grahams prepare a petition.

== Retirement ==
In June 1603, after the Union of the Crowns, Nicholson wrote to Robert Cecil about a pension granted by the king, according to Cecil and George Home's instruction, asking for a worthy amount. In August 1603 Nicholson was given an allowance of 5s-6d. per day. As the garrison at Berwick was downscaled, old soldiers petitioned for rewards. Nicholson recommended Jarret Storie to Robert Cecil, for his services as a courier into Scotland in "dangerous times".

Nicholson seems to have then worked at Berwick, as Paymaster, and sent accounts of the garrison to the auditor, Francis Gofton in 1612.
