= Association of 1696 =

The Association was an instrument created after the failed Jacobite assassination plot of 1696 to pledge loyalty to William III of England. Modelled by Lord Somers on the Elizabethan Bond of Association, it placed intense pressure on nonresistant Tories in public life to acknowledge William as "rightful and lawful King". The Association was widely subscribed to by the public, extending well beyond the circle of officials Somers had targeted, and soon assumed the force of law, all Crown officials being required by statute to subscribe to it. Some Tories were purged from office for failure to do so, and the Association remained in legal force until 1702, when William's death rendered it a nullity and the requirement to subscribe to it was repealed.

== Background ==
While High Tories opposed to James II of England's religious policies played an important role in the Glorious Revolution, many had uneasy consciences over the events that followed. The legal fiction in the Bill of Rights 1689 that James had abdicated his throne did not, in their minds, abrogate the oaths to him that they had previously taken. The new oath prescribed to replace the oaths of allegiance and supremacy required those swearing it to "be Faithfull and beare true Allegiance to Their Majestyes King William and Queene Mary". While the nonjurors were unable to reconcile even this to their consciences, some Tories adopted a policy of nonresistance; while they did not recognize William and Mary's right to rule, they consented to cooperate with their regime insofar as it existed.

Lord Somers championed bills in Parliament in April 1691/2 and December 1692 which would have imposed oaths abjuring James and acknowledging William's right to the crown, but both were defeated. The attempted assassination of William in February 1696 gave Somers another chance to drive Tories of doubtful loyalty from public life.

== Creation and initial reception ==
Somers examined the state papers and used the Bond of Association, promulgated in 1584 after the failure of the Throckmorton Plot against Elizabeth I of England, as a model for drawing up an association in defense of William.

As recited in the Act of Parliament that officially sanctioned it, the text of the association was as follows:

Whereas there has been a horrid and detestable Conspiracy formed & carried on by Papists and other wicked and traiterous Persons for assassinating His Majesties Royal Person in order to incourage an Invasion from France to subvert our Religion Laws and Liberty Wee whose Names are hereunto subscribed doe heartily sincerely and solemnly professe testifie and declare That His present Majesty King William is rightfull and lawfull King of these Realmes And wee doe mutually promise and engage to stand by and assist each other to the utmost of our Power in the Support and Defence of His Majesties most Sacred Person and Government against the late King James and all his Adherents And in case His Majesty come to any violent or untimely Death (which God forbid) Wee doe hereby further freely and unanimously oblige ourselves to associate and stand by each other in revenging the same upon His Enemies and their Adherents and in supporting and defending the Succession of the Crowne according to an Act made in the First Yeare of the Reigne of King William and Queen Mary entituled An Act declaring the Rights and Liberties of the Subject and settling the Succession of the Crowne.

The King appeared in Parliament on 24 February 1696 to announce the breaking up of the plot against him, and appealed to Parliament to take (unspecified) measures to ensure the common safety. Sir Rowland Gwynne moved that Parliament should join in an association to defend the King, and introduced the text prepared by Somers. The Association was adopted by the House of Commons on the 25th and the House of Lords on the 27th, although by March 3, 113 MPs and a few dozen peers had still not signed the document.

While the Association was, at this point, still a voluntary bond, social pressure was brought to bear on those who had not signed. A list of non-associators was published in a partisan pamphlet, A Summary Account of the Proceedings upon the happy discovery of the Jacobite Conspiracy. While the pamphlet was condemned as a breach of Parliamentary privileges for publishing excerpts from speeches in both houses, the overall campaign was effective, and several of those named in the pamphlet subsequently signed the Association.

Widespread printing and better communications allowed the Association of 1696 to be much more rapidly disseminated than that of 1584. While the Association had originally been intended as a device to bind officeholders and gentry to the King, it proved to be wildly popular among the lower classes as well. Lists of subscribers to the Association were brought to the King from counties throughout England, usually by Lord Lieutenants, their deputies, or Members of Parliament. The volume of subscriptions briefly overwhelmed the Royal administration. On the suggestion of the Speaker of the House of Commons, Sir John Trevor, they were deposited among the records in the Tower of London in April 1696.

== Passage into law ==
Shortly thereafter, the Association was written into law. The Security of King and Government Act 1695 (passed in 1696 and backdated to the beginning of the Parliamentary session) endorsed the Association and ordered all officers and those receiving pay under the Crown, as well as the households of Prince George and Princess Anne, to subscribe to it within the following year. Future officers and appointees were to subscribe to the Association when they took the oath prescribed by the Test Act; those who failed to subscribe were to forfeit their office, and if they continued to exercise it, be subject to the Test Act's penalties for recusancy. Members of the House of Commons were henceforth to subscribe to the Association when they took their appointed oaths, or be disabled from sitting in Parliament and forfeit their seats. The courts of Chancery and King's Bench, and the courts of quarter sessions, were to keep records of subscribers, and of those who had refused to subscribe. By late July, 86 justices of the peace and 104 deputy lieutenants had been removed from office for failing to subscribe to the Association, or in a few cases subscribing late and without enthusiasm.

== Later years ==
The Signing the Association, etc. Act 1698 postponed the date after which non-subscribers would forfeit their offices until 1 August 1700. After the death of James II in 1701, the Security of the Succession, etc. Act 1701 amended the form of the Association, replacing "against the late King James and all his Adherents" with "against all His Majesties Enemies whatsoever". After the death of King William in 1702, the Association became a nullity, and the Security of the Succession, etc. Act 1702 relieved MPs and officeholders from the necessity of subscribing to it.

== Bibliography ==
- Cressy, David (1982). "Binding the nation: the Bonds of Association, 1584 and 1596". In Guth, DeLloyd J.; McKenna, John W. (eds.). Tudor Rule and Revolution: Essays for G R Elton from His American Friends. Cambridge: Cambridge University Press. ISBN 978-0-521-09127-5.
