= Clare Hunter =

Clare Hunter may refer to:

- Clare Hunter (artist) (born 1950), Scottish artist and writer
- Clare Hunter (coach) (1886-1940), American football and basketball coach
