= Association of Mary, Queen of Scots, and James VI =

Plans for a joint rule between Queen Mary and King James VI

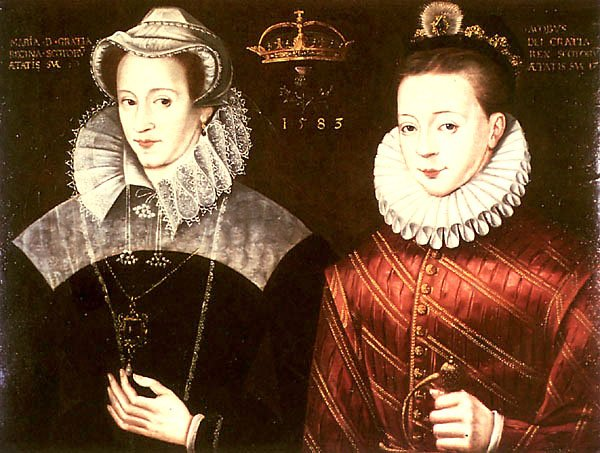
Mary, Queen of Scots and James VI, a double portrait made in 1583, possibly to promote the "association", Blair Castle.

The Association was the name given to plans in the 1580s for Mary, Queen of Scots, to return to Scotland and rule jointly with her son, King James VI. The plans came to nothing, despite diplomatic efforts.

== Background ==
Mary was captured by a confederacy of her nobles at the battle of Carberry. She was taken to Lochleven Castle where she abdicated and her son James VI was crowned at the Church of the Holy Rude at Stirling on 28 July 1567.

Mary escaped from Lochleven and joined her Scottish supporters, but was defeated at the battle of Langside near Glasgow. She rode south and took a boat to England. Elizabeth I decided to keep Mary, who was potentially a claimant to the English throne, a prisoner in England. Scotland was ruled on James's behalf by a series of Regents.

Mary had supporters in Scotland and in France. The French kings did not accept that James VI was the rightful king of Scotland. Mary had hopes that her envoys and diplomatic pressure would influence and persuade the advisors of her son that their best course was to call for her return to Scotland as a joint ruler, the "Association". Efforts were made to secure this outcome after James VI was declared an adult ruler, and having reached his majority in 1579, no longer had a regent appointed to rule for him. In the background, there was a possibility that the Duke of Guise or Spain might intervene, invading both England and Scotland, the Guise plan was known as "L'Impresa", and the Spanish scheme became known as the "Enterprise".

== Negotiations for an associated rule ==
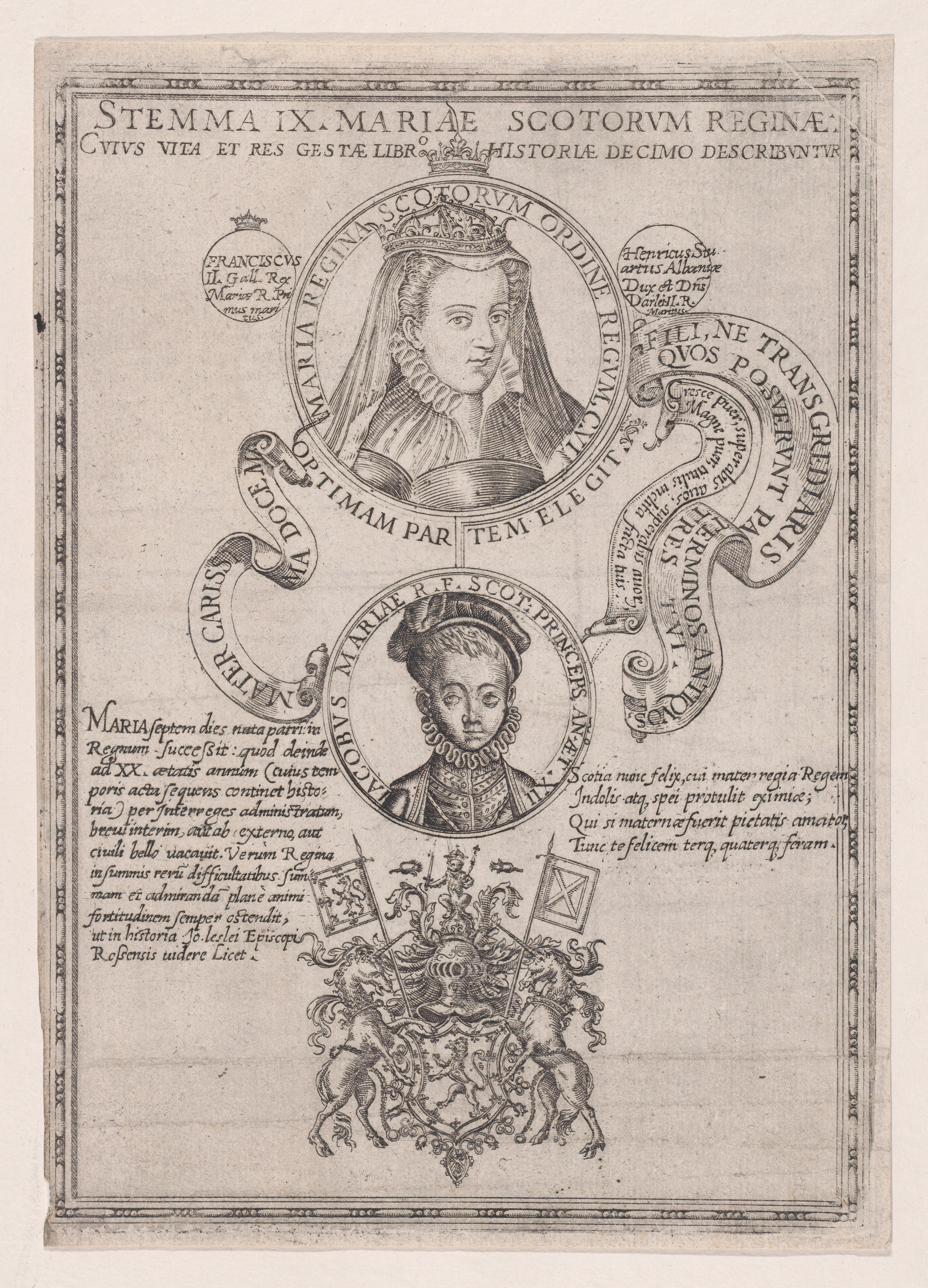
The writings of John Lesley helped establish a context for the association.

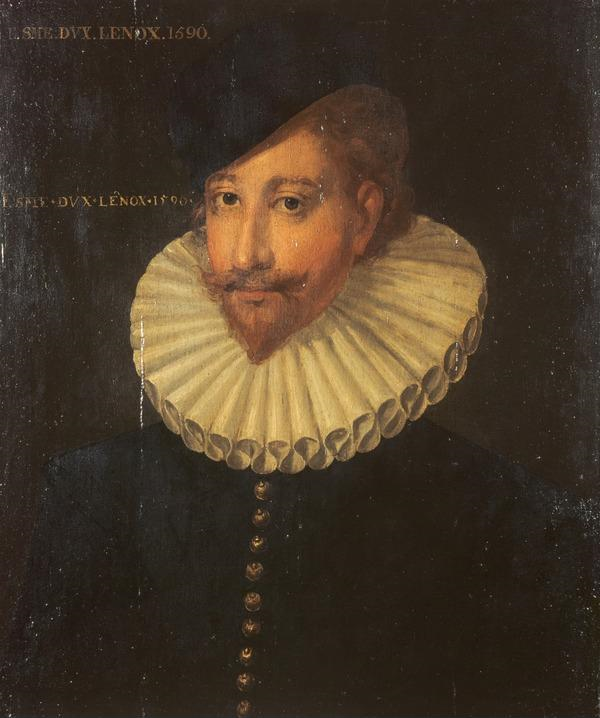
Esmé Stewart, 1st Duke of Lennox was involved in Mary's plan for the association.

The first plans for the "association" can be linked to John Lesley, Bishop of Ross who wrote of the nature of Scottish monarchy in 1579, in his De jure regni apud Scotos, an answer to historical theories of monarchy proposed by George Buchanan which were intended to justify the ending of Mary's rule. The Scottish academic Andrew Melville declared on 27 June 1582 that plans to demit the King's authority to his mother had been brewing for seven or eight years, and he spoke of the "pourtrature of a queene, and of a young childe twelve yeere old" depicted in Lesley's History.

According to the historians David Calderwood and David Hume of Godscroft, surviving veterans of the Queen's side from the Marian civil war secretly worked to forward the Association. They named the Laird of Pittadro and Robert Melville, and others.

Mary made the Duke of Guise her agent and lieutenant in negotiations for the "association à la corone d'Escosse". She drew up details and conditions for joint rule with her ally, James Beaton, Archbishop of Glasgow, in October 1581. According to Mary, her abdication had already been annulled, and revoked, by the bond made by her supporters at Hamilton before the battle of Langside. Her son James would need a second coronation with the proper ancient ceremonies to complete the association. She would then be able to recognise him as a king and encourage her allies to do likewise. They would share resources (even if Mary remained in England), jointly appoint a new Privy Council, and issue coinage with both their portraits. She suggested using an emblem of a Scottish thistle with a ship's stern on the coins, a motif used by Roman emperors, and she adopted a motto for the association Securitas publica, for the safety of the realm.

Mary discussed issuing pardons for her enemies, rebels, and the acts of the former regents. She wanted the restitution of her jewels, many of which had been taken during the civil war in 1573 at the capture of Edinburgh Castle. Ballads and poster propaganda left from the civil war should be destroyed. There should be religious toleration for Protestants and Catholics. Mary envisaged that Archbishop Hamilton would be able to conclude negotiations in France, and the Dukes of Lorraine and Guise would send an envoy to Scotland to obtain letters of support.

Mary identified the nomination of Titus as caesar and heir of the Roman emperor Vespasian as a precedent for harmonious joint rule in Scotland. Traditionally, a Roman building in Scotland, Arthur's O'on, was said to commemorate Vespasian's capture of the jewelled crown and regalia of the Pictish kings. John Bellenden had written in the Scots language of "ane croun of gold sett aboute with precious stanis of vareant colouris" and a sword with a heft of gold and a purple scabbard.

In Scotland, it was said, the Duke of Lennox and the Earl of Arran discussed the idea that James's rule was not properly legitimate, and he should make a "resignment" to Mary, who would then grant him power. Lennox was keen for James to get Mary's endorsement as ruler, but seems not to have been enthusiastic for their joint rule. Mary's plans and her measures to get reparation from her enemies and their associates would have been unlikely to get much support in Scotland.

Mary proposed her scheme for the association to an English negotiator, Robert Beale in 1582. She saw an opportunity to further her plans at the time of Elizabeth's negotiations for her marriage to the Duke of Anjou, brother of Henry III of France. Hopes for the Anjou marriage faded, but Mary remained optimistic. On 28 February 1582, Mary wrote in cipher to the French ambassador Michel de Castelnau summarising her hopes for a "union of wills" a settlement would serve:

to pacify all differences between my good sister and cousin [Elizabeth I] and my son [James VI], to restore to good intelligence and friendship between these two kingdoms and, as much as shall be in my power, to assure her of my said son while assuring him and myself reciprocally of the protection that she has always promised ... so that the union of our wills shall bring about the union of these two kingdoms.

English considerations of the association and other treaties with Mary included two diplomatic details. A ratification of the 1560 Treaty of Edinburgh ought not to appear as a demand from Elizabeth which would signal to other countries that Elizabeth was beholden to Mary. Mary's release or recognition as a ruler might also create the impression that Elizabeth thought she was not culpable of the murder of Lord Darnley. The main English policy concern was that the Association was likely to result in an alliance between Spain and Scotland, perhaps facilitating the use of Scottish harbours as a base for a hostile Spanish fleet.

=== The association and the Ruthven Regime ===
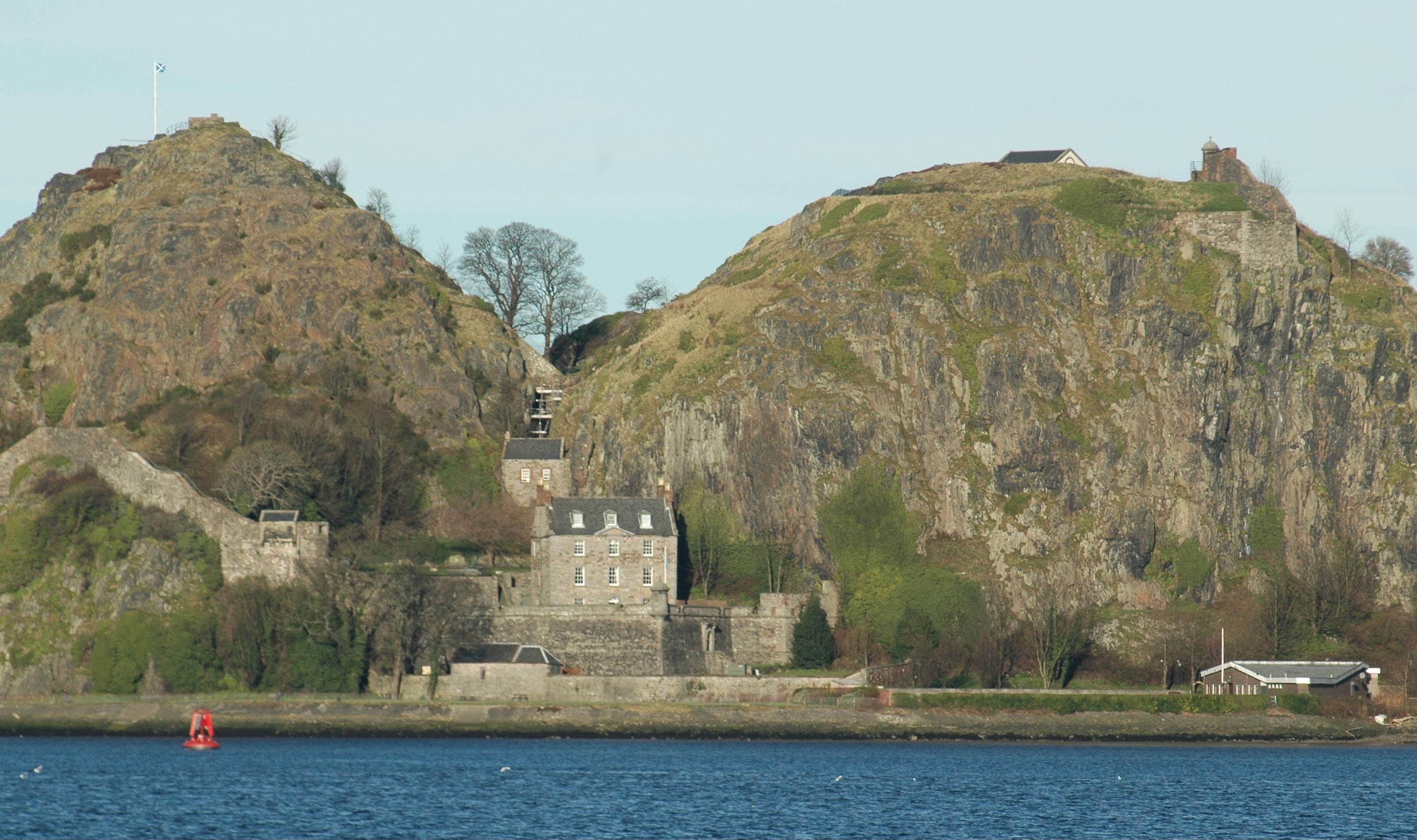
Secret "association" paperwork left at Dumbarton Castle by the Duke of Lennox was destroyed by his lawyer.

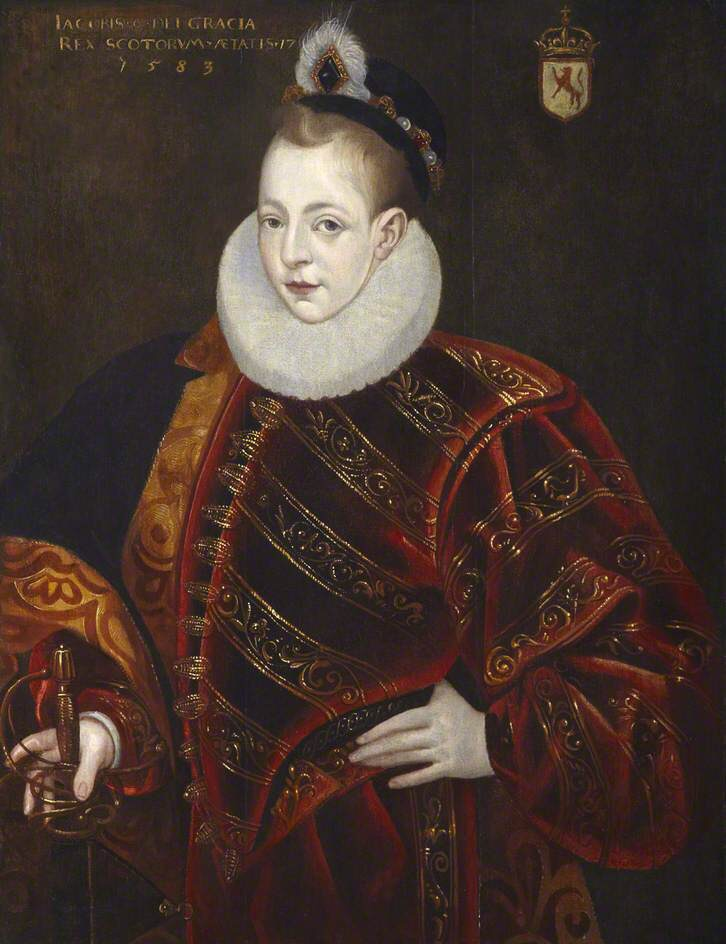
James VI in 1583, possibly by Adrian Vanson

James VI wrote to Mary on 28 May 1582. He had received letters from her via the Duke of Lennox and George Douglas. He seems to have interested in hearing more about her proposals for their union and association. He wrote that the leading courtiers the Earl of Arran and the Duke of Lennox would both work to accomplish the association. A palace coup in Scotland interrupted this phase of the negotiations.

A new regime took control of Scotland in August 1582 by capturing James VI at Huntingtower Castle. The Ruthven Regime was Protestant in character and aligned more with England than France and the Auld Alliance, or any kind of reconciliation with Mary, although negotiations continued. When George Douglas (a brother of the Laird of Lochleven who had helped Mary escape in 1568) came to see James VI at Stirling Castle in September with plans for the association he was imprisoned as a conspirator.

Bertrand de Salignac de la Mothe-Fénelon brought or sent proposals for the association to Scotland, and came to Scotland with François de Roncherolles, sieur de Maineville in January 1583. Elizabeth heard that James VI was interested, and she asked her diplomats William Davison and Robert Bowes to discuss the disadvantages of this course of action with James. The Ruthven Regime governing in Scotland put an end to her plan at this time. Lennox was accused of "practises against the State", including advocating the association to James VI, and opening a correspondence about it which bypassed the Privy Council. A copy of proposed articles of the association treaty was left with the papers of Esmé Stewart, 1st Duke of Lennox at Dumbarton Castle and burnt by his lawyer.

Bowes spoke with James in May 1583, and he said Mary had begun the discussions. At first, James thought she hoped to confirm his rule in Scotland, gain her freedom, and then retire to live in France. He had rejected the plan for the "association" sent to Lennox. Again, in June, James acknowledged his mother's goodwill but had several reservations about the association. James felt that his mother had renounced her claim to the English crown by her abdication at Lochleven, and the claim now resided in him.

The court architect Robert Drummond of Carnock made an estimate for repairing the royal palaces in May 1583. He seems to include Mary, or James's bride-to-be in his plans for Stirling Castle, writing that "our Queen with her train of ladies may pass forth of the new devised work", the western part of the palace, "into the said chapel loft", while James would have a seat in front of the chapel pulpit.

Mary wrote about the association to the French ambassador in London, Michel de Castelnau. She argued that conjoint rule in Scotland would better serve the Auld Alliance and the Catholic faith than the English-leaning Ruthven lords. Her anxieties were increased as tentative negotiations for her son's marriage, to Christina of Lorraine or Catherine of Bourbon, were opened without her. There were also rumours of an English plan for James VI to marry a daughter of Lord Hunsdon, probably Philadelphia Carey, a scheme supported by James Stewart, Earl of Arran.

Mary wrote to Castelnau using cipher code and some of her letters to Castelnau about the association were rediscovered and deciphered in 2022. There is some evidence that Mary opposed French plans involving the Duke of Guise for her rescue by force at this time, thinking that this would prejudice her son's title to the crown of England, but she asked Michel de Castelnau to offer money from her French dowry income to the Guises to maintain their interest in her cause after the fall of the Ruthven Regime.

James freed himself from the Ruthven lords in July. Francis Walsingham advised to Bowes to persuade James not to openly discuss the association treaty or other negotiations with his mother in a forthcoming parliament or convention. Bowes knew the Privy Council were already acquainted with the issues and thought the king's servants loyal to Mary, including Little George Douglas and Robert Douglas, Provost of Lincluden would soon find out the details.

=== Inscriptions at Buxton ===
Mary is said to have engraved inscriptions and heraldic devices on windows at her lodging in Buxton, now the Old Hall Hotel. The devices do not survive but were copied down. The inscriptions were copied in four columns and seem to relate to a large window in the great hall at Buxton. One has a flower with the Latin lines "Eadem de eodem. Unum quidem sed leonem". Literally meaning "from the same the same, one indeed, but a lion", these and other verses appear to be reflections on Mary and her son as rulers of Scotland in 1582. A monogram "MCJS" may be their initials, accompanied with a verse referring to them as a pair.

The "lion" motto also appears in lists of inscriptions found in Mary's apartments.. In one of Mary's embroideries the motto accompanied a lioness and her cub. The emblem was mentioned in William Drummond of Hawthornden's 1619 letter to Ben Jonson describing Mary's bed curtains. Drummond identified the "big lyon and her young whelp" as Mary and James.

=== Fontenay ===
One version of Mary's plan was brought to Scotland by Albert Fontenay in 1584. He mistakenly thought the Chancellor of Scotland, John Maitland of Thirlestane would lend his support. James wrote to his mother in July 1584 that he was pleased with the choice of Fontenay, and would consent as soon as possible to "our association".

Mary thought that Elizabeth would send her back to Scotland, driven by a climate of "extreme fear". Fontenay was optimistic about Mary's plans and opportunities, and in one letter wrote "jamais si belle", that the time was never so good as now.

=== Scandal letter ===
In 1584 Mary composed a letter for Elizabeth I, detailing speeches she said that Bess of Hardwick had made. It is not clear if this "scandal letter" was ever sent, or if the surviving copy was later found in Mary's papers. One detail evokes current thoughts and imaginings about the succession. Bess of Hardwick was said to have consulted with an astrologer, John Lenton, who found an old book predicting Elizabeth's violent death, and her succession by another queen, who Bess thought would be Mary. The new queen would only reign three years before her own assassination. There was a picture of the assassination in the book. Bess would not tell Mary what the final page of the story said. Though Bess knew that Mary thought the prophecy was nonsense, yet it could be linked with Bess's ambitious hopes that her granddaughter Arbella Stuart might marry James V.

=== Nau in London ===
Mary sent her secretary, Claude Nau, to speak for her with Elizabeth in London. The French ambassador Michel de Castelnau offered his support by proposing to fully cooperate with Francis Walsingham and in September sent Walsingham copies of his recent correspondence with Mary. Mary found that the Master of Gray, a Scottish diplomat, had frustrated her plans and negotiations by revealing that James VI and his advisors were not considering the proposals brought by Fontenay.

Castelnau wrote to James VI in February 1585 with Mary's wishes that above anything in the world, she hoped he would be fortunate and prosperous, and be joined with her (estre conjoinctement tous deulx) in a good understanding with Elizabeth, Henry III of France, and Catherine de' Medici. In March, Mary wrote to Castelnau that James's apparent refusal of the association would lead to her denying his royal title, leaving him only with his heritage from his father Lord Darnley. Mary had said the same to Fontenay the year before, to use as a bargaining point with James.

By May 1585, and following William Parry's plot, it was clear there would be no association between Mary and James. The apparent duplicity and detachment shown by Mary and James in the negotiations for the association can appear callous.

=== Bond of Association ===
Meanwhile, in response to the Throckmorton Plot, the English "Bond of Association", at first a vow that all should protect the queen of England, was made law to protect Elizabeth. A version was made at Hampton Court on 19 October 1584. This highlighted various treasons which might be committed by Mary's supporters, and would contribute to the guilty verdict at her trial in 1586.

The Bond of Association was made law by the Act for the Queen's Safety of March 1585. The Act allowed that James VI would not be held responsible for his mother's plots. James VI maintained that he had no dealings with his mother since the mission of the Master of Gray, and he wrote to the Earl of Leicester on 15 December 1586, explaining he had not sought to prefer his mother's rights over his own:

this farre shortlie may I say, I am honest, no changear of course, altogether in all thingis as I professe to be, and quhosoevir will affirme that I had ever intelligence with my mother sen [since] the Master of Grayis being in England, or ever thocht to preferre her to my selff in the title or ever delt in any uther foreyne course, they lie falselie and unhonestlie of me. But speciallie how fonde and insconstant I were if I shude preferre my mother to the title, let all men judge

The Master of Gray retained several documents from this period, and in September 1596 he sent details of the association, a letter from Fontenay to James VI, and the articles of Fontenay's negotiation, and papers relating to the execution of Mary, Queen of Scots, to the Secretary, John Lindsay of Balcarres.
