= Valentine Thomas =

English servant or soldier

Valentine Thomas (died 1603) was an English servant or soldier whose confession in 1598 as a would-be assassin of Elizabeth I caused tension between England and Scotland. Thomas's confession implicated James VI of Scotland, who wrote several letters to Elizabeth to ensure his rights to English throne were unharmed.

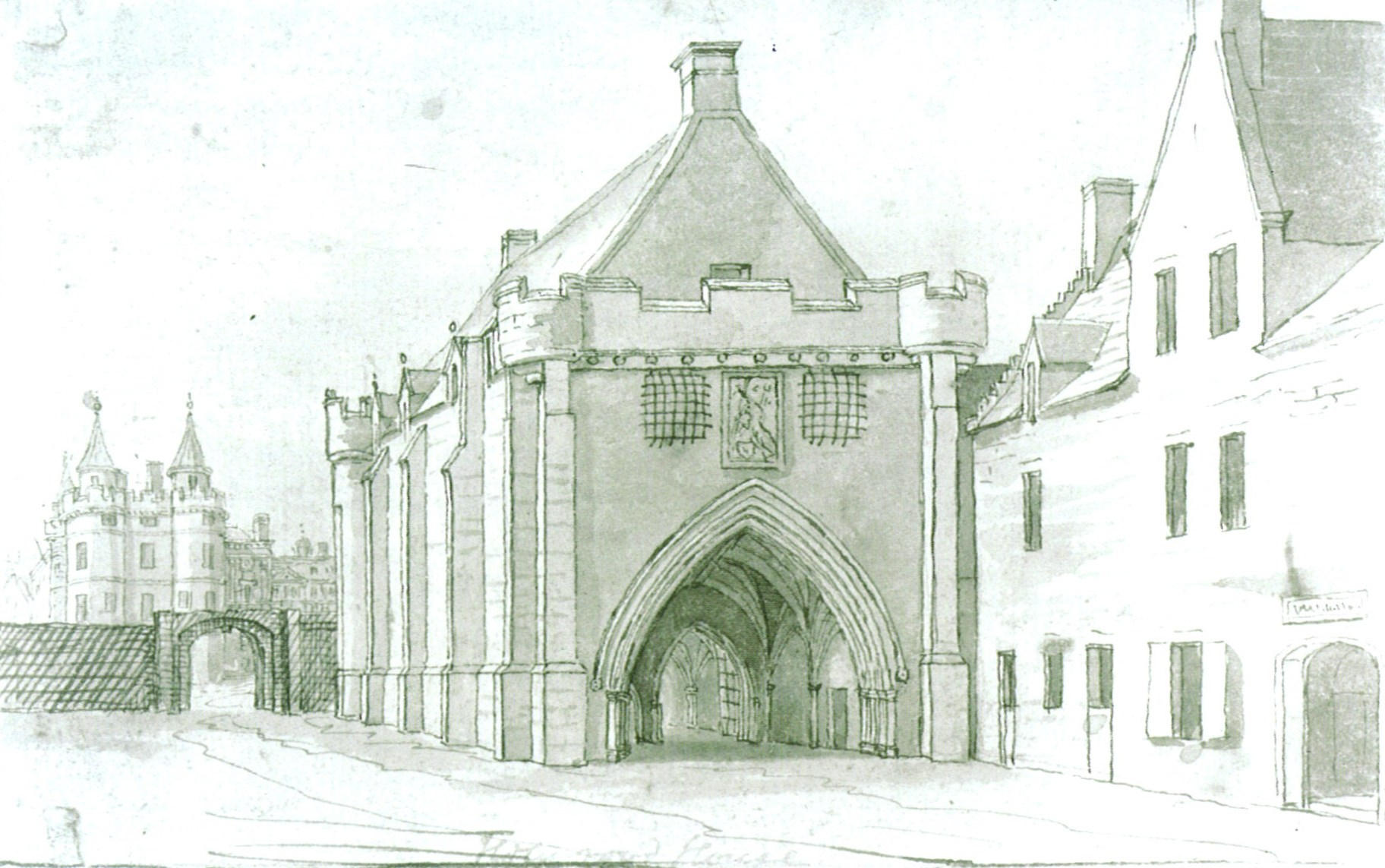
Valentine Thomas said a door keeper had given him access to James VI at Holyrood Palace

== Arrest and confession ==
Valentine Thomas was arrested in March 1598 at Morpeth. A Scottish man captured in England, Robert Crawforth, gave testimony that prompted Thomas's arrest. He described meeting Thomas and the usher or door keeper John Stewart at Holyrood Palace in 1597. John Stewart gave Thomas access to the palace and James VI. James had a servant of that name, John Stewart of Rosland, usually identified as an usher. Crawforth, who was transferred to the Marshalsea prison in London, described one aspect of a conspiracy, that Valentine Thomas had offered to engage the support of English Catholics to put James on the English throne.

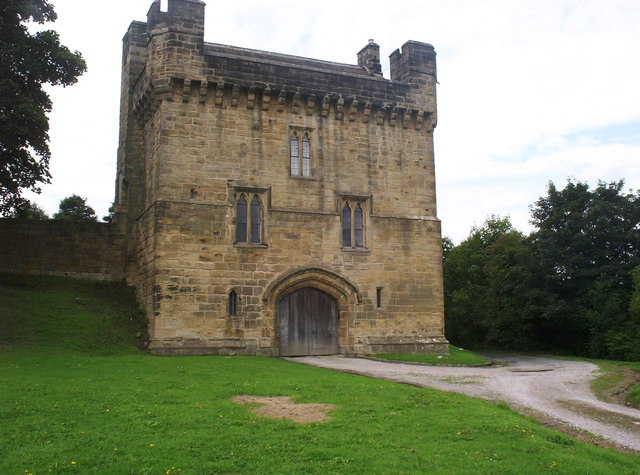
Valentine Thomas was captured by the constable of Morpeth Castle

Crawforth was encouraged to implicate Thomas and assist in his capture by Edward Grey of Howick, constable of Morpeth Castle and depute Border Warden. Thomas was arrested and taken to the Marshalsea and then questioned in the Tower of London. He was to stand trial for a plot rebel with recusants and Pickering in the north of England. After a time, in his conversations with other prisoners and during further questioning he spoke of meetings with James VI and a plot to kill Elizabeth I.

Thomas said he had used alias surnames of Anderson and Alderson. Thomas claimed to have had access to the Scottish royal court via John Stewart, an usher or keeper of the king's chamber door. He said that he had heard James VI wish that William Cecil, the English Lord Treasurer was dead. Thomas said he offered to kill Cecil, and after further discussion, James suggested he should stab Queen Elizabeth while delivering a petition.

It was said that Thomas's confessions also described a meeting at Linlithgow Palace. In his description of the conversation, Thomas said he told James that he was to attend the wedding of a kinsman in Glasgow, and James responded mentioning "Sorley Boy", meaning James MacDonald, a brother of Angus MacDonald of Dunyvaig. Thomas mentioned the Campbell laird of Ardkinglas was present at Holyroodhouse or Linlithgow. James MacDonald was understood to be a kinsman of Sorley Boy MacDonnell, who had been regarded by Elizabeth I as rebel in Ireland.

English authorities were keen to investigate those who crossed the border without permission. In 1599, English agents from Berwick-upon-Tweed captured an English visitor at the Scottish court, Edmund Ashfield, and took him back to England. Ashfield, like Thomas, was interested in James's succession and the potential support of Catholic recusants for his rule in England. Elizabeth I wrote that Ashfield was one of her subjects motivated by their "own humour and busy natures". Ashfield was of gentry status, liitle is known of Thomas's background.

== Diplomacy ==
Although it is unlikely that James VI had instructed Valentine Thomas to assassinate Elizabeth and Cecil, and the allegations were not widely believed, the situation embarrassed James VI. He hoped to succeed Elizabeth (he gained her throne in 1603). Elizabeth had passed laws against plotters in 1585, with an Act of Safety which might work against the Scottish king's ambition.

An English diplomat in Edinburgh, George Nicolson, discovered that James VI had heard of Thomas's confession in April and believed Elizabeth I kept it secret in order to use it against him in the future. Nicolson wrote that James was "much troubled and grieved, albeit in secret sort". One of James's councillors, Edward Bruce, advised that Elizabeth would not believe he was at fault. Other courtiers suggested that Bruce made such suggestions because Elizabeth had given him a rich gold chain as a reward.

Nicolson worried that the ambassadors Peter Young and David Cunningham, Bishop of Aberdeen, sent by James VI to Denmark and to German princes in the wake of the visit of Anne of Denmark's brother the Duke of Holstein to request their future support for his succession to the throne of England would now spread news of "griefs and slanders" suffered by James because of the Valentine Thomas affair.

It was reported in June 1598 that James VI had been told that William Cecil thought the issue was of low importance, that Thomas was "but a knave" and could be released. Edward Bruce told George Nicolson that James was still displeased by the affair, focussing on the failure of the English ambassador William Bowes to keep him informed. James thought the business should have been made open, "kindly discovered", to Bowes and himself.

James prepared to send diplomats including David Foulis to London to try and resolve the situation, and ensure that the king's honour was not dented. On 1 July 1598, Elizabeth I wrote to James that she would "make the deviser have his desert" more for impuning James than his other misdemeanours. Thomas was to be found guilty or indicted of plotting with "Pickering of the North" to rebel with Catholic recusants.

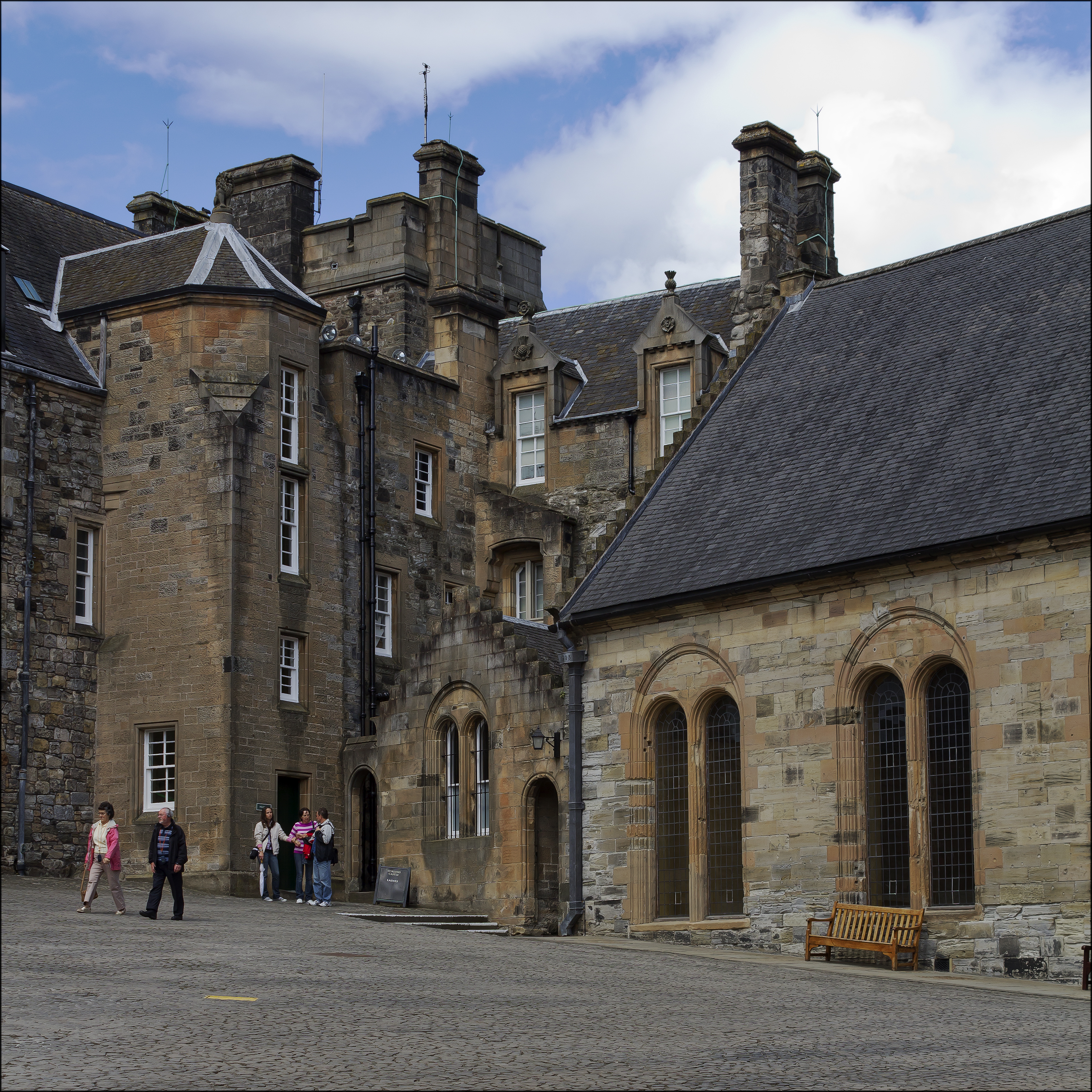
James VI read Valentine Thomas's poem at Stirling Castle on 7 July 1598

James VI was informed that Valentine Thomas had written a poem with charcoal on a chimney breast at the Tower of London:

I shot at a fair white: And in loosing of my arrow
My elbow was wrested. But I melt for grief
To lose such a game: having so fair a mark.
But if I had escaped that wrest, God knoweth without all peradventure
I had won that game: To the great comfort of England
And profit of myself.

Another prisoner, Thomas Madryn, saw the verses and wrote to the Earl of Essex that Thomas was a "very poor poet". James VI read the verses with George Nicolson at Stirling Castle on 7 July. They were puzzled, and James "curiously read them saying and studying what meant he by them".

James VI wrote to Elizabeth on 30 July that the "foggy mists of groundless calumnies" were clearing. He hoped that Thomas's execution could be delayed until he was fully satisfied that he was exonerated in the "minds of all men". Nicolson told him that Thomas was still alive in August.

In September, David Foulis discussed the affair the Privy Council of England at Greenwich Palace with reference to the "Act of Association". The Council insisted Elizabeth I had not tried to slander James using Thomas's confession, and they believed James had never heard of any such plot. Valentine Thomas had been condemned on other charges. There was no need to make any public declaration. Foulis requested a copy of the legal proceedings against Thomas for James VI.

A letter to Foulis from James Elphinstone mentions proposals to send Thomas as a prisoner to Scotland, where he could be interrogated with torture under English supervision and returned to England for execution. Foulis continued his work in London and sent reports back to Scotland by the usual land route, some countersigned by Sir Robert Cecil, and others were sent more securely by sea. He wanted a signed statement, to the effect that Thomas was no more than a vagabond, guilty of various crimes, who had been to Scotland and hoped to avoid execution by making allegations about James VI.

A statement of the key points of the confession dated 20 December 1598 was witnessed by John Peyton, Edward Coke, Thomas Fleming, Francis Bacon, and William Waad. On the same day, Elizabeth signed a declaration that she did not believe there had been a Scottish plot against her and she would continue her good relations with James.

Elizabeth wrote to Nicolson that she considered that James's propositions made by his ambassadors to Christian IV of Denmark and the German princes (concerning the English succession) were composed when he was "transported at that time with sudden and unjust rumours".

The affair seems nearly to have been resolved, Foulis returned to Scotland with £3,000 subsidy money, but James persisted in his view that Thomas ought to be brought to Scotland and tortured. James sent Elizabeth the "true portrait of my thoughts". Another diplomat, James Sempill, was sent to London. In April, Elizabeth made a statement on the affair for William Bowes to deliver to James. Bowes assured James that Thomas was still alive, indicted, but not convicted.

== Execution ==
Valentine Thomas remained a prisoner. He was hanged, drawn and quartered at Saint Thomas Watering on 7 June 1603 after a trial for treason against Elizabeth and her council. James was crowned in London in July.

Researchers at the British Library in 2023 discovered that amongst other revisions the chronicle writer William Camden had abbreviated his account of the Valentine Thomas affair for the publication of his Annals of the Reign of Elizabeth I. The reworking was intended to avoid the king's potential displeasure.
