= Morpeth Castle =

Grade I listed castle in Morpeth, United Kingdom

- Morpeth, Northumberland
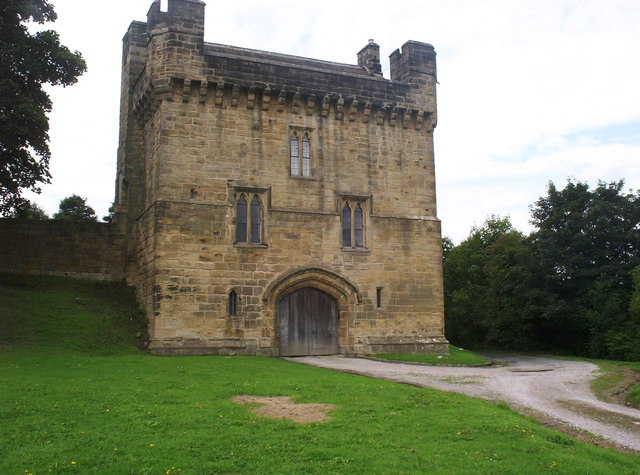
- The gatehouse of Morpeth Castle (the only intact remnants)

Location
- Location in Northumberland
- Coordinates: 55.164°N 1.686°W
- Grid reference: NZ201855

Morpeth Castle is a Scheduled Ancient Monument and a Grade I listed building at Morpeth, Northumberland, in northeast England. It has been restored by the Landmark Trust and is now available as a holiday rental home.

== History ==
The original motte and bailey dating from the 11th century was built on a hill overlooking the River Wansbeck and destroyed by King John in 1216. A new castle was built in the bailey of the original in the 1340s, but little of that structure survives apart from parts of the curtain wall and the much-altered gatehouse. In 1516 Margaret Tudor, sister of Henry VIII and widow of James IV of Scotland, stayed for four months in Morpeth Castle as she fled from her enemies in Scotland and sought refuge with her brother. In 1598, Edward Grey, constable of the castle, captured Robert Crawforth and Valentine Thomas who claimed to be involved in a conspiracy to assassinate Elizabeth I.

The one great military event in the castle's history was in 1644 when a garrison of 500 Lowland Scots held it for Parliament for 20 days against 2,700 Royalists.

The castle was held by and passed by the female line through several illustrious families; de Merlay, Greystoke, Dacre and Howard, none of whom resided there for any long period. In about 1860 the gatehouse was restored and converted to provide a staff residence.

=== Recent History ===
The Castle was rented on a long-term arrangement to the Landmark Trust in 1988 which undertook a complete refurbishment in 1990, restoring many of the gatehouse's original historic features and removing the modern extensions and swimming pool. The gatehouse is now available to rent from the Landmark Trust as holiday accommodation.

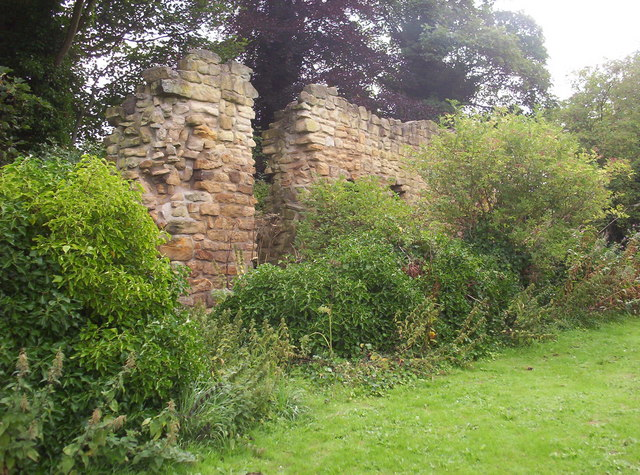
Morpeth Castle walls

== Civil parish ==
Morpeth Castle was a civil parish, in 1951 the parish had a population of 327. Morpeth Castle was formerly a township, from 1866 Morpeth Castle was a civil parish in its own right until it was abolished on 1 April 1935 and merged with Morpeth.
