= David Cressy =

British-born historian

David Cressy is a British-born historian and Humanities Distinguished Professor of History, formerly at The Ohio State University. His specialty is the social history of early modern England, a topic on which he has published a number of monographs including Birth, Marriage, and Death: Ritual, Religion, and the Life-Cycle in Tudor and Stuart England (Oxford UP, 1997) and England on Edge: Crisis and Revolution, 1640–1642 (Oxford UP, 2006). His dissertation for the Ph.D. was a two-volume work: v.1. "Education and literacy in London and East Anglia, 1580-1700" and v.2. "Schoolmasters in the dioceses of London and Norwich."

Cressy's work Gypsies: An English History (Oxford UP, 2018) has been described as "an accessible book, which gives us a sympathetic narrative of a people who are very much part of the English story."
