= Safety of the Queen, etc. Act 1584 =

Act of the Parliament of England

- Act of Parliament
- Parliament of England
- Long title: An Act for Provision to be made for the Surety of the Queen's Majesty's most Royal Person, and the Continuance of the Realm in Peace.
- Citation: 27 Eliz. 1. c. 1
- Territorial extent: England and Wales

Dates
- Royal assent: 23 March 1587
- Commencement: 23 November 1584 (Note: Start of session.)
- Repealed: 28 July 1863

Other legislation
- Repealed by: Statute Law Revision Act 1863

Status: Repealed

Text of statute as originally enacted

The Safety of the Queen, etc. Act 1584 (Note: The act was actually passed in March 1585 but is listed under 1584 because under the common law acts of Parliament took effect retrospectively from the beginning of the session in which they were passed, which in this case was 1584: see the article Acts of Parliament (Commencement) Act 1793 for the explanation as to why.) (27 Eliz. 1. c. 1), also known as the Act of Association 1584, was an act of the Parliament of England during the English Reformation. It required a tribunal of at least 24 peers and privy councillors to investigate "any open invasion or rebellion" in England, any attempt to injure Queen Elizabeth I, or any attempt by a pretender to seize the throne. Any person found to be guilty was to be disabled from inheriting the throne, and was to be "pursued to death by all the Queen's subjects." Also any act "whereby the Queen's life shall be shortened" was made a capital offence.

The act developed to include the Bond of Association, which was mindful of threats to Elizabeth posed by Mary, Queen of Scots. The Act for the Safety of the Queen, or Surety of the Queen's Person, passed in March 1585, allowed that James VI of Scotland would not be held responsible for his mother's plots. James was occasionally troubled by incidents including the Valentine Thomas affair, which could have implicated him in plots against Elizabeth, and hindered his accession to the English throne.

== Subsequent developments ==
The whole act was repealed by section 1 of, and the schedule to, the Statute Law Revision Act 1863 (26 & 27 Vict. c. 125), which came into force on 28 July 1863.

== See also ==
- Jesuits, etc. Act 1584 (27 Eliz. 1. c. 2)
