= Clare Hunter (artist) =

Scottish textile artist and writer (born 1950)

- Born: 1950 (age 75–76); Glasgow
- Education: University of Glasgow; Durham University
- Notable work: Threads of Life: a History of the World through the Eye of a Needle
- Style: textile arts
- Website: sewingmatters.co.uk

Clare Hunter (born 1950) is a Scottish textile artist and writer. Her first book, Threads of Life: a History of the World through the Eye of a Needle (2019), was a BBC Radio 4 Book of the Week.

== Early life and education ==
Hunter was born in 1950 in Glasgow. She learnt to sew as a child from her mother. Hunter attended the University of Glasgow, where she did a degree in English and drama; one of her tutors was Jennie Erdal, whom she praised. Hunter went on to study directing at the Bristol Old Vic, where she learnt to make theatrical costumes. Following her research for Threads of Life, she started a master's degree at Durham University.

== Career ==
Hunter is a community artist and textile artist, and specialises in banner-making. She has been active in politics, including the People's March for Jobs and the 1984–1985 United Kingdom miners' strike.

In her twenties, she worked in youth theatre and was the director of Salisbury Arts Centre. She then worked as an arts consultant in London, but decided to move back to Scotland. In Glasgow in 1986 she set up a community interest company, NeedleWorks, which ceased trading in the early 1990s. Its aim was to create employment for people who had not achieved qualifications. As part of the city's year as European Capital of Culture, she worked with the community and with another textile artist, Malcolm Lochhead, on twelve banners representing Glaswegian life, Keeping Glasgow In Stitches.

== Writing ==
Hunter received a Creative Scotland grant to write her first book, Threads of Life: a History of the World through the Eye of a Needle (2019). She has said that she is interested in "the social, emotional, or political context" of sewing, and that the history of sewing is a way of examining women's history: "Viewing history through the lens of needlework allows us unedited access to women’s sewn testimonies and reveals what mattered most to them". She writes about the ways in which sewing has been underestimated and ignored, and how it has been used in protest.

Her second book, Embroidering her Truth: Mary Queen of Scots and the Language of Power (2023), is about the embroidery of and other textiles related to Mary, Queen of Scots. Her third book is Making Matters: In Search of Creative Wonders (2025).

== Reception ==
Threads of Life was a BBC Radio 4 Book of the Week in 2019. A review in the journal Textile: Cloth and Culture said that "The book's vivid descriptions of sewing, textiles, and the accompanying processes are embedded with the kind of rich detail only a stitcher could know ... a novel and much-needed addition to the field of history, anthropology, and textiles", though the reviewer was disappointed that the book has no illustrations. The Fashion Studies Journal said that "A certain Scottishness permeates the entire book ... The soaring and somewhat indulgent quality of Hunter’s language makes for good (but still smart!) pleasure reading".

The Scotsman said of Embroidering her Truth that "Hunter's retelling illuminates [Mary's life] in unexpected ways". The Observer described Making Matters as a "hymn to the sensory wonder and connectivity of the homemade".

The fashion designer Maria Grazia Chiuri was influenced by Hunter's Threads of Life to highlight the work of Indian garment workers, particularly embroiderers, in Dior's collection for the 2021 Paris Fashion Week, and by Embroidering her Truth in the 2024 show.

== Personal life ==
Hunter lives in Stirlingshire.

== Books ==
- Threads of Life: a History of the World through the Eye of a Needle (2019, Sceptre at Hodder & Stoughton)
- Embroidering her Truth: Mary Queen of Scots and the Language of Power (2023, Sceptre at Hodder & Stoughton)
- Making Matters: In Search of Creative Wonders (2025, Sceptre at Hodder & Stoughton)
