= Bond of Association =

1584 British legal document

The Bond of Association was a document created in 1584 by Francis Walsingham and William Cecil after the failure of the Throckmorton Plot in 1583. Its purpose was to deter attempts to assassinate Elizabeth I.

== Contents ==
The document obliged all signatories to execute any person that:

- attempted to usurp the throne
- successfully usurped the throne
- made an attempt on Elizabeth's life
- successfully assassinated Elizabeth

In the last case, the document also made it obligatory for the signatories to hunt down the killer.

== Royal approval ==
Elizabeth authorised the Bond to achieve statutory authority.

== Implications ==
The Bond of Association was a response to the assassination of William the Silent in July 1584, and the continuing threat posed to Elizabeth I by the supporters of Mary, Queen of Scots as a rival claimant to the English throne, in the aftermath of the discovery of the Throckmorton Plot.

Mary, Queen of Scots, was herself a signatory of the bond, giving her assent at Wingfield Manor on 5 January 1585. In March 1585, the Bond of Association was in part incorporated in the Act for the Queen's Safety.

The Bond was a key legal precedent for the execution of Mary, Queen of Scots, in 1587. Walsingham discovered alleged evidence that Mary, in a letter to Anthony Babington, had given her approval to a plot to assassinate Elizabeth and by Right of Succession take the English throne.

== See also ==
- Association of Mary, Queen of Scots, and James VI
