= Charles de Prunelé, Baron d'Esneval =

French diplomat (1566–1624)

Charles de Prunelé, Baron d'Esneval (1566–1624) was a French diplomat and ambassador in Scotland in 1586. He is known by his title, as "D'Esneval", or "D'Aisneval", or "D'Anneval".

== Family background ==
He was the son of André de Prunelé (died 1581) and Marguerite le Veneur. The Château d'Esneval is at Pavilly, Seine-Maritime. Charles de Prunelé also inherited substantial estates from two cousins.

== Mission to Scotland ==
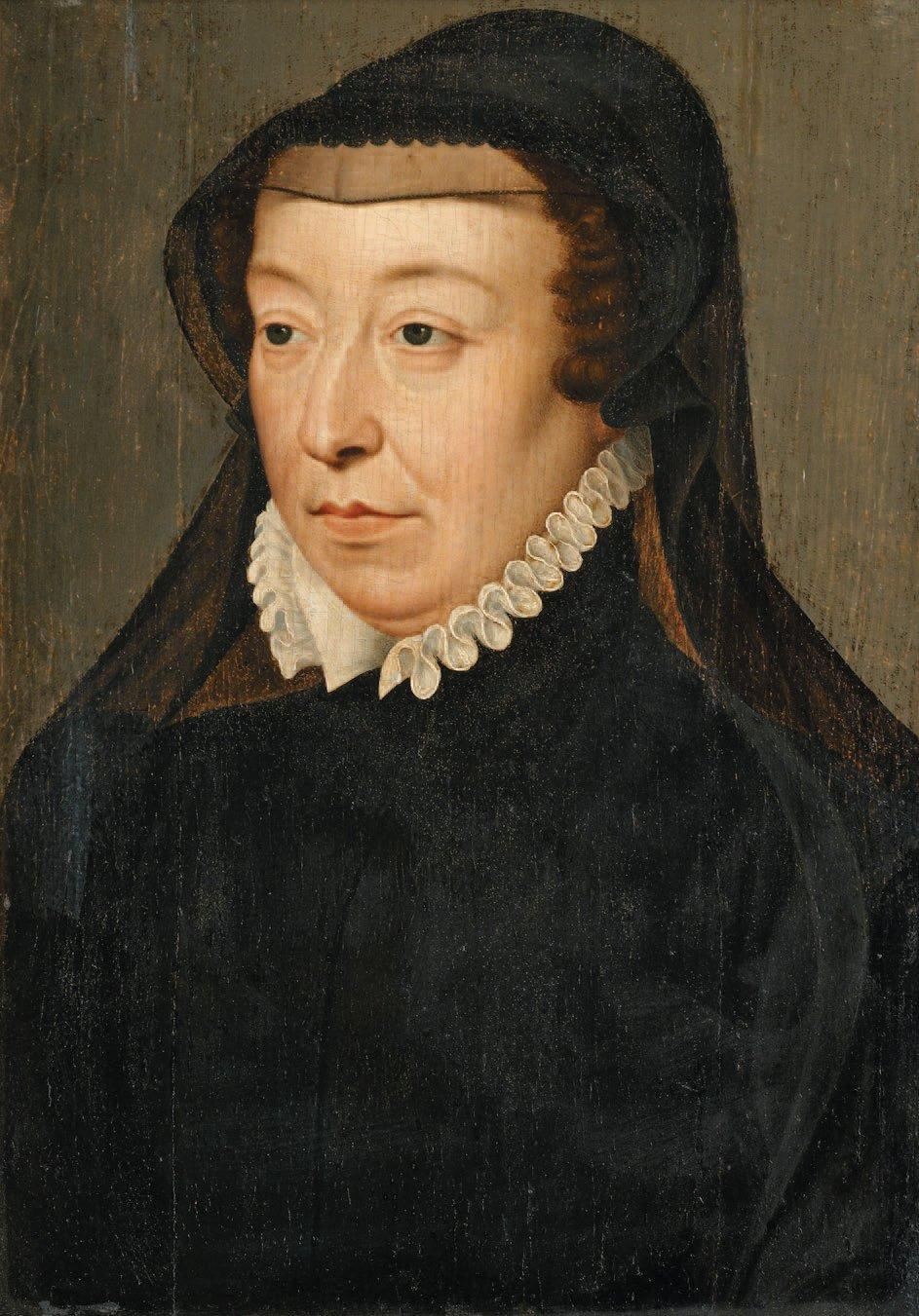
Catherine de' Medici wanted D'Esneval to discover the Scottish king's marriage plans

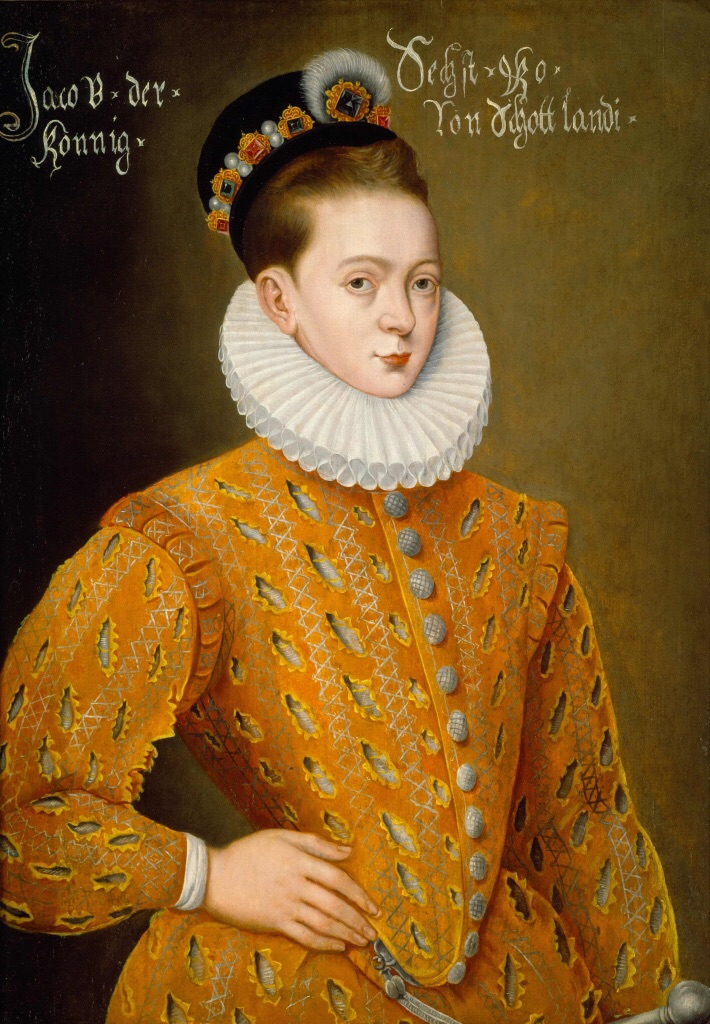
James VI told D'Esneval that his portrait painter was a busy man. Portrait attributed to Adrian Vanson, HES, Edinburgh Castle

D'Esneval seems to have gained prominence at the French court and an appointment as a diplomat following his marriage in 1583 to Madeleine Pinart (died 1654), a daughter of the French Secretary of State, Claude Pinart. There were suggestions in August 1584 that he, or his brother-in-law, might go to Scotland as a diplomat. In 1586 he was sent to Scotland and welcomed by David Beaton of Melgund, a Master of Household to James VI. His wife, Madeleine Pinart, remained at the French court as a dame d'honneur to Catherine de Medici.

Henry III of France and his mother Catherine de' Medici wrote to James VI in November 1585, introducing the new resident ambassador charged with promoting the Auld alliance. Henry III intended that D'Esneval would present a gold ring worth 500 Écu to Claude Hamilton, and gave Hamilton a letter for James also introducing D'Esneval as a resident diplomat. The appointment of a resident ambassador was a recognition by the Valois court that James VI, rather than his mother, the exiled Mary, Queen of Scots, was ruler of Scotland.

Mary, Queen of Scots, hoped D'Esneval would be able keep open her communications with her son James VI and further the Auld Alliance. She wrote to D'Esneval asking him to send updates on James's health and affairs. She also thought he was inexperienced and unlikely to have much knowledge of Scottish affairs. Mary had a better opinion of his time-served companion, the Monsieur de Courcelles, a secretary of the French ambassador in London, Guillaume de l'Aubespine de Châteauneuf.

David Moysie wrote that D'Esneval was 24 years old and arrived in Leith on 13 January He identified D'Esneval by another of his titles, as "de Gazeran" or "Gofferon". The Master of Gray wrote about the arrival of D'Esneval to Francis Walsingham, saying he was very young. He noted that Courcelles, formerly a secretary to Michel de Castelnau, was his advisor, and was now known as "De Preau". Meanwhile, William Cecil wrote to the Earl of Leicester with news that James VI had sent his envoy William Keith of Delny to London to conclude their league. Cecil described the situation of the rival diplomats in Scotland in his letter:

Mr Randolph is to go to the Scottish king, and so the treaty, as I think, shall go forward. Time must try these things, for we find that the French king hath sent, by sea, a baron of France, the son-in-law of Pinart's, a man of great living but of little understanding, and therfore he hath a shrewd instrument with him, called Courcelles, whom your lordship did, I think, know here with Mauvissière (Castelnau), a notable servitor to the Scottish queen and the house of Guise, and, adding to this, that we understand how Lethington, the secretary in Scotland, and Robert Melville, who both remain in good credit with the king, are devoted to the king's mother and to France, we may doubt of the events.

D'Esneval had an audience with James VI on 18 February. When the English diplomat Thomas Randolph arrived in Edinburgh, James VI told him D'Esneval was younger than him, and had no experience of Scotland. Randolph reminded James that the ambassador's intention was the important matter.

Randolph noted that D'Esneval had an audience with James VI at Holyroodhouse on 7 May. Walsingham was convinced that D'Esneval had brought a significant sum of money to Scotland, possibly originating in Spain, while Randolph only had words to counter the effect of this gold. D'Esneval and Monsieur de Courcelles tried to form opposition in the Scottish court to the Treaty of Berwick (1586) with England. Their efforts were unsuccessful, due in part to the banishment of their ally at court, James Stewart, Earl of Arran, and offers of an English subsidy. On 3 July, D'Esneval wrote to Henry III about the English treaty, and a conversation he had with James about personal letters from his mother since the mission of Albert Fontenay.

D'Esneval made representations to James VI that Scottish soldiers ought not to be recruited for the Protestant King of Navarre. His letters were interecepted in England, and Francis Walsingham passed them to Thomas Phelippes for decipher and comment.

== Portraits and diplomacy ==
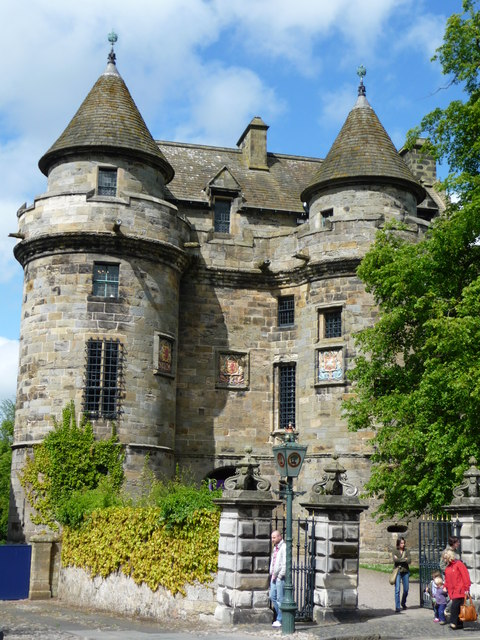
D'Esneval stayed with the court at Falkland Palace until he left Scotland in August 1586.

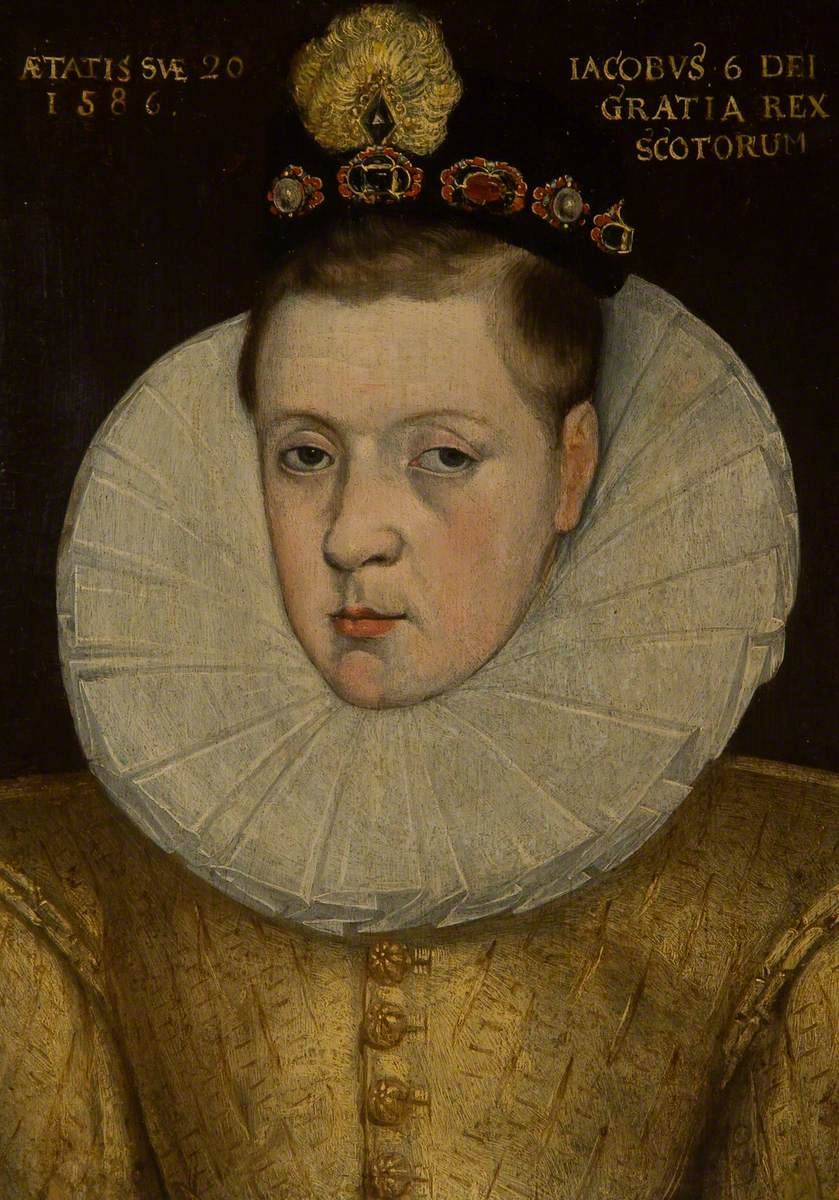
Portrait of James VI, dated 1586, National Trust for Scotland, Falkland Palace

James VI spent the summer at Falkland Palace, after a few days at Dunfermline, remaining at Falkland from 12 June to the end of August, and D'Esneval stayed with him. D'Esneval brought up the subject of a portrait of James VI requested by Mary, Queen of Scots with James VI, before the king left for Stirling and a hunting trip. She had written to him on 30 April (and to Courcelles) asking him to procure a life-size picture taken from life (recouvrer de mon filz ung sien pourtraict en grand, faict sur sa personne propre). James VI was pleased at this sign of his mother's care for him. He suggested a life-size copy of a recently made portrait could be made by a painter, who was much in demand, as no other such portrait painter was to be found in Edinburgh (n'est retrouvir que luy en tout Lyslebourg).

Catherine de' Medici was anxious to know about the king's negotiations to marry Catherine of Bourbon (a sister of Henry of Navarre) or a Danish princess. On 3 July, D'Esneval wrote to Catherine de' Medici that James had sent his commissioners to Berwick-upon-Tweed for the league with England. He also wrote about the painter and the portraits. James intended to send the first version of the portrait to Denmark, (son pourtraict qu'il veut envoyir en Dannemarc). In France, a spy for England strained to overhear Secretary Pinart discussing his son-in-law D'Esneval's letters with Catherine de' Medici.

James sent Peter Young and Colonel William Stewart to Denmark to discuss his potential marriage on 20 July. Young had an audience with Frederick II at Kronborg in August. Courcelles noted Young's return, and understood that his mission included the subject of Orkney and the marriage of one of the Danish king's daughters.

A portrait of a youthful James VI attributed to Adrian Vanson was acquired for display at Edinburgh Castle in 1996, and may be the picture sent to Denmark. Another version of James's portrait, dated 1586, is displayed at Falkland Palace.

When D'Esneval left Scotland, he wrote to Courcelles from Berwick-upon-Tweed and returned his hackney horse. D'Esneval asked Courcelles to liaise with the painter, "pour le tableau du mon paisage" (for my landscape), to agree a price and pay him, perhaps meaning the portrait of James or another work. D'Esneval also mentioned a promise of the Captain of Falkland Palace, James Beaton.

Although diplomats including Guillaume de Salluste Du Bartas and Claude de l'Isle de Marivaux continued to negotiate for the marriage of James VI to Catherine of Bourbon, a plan with some support from England, he married Anne of Denmark in 1589. Denmark appeared neutral in Europe's religious conflicts.

== Arrest of Anthony Babington ==
D'Esneval left Scotland in August 1586. Soon after his return to London, the arrest of Anthony Babington was announced. D'Esneval and Châteauneuf both describe celebratory bonfires and the ringing of church bells. They had an audience with Elizabeth I at Windsor Castle. After five days in London, D'Esneval went to Rye to get a boat and return to the French court to relate the details to Henry III. Francis Walsingham sent intercepted letters from d'Esneval and Châteauneu to Thomas Phelippes for deciphering.

D'Esneval wrote a memorandum for Henry III about the discovery of the Babington Plot. He wrote that some of the men serving him and Châteauneuf were arrested during the search for Babington in London. He had heard that Babington was found hiding in a wood (he was at St John's Wood and taken at Harrow on 14 August), that Mary had been taken to Tixall, that her secretaries Claude Nau and Gilbert Curle were arrested, and Bess Pierrepont (Nau's fiancé) had been (or would be) taken to the Tower of London. There was speculation that the female prisoner alleged to be in the Tower was not Pierrepont, but Mary herself. One of Mary's cipher clerks (Nau's niece's husband), Jérôme Pasquier, had been taken to the Tower from Chartley, and Francis Walsingham was considering bringing Mary to London.

D'Esneval heard that a copy of Mary's will had been discovered, in which she gave her title to England and Scotland to the King of Spain. He thought this was announced to turn her son James VI against her.

D'Esneval wrote letters with similar news for Courcelles who had stayed in Scotland. Elizabeth was angry that Courcelles remained at the Scottish court. At first, D'Esneval thought the Babington affair might blow over, being only the "special affection which some young (Jesuit) gentlemen students had to the religion rather than an enterprise against the state".

Henry III wrote to James VI on 2 November 1586 about his good news and the "ill news of his mother" received from D'Esneval. Henry III hoped that James VI would, in all his communications with Elizabeth, ensure the safety of his mother. Courcelles would remain in Scotland as his diplomat.

== Death ==
His diplomat career ended with the disgrace of his father-in-law Claude Pinart following the Day of the Barricades. Charles de Prunelé died in Paris at the Hotel D'Esneval in the Rue de Jardinet. After the death of his eldest son Nicolas in 1653, the D'Esneval title passed to a son of his daughter Françoise, André de Tournebu.
