= Elizabeth Pierrepont =

British gentlewoman

Elizabeth or Bess Pierrepont (1568–1648) was a gentlewoman in household of Mary, Queen of Scots. Mary hoped that she could be trained to join the household of Queen Elizabeth, and prevented her marrying as her father wished.

== Career ==
She was a daughter of Henry Pierrepont and Frances Cavendish. Her parents' home was Holme Pierrepont Hall near Nottingham. She was a granddaughter of Bess of Hardwick.

A French diplomat Guillaume de l'Aubespine de Châteauneuf wrote that she was a niece of the Earl of Shrewsbury and had joined the household of Mary, Queen of Scots, in England at a young age. She ate at Mary's table and slept with her.

When Mary was at Worksop Manor in September 1583, she wrote a letter to "Bess Pierpont", who was at home with her family. Mary thanked her for a letter and a gift, and was going to give her a black gown with a "garniture" or trimmings for her to wear with it, ordered from London.

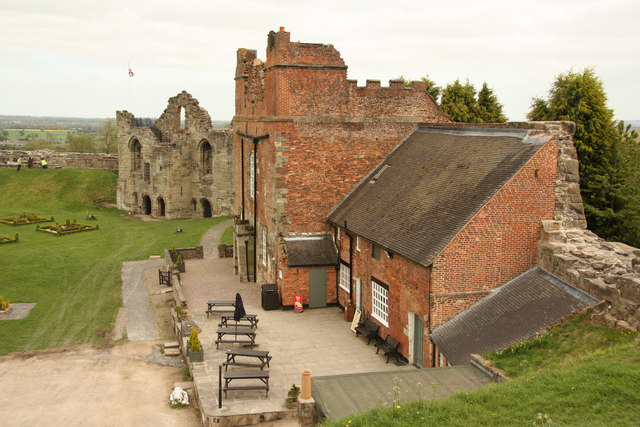
Mary, Queen of Scots was held at Tutbury Castle, conveniently close to a house belonging to Bess Pierrepont's parents

Mary's keeper Ralph Sadler described her father as a "peevish Papist" to Francis Walsingham. Her father in April 1585 had written inviting her to come to visit them at Woodhouse, relatively close to Tutbury Castle, before they moved further away. He had expected her to come straight away and sent his servant with a bag for her night things. Sadler did not like this at all. He told Henry Pierrepont's servant that they should have written to him first, and it was a shame that the young maiden was "nourished and brought up here in Popery".

== Pierrepont and the French secretary ==
Pierrepont seems to have had a relationship with Mary's French secretary Claude Nau, and in April 1586 he sent a friend to discuss marriage with her father. Nau sent letters about the marriage negotiations to a secretary of the French ambassador called Cordaillot. The letters were carried by the double agent Gilbert Gifford alias Cornelius.

Mary was not at first in favour of this marriage. She wrote that when Pierrepont was 17 she could be married and thought married life would improve her figure, and that keeping her in the household unmarried might incur the disapproval of Bess of Hardwick. Her marriage would also help "bring forward" her younger sister Grace Pierrepont. The marriage to Nau did not take place. Nau's English servant had been a member of Henry Pierrepont's household.

Amias Paulet was in charge at Chartley. He thought Mary was happy for Pierrepont to marry Nau. He wrote that "great cost is bestowed on Mistress Pierrepont in garments of all sorts, wherein cloth of silver and gold and silver lace are not spared". On 6 June 1586, he advised she should be removed from the household at Chartley. He wrote to Walsingham about his conversation with Mary about Bess Pierrepont and her possible return to her parents' house. The subject of her clothes came up, Mary said the tailor had been injured in a drunken quarrel, but Paulet said she had sufficient clothes. Mary said that Pierrepont did not have enough linen smocks. Mary also told Paulet that Pierrepont should stay because Bess of Hardwick did not love her.

Dominique Bourgoing, who wrote a narrative of Mary's arrest, said that a document recording a promise of marriage between Nau and Pierrepont, written on parchment and signed by Mary's "damoiselles", was among papers taken when Mary was at Tixall in August 1586. This made Mary angry as it touched the honour of Nau and the Master of Household Andrew Melville.

== Letters about Elizabeth Pierrepont's future ==
A number of Mary's letters to the French ambassador Guillaume de l'Aubespine de Châteauneuf (1547-1625) discuss plans for Elizabeth Pierrepont. In May 1586, Mary thought about sending Pierrepont back to her parents in May 1586, particularly because she had a quarrel with Bess of Hardwick, Pierrepont's grandmother. In June, her father asked permission from Queen Elizabeth for his daughter to leave Mary's service, with a view to having her married. Mary was reluctant for her to leave. Henry Pierrepont sent horses to fetch her from Chartley Castle, but Mary would not let her go, despite the arguments of her keeper Amias Paulet.

In July, Mary wrote that she had no particular plans for Pierrepont's marriage. She had brought her up in her household from the age of four, and had hoped that she would become a servant of Queen Elizabeth. Now however, Mary wanted her go as she reminded her too much of Bess of Hardwick, and thought she would make a bad husband for any friend of hers.

== Babington Plot ==
Mary was taken from Chartley to Tixall, the house of Walter Aston on 11 August 1586. Her secretaries Curle and Nau were arrested. While Mary was at Tixall, her papers were searched. Amias Paulet had suggested that Pierrepont be separated from the queen when they were in Walter Aston's park. She would be hosted by a local landowner.

According to Dominique Bourgoing, Pierrepont was taken from Mary's company before the queen reached Tixall in August 1586, and then removed from Chartley with the almoner Camille du Preau and Elizabeth Braye, her servant. Preau was held at the house of Thomas Gresley. On 27 August 1586, Amias Paulet considered dismissing Pierrepont's maid and placed her in Mr Chetwynd's house at Ingestre.

When arrests were made in connection with the Babington Plot in September 1586, it was rumoured that Pierrepont had been taken to the Tower of London. The French diplomat Charles de Prunelé, Baron d'Esneval recorded speculation that the female prisoner alleged to be in the Tower was not Pierrepont, but Mary herself. The prisoner was Nau's nephew, Jérôme Pasquier, one of Mary's cipher clerks, who was taken to the Tower from Chartley.

== Later life ==
Thomas Fowler, a servant of Margaret Douglas, wrote about plans for the "Scots Queen's woman Besse Peyrepont" to marry a man called Markham, probably a son of Thomas Markham of Ollerton and Kirby Bellars.

She is sometimes said to be the "Elizabeth Pierrepont" who married Sir Thomas Erskine in 1604.

She is identified as the wife of Richard Stapleton of Carlton and the mother of the courtier and poet Robert Stapylton. She died in 1648.
