= Jean Champhuon, sieur du Ruisseau =

French lawyer, administrator and chamberlain

Jean or Jehan Champhuon, sieur du Ruisseau was a French lawyer and an administrator and chamberlain of the estates of Mary, Queen of Scots. He served on her French council.

== Family connections ==
Increasingly over the years, the French lawyers and clerks serving Mary in England were drawn from closely related families. Du Ruisseau married Claire Nau in 1563, her younger brother Claude Nau became Mary's secretary for the French language during her years in England. Jérôme Pasquier, a household clerk for Mary in England was married to their daughter Madeleine Champhoun.

Du Ruisseau was master of Mary's (French) accounts from 1575. His brother, Pierre Champhuon, joined Mary's French council in 1584. Claude Nau wrote twice to his brother, meaning du Ruisseau, from Sheffield in August 1577 using cipher codes. He hoped that du Ruisseau could be promoted to be treasurer of Mary's French dowry, and that du Ruisseau would speak to his own advantage at the French court. Nau also asked him to buy some jewellery and send it to him in a sealed package (une petite boite fermee et cachetee); a pair of bracelets in the latest fashion, and a diamond or emerald shaped like a heart or triangle.

In a letter to Claude Nau, Albert Fontenay, a diplomat and relation of Claude Nau, described M. du Ruisseau's affection to their cousin "de Beauvois" and their mutual blood relatives of the surname Nau. Du Ruisseau was going to help negotiate Fontenay's marriage to the daughter of Masuyer, another Parisian lawyer already within their family circle.

== Roles ==
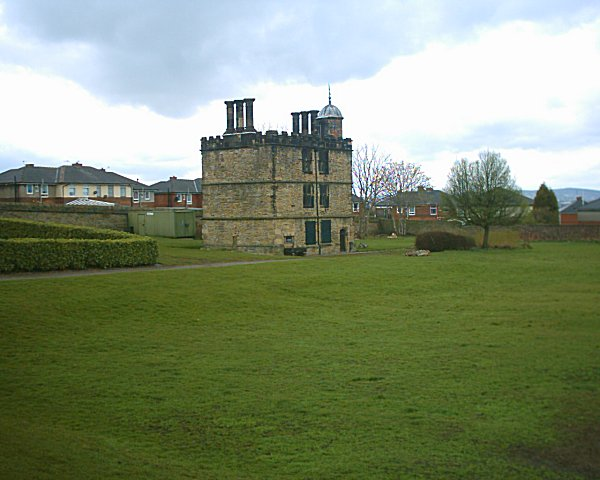
Du Ruisseau was required to stay at Sheffield Manor for longer than he planned.

Jean Champhuon served on Mary's council for her French estates. He was superintendent of Vermandois in 1581. He was promoted to be Mary's chancellor and keeper of her seals for French administration on 2 May 1585. He was frequently mentioned in her correspondence for money matters and as a conduit for the passage of her letters to her allies and the French court.

The French ambassador in London, Michel de Castelnau, helped get a passport for Du Ruisseau so he could travel and help Mary in her affairs. He visited Mary at Sheffield Manor, and she gave a list of instructions. He was thought to be involved in international intrigue to restore Mary to rule. He was detained by the Earl of Shrewsbury at Sheffield for a month. Ruisseau was then allowed to take some of Mary's requests to Elizabeth, who responded point by point. Letters from Mary in code, identified in the Bibliothèque nationale de France and newly deciphered in 2023 include her responses to these events.

Du Ruisseau looked after the finances of members of Mary's household in England. In January 1586, Mary wrote to the conspirator Thomas Morgan that Ruisseau would pay him 200 French crowns. On 20 March 1586, at Chartley, Jérôme Pasquier and Bastian Pagez witnessed a document in which Jacques Gervais, Mary's surgeon, placed his affairs in the hands of Jean Champhuon, sieur du Ruisseau. A note in an inventory of Mary's possessions at Chartley Castle in August 1586 mentions that Du Rousseau had recently sent a parcel of linen.

== Invasion plans ==
In September 1583, Mary arranged for Du Ruisseau to have an audience with the Duke of Guise to discuss possible plans in response to the Raid of Ruthven in Scotland. The pro-English coup had upset her scheme for an "association" with her son James VI. Possibilities included taking James VI to France and invading Scotland with 600 musketeers, possibly with papal funding. Mary envisaged a landing at Dumbarton Castle and the capture of Blackness Castle and Stirling Castle.
