= Albert Fontenay =

French servant of Mary, Queen of Scots and diplomat

Albert Fontenay or Fontaine was a French servant of Mary, Queen of Scots and acted as her diplomat in Scotland in 1584. Fontenay wrote a frequently cited description of the young James VI of Scotland. Some of his correspondence with Mary, Queen of Scots, was decipherered and published by Sheila R. Richards in 1974.

== French lawyers and secretaries and Mary's service ==
Albert Fontenay was a chancellor or chamberlain to Mary, and secretary of her council, an administrator of her estates and dowry lands in France. Mary's supporter James Beaton, the exiled Archbishop of Glasgow was a key figure in her French affairs. Fontenay was related to other lawyers working for Mary, and was frequently described as a half-brother or brother of Mary's secretary Claude Nau, who was a son of Sebastian Nau and Claire Regnault. Mary mentioned him a letter of 1 October 1584 "le frere de mon secretaire nommé Fontenoy", and Fontenay wrote to Claude Nau as "mon frére".

Claude Nau wrote to Fontenay as "Albert". Nau mentioned the death of a sister-in-law, "de Lespine" in 1585, the wife of their older brother. They had a cousin, "de Beauvois". Fontenay's family connections are mentioned in Mary's letters, but were misinterpreted by older writers and historians such as Agnes Strickland. Fontenay was identified as Claude Nau. It has also been suggested that Fontenay was a "uterine sibling" of Claude Nau, having the same mother, but this does not seem compatible with Claire Regnault's epitaph. Fontenay's family relationships with other members of Mary's council and secretariat are unclear.

Claude Nau mentions their older brother, whose wife, who died in 1584, was their sister-in-law "de Lespine". Jean Champhuon, sieur du Ruisseau, an advocate who married Claude Nau's sister Claire in 1563, was also in Mary's service, from 1575 as master of her (French) accounts, and his brother, Pierre de Champhuon, joined Mary's French council in 1584. Jehan Champhuon was promoted to be Mary's chancellor and keeper of her seals for French administration on 2 May 1585. Fontenay described Ruisseau's affection to their blood relatives of the surname Nau. On 4 January 1592, a courtier described as "Procureur Champhuon" was executed by hanging for conspiracy with Philippe Dallier, an usher of accounts, and a soldier called La Fontaine at a crossroads or in the old market place during the siege of Rouen.

== Fontenay in England and Spain ==
In August 1577, Claude Nau wrote from Sheffield Manor to his brother or brother-in-law about Mary's discontent with the services of Réné Dolu, a controller of her finances. During a recent visit to England, Dolu made several purchases for Mary in London, including confectionery, lemons for perfume, and a chess set. Nau hoped his relative would get Dolu's job and offered advice, but Dolu remained in post until 1581.

Fontenay visited Mary in England in October 1582 and she decided to send him as her diplomat to Spain. He mentioned in 1585 that he had bought valuable commodities in Spain including musk and civet for perfumes.

Fontenay later mentioned arriving with his brother-in-law, Jean de Champhuon, sieur du Ruisseau, to see Mary in England (in 1582) and finding she was out hunting. Du Ruisseau went to London and met Francis Walsingham. Some copies of Fontenay's letter have "Tutbury Castle" as the location, but this was probably a mistake made when Fontenay's letter was deciphered at Tutbury in January 1585 or an interpolation made by Thomas Phelippes. Fontenay wrote a symbol for the location.

Fontenay's letters show that he was aligned with English supporters of Mary, including Thomas Morgan and Charles Paget, and was mistrustful of James Beaton, Archbishop of Glasgow, Mary's primary diplomat in France. He complained that the Archbishop had not written to him while he was in Spain.

== Mission to Scotland in 1584 ==
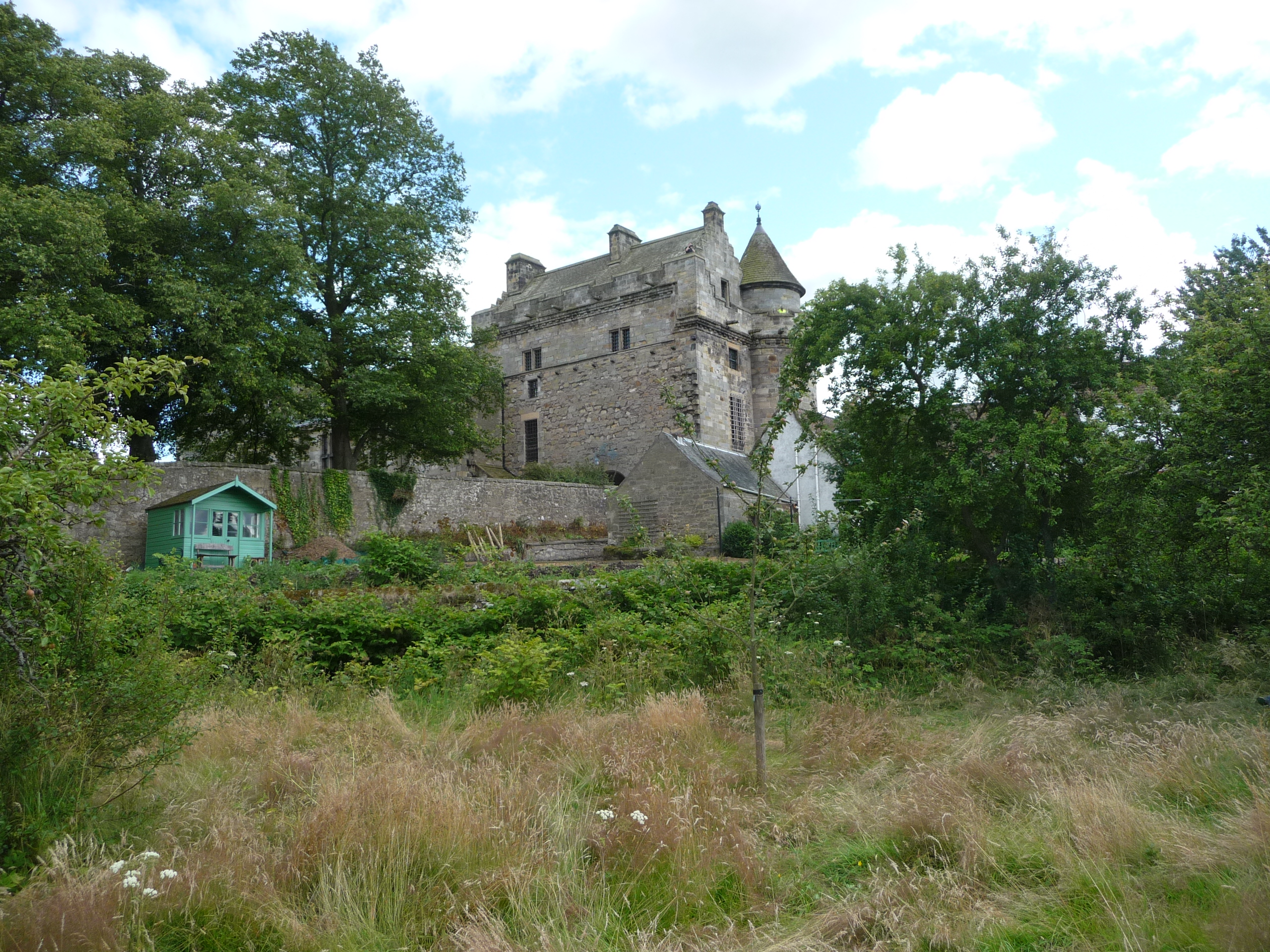
Fontenay visited James VI at Falkland Palace and wrote about the king's leisure activities.

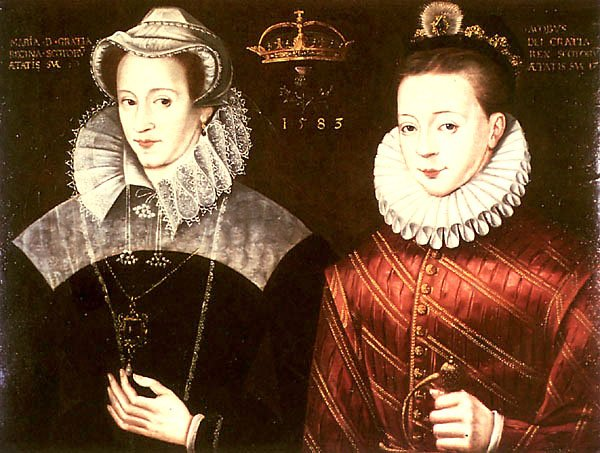
Mary, Queen of Scots and James VI, a double portrait made in 1583, possibly to promote the "association", Blair Castle

Fontenay travelled to Scotland as a diplomat for Mary in July 1584. At this time she was a prisoner in England at Wingfield Manor. He brought Mary's outlines and plans for her return to Scotland, perhaps even to become a joint ruler with her son. The scheme was known as the "association". Fontenay was optimistic about Mary's plans and opportunities, and in one letter wrote "jamais si belle", that the time was never so good as now.

Fontenay arrived at Leith on 4 July. A few days later he sent word to James VI who was at Falkland Palace, and the king sent James Stewart, 1st Lord Doune to meet him. An English diplomat in Edinburgh, William Davison, heard that he brought the king a sword, a gift from the Duke of Guise, and later discovered the gift was from Mary.

James VI welcomed Fontenay, invited him to Falkland and gave him access to the palace. Fontenay presented Mary's sword to James and they had a lighthearted discussion. James said he had been Mary's knight since he was in the cradle at Edinburgh Castle. Years later, an old servant Anthony Standen said he had been knighted by touching Mary's diamond cross on James' cradle clothes. James began to wear a diamond cross at the end of August, and perhaps his choice of jewellery was connected with these recollections and the idea of service to his mother.

On the first Saturday after he arrived, James lent Fontenay a horse, a courser, so that he could follow the hunt. James seemed to like hunting best and would spend six hours in the saddle. James said that he had tried to spend six days in a row looking at the royal accounts, but the effort made him unwell, and he compared his stamina to Spanish jennet, which he characterised as better for a "brave course" or gallop than long endurance. Fontenay thought that the Earl of Arran and the Master of Gray deliberately encouraged the king to pass his time in amusements and recreation, whilst Arran, the Earl of Montrose (who was at Falkland with Fontenay), and newly appointed Secretary Maitland wielded real power as a triumvirate.

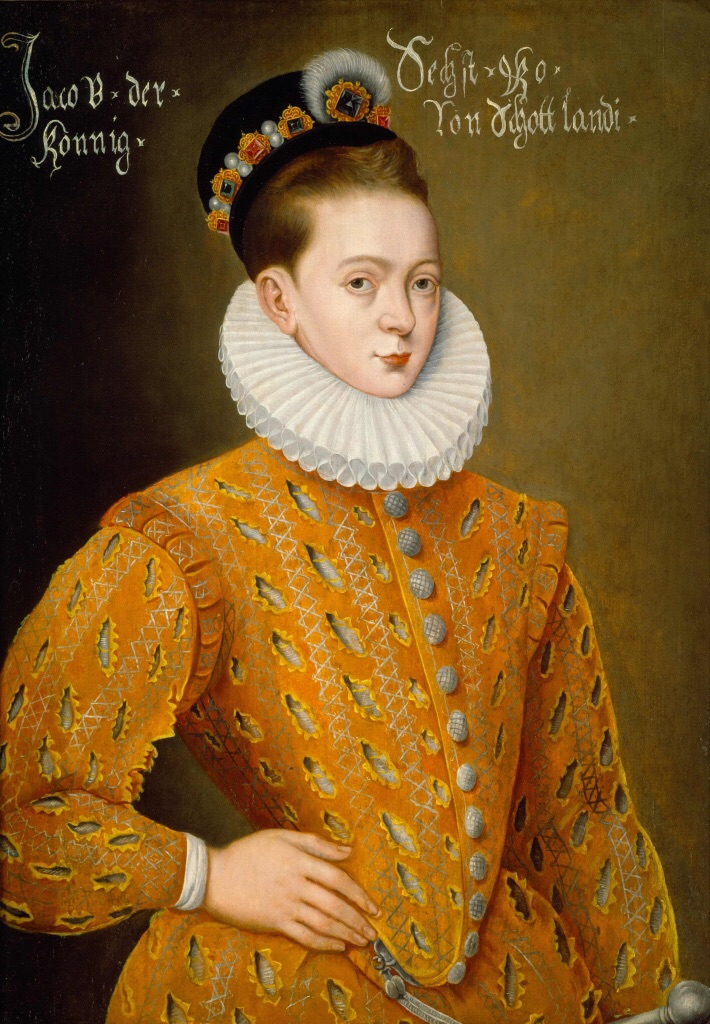
James VI enjoyed the company of Fontenay without engaging with the proposals he brought from his mother, Mary, Queen of Scots

=== A heart serves for the name of the king your son ===
James wrote in French (coded in cipher) to Mary on 23 July 1584, pleased to welcome Fontenay to Falkland, as one of the first envoys from his mother. He understood that Fontenay intended to broach the topic of their "perfect union and association" which he would "without fail immediately pass" after the return of Lord Seton from France. French policy was to support the "association" and James was not yet fully recognised as ruler. Fontenay was also to declare other secret matters in person. A note written in Fontenay's cipher alphabet says that James asked the writer to pen a heart symbol for his name.

=== The young old man ===
On 15 August, while staying with the court musician James Lauder in Edinburgh, Fontenay wrote (to Nau) that James VI was intelligent, perceptive, and well-educated. He was however timid and lacked courtly manners. He thought that James was as yet unaware of the comparative lack of wealth of the Scottish crown, that he had made bad choices in his favourite courtiers, and was more interested in hunting and pastime than his proper business. James was a "young old man", the original word order was "vieulx ieune homme", avoiding his political duty as if he heard the "sirens of Socrates". This was a reference to the education of Alcibiades from Plato's Symposium.

Fontenay thought the king was at risk, and reminded him of a story from French history, how the kings of the "race of Clovis" or Merovingian dynasty sent their spare heirs to be monks in monasteries. Fontenay was trying to persuade James to make an agreement with his mother. James later described seeing a letter of Mary to Fontenay, which suggested that if James failed to agree terms, and she regained power in Scotland, he would have only the Lordship of Darnley.

Fontenay's letters of August 15 were written in cipher and he mentions his difficulty with composing notes and a text for ciphering and his need for an assistant. The texts were deciphered for Claude Nau and Mary by Jérôme Pasquier. Nau wrote that the letter came to him via France, and there was a long delay before it was deciphered. Fontenay's description of the king is not accurate on every point. He wrote that James disliked and avoided the courtly arts of dance and music, but there are records of his dancing lessons with William Hudson, patronage of musicians, and the purchase of costumes and disguises for him to wear at dances and masques.

=== Building support for Mary ===
Fontenay was invited to a banquet at Edinburgh Castle with the English diplomat William Davison. The feast was hosted by the Earl and Countess of Arran. When Elizabeth Stewart, Countess of Arran asked him to attend, Fontenay claimed that the Scottish fare on the menu disagreed with him and he would get colic. This answer made James blush and smile. Fontenay included this story in an account of his negotiations which he later sent to Mary. He wrote that the Earl and Countess of Arran took every opportunity to convince James that Mary would displace him rather than form a partnership, actions which would frustrate his brother Nau's efforts in London in November. He thought they were concerned that if Mary were freed, she might marry and have another heir.

Fontenay met Agnes Keith, who was pleased to hear news from Mary. Fontenay liked her because she spoke of her love for Mary. However, Agnes Keith did not now hold much sway with the present regime in Scotland. He thought she would send the "Mademoiselle d'Orkenay" to join Mary's household in England, possibly meaning Mary Stewart, a daughter of Robert Stewart, 1st Earl of Orkney who married the Master of Gray in 1585. Fontenay asked Countess of Arran to help relieve Mary, offering her "liberal promises" of Mary's gratitude. He also met one of Mary's consistent allies, Margaret Fleming, Countess of Atholl.

Fontenay wrote of his discussions with Arran as if they were a farce, and he said that Mary's allies in Scotland like the "lord of Briquemault" found his tales of Arran very funny. Arran seemed to threaten him, then insist he take a gift of a diamond jewel. Fontenay gave Arran a skin of Spanish leather. James said he was waiting for a letter of Lord Seton before proceeding with the Association, as an excuse, and Fontenay felt his mission was becoming a failure.

When authorities in Edinburgh impounded Fontenay's luggage, suspected to contain Catholic books forbidden in Scotland, James ordered the return of the diplomat's "cofferis and guids". However, during his conversations with the king, Fontenay was surprised that James did not ask him anything about his mother's life in England, and it became clear that James and his advisors would not move to forward the "association", or support another plan mooted by Mary, which was to invade England with Spanish and French armies. James VI was not very enthusiastic about the plan, known as the "Enterprise of England". He worried that it would go ahead without offering any benefit to him.

== Mary's response ==
In England, Mary moved from Sheffield to Wingfield, on the way telling John Somers that she had her son's agreement in writing for her to "order him in all things" and saying she knew nothing about an enterprise. Her plan was to intimidate Elizabeth into accepting her wishes by creating fear. She explained her bluff to the Master of Gray, "Croyez pour certain, que il n'y a que seule crainte d'un extreme qui puisse amener la Royne d'Angleterre a faire pour nous", Believe for certain, that only extreme fear can drive the Queen of England to act for us.

Scottish news seemed slow to arrive at Wingfield. Mary wanted Claude Nau to go to London and meet Elizabeth I to discuss her position. She wrote to Fontenay on 28 September, asking him to recommend Claud Hamilton to James VI, and sent the articles of the association to John Maitland of Thirlestane. Nau was given permission to come to London in November and drew up a long list of bullet points for discussion.

Mary sent cipher keys or "alphabets" for Fontenay to give to John Maitland and other Scottish courtiers he had identified who might wish to write to her. As well as a degree of secrecy and security, the use of cipher was an indication of favour amongst supporters and allies. Mary assumed that Maitland would help build support for the "association".

== Fontenay and the Master of Gray ==
A Scottish courtier and diplomat, the Master of Gray, who was in London, became angry because Fontenay seemed to have shown the young King James VI a letter from Mary which said he was untrustworthy. Fontenay had also written to Mary about his distrust of Gray, who he believed betrayed Mary's correspondence to Elizabeth. Gray also heard that Fontenay had suggested to James VI that the French ambassador in London, Michel de Castelnau, was devoted to the service of Elizabeth I. Francis Walsingham heard about the quarrel in December 1584 despite some efforts to keep it quiet. Nau was in London in November but Gray would not work with him. Walsingham sent Nau's letters to Mary at Wingfield, with a note to Ralph Sadler describing the controversy:

There is great spite grown between the Mr of Gray and Nau. The cause thereof hath grown through certain ill offices done against the said Mr of Gray, by one "Le Fownteyne" brother to Nau, sent into Scotland by that Queen. There has been great travail and cunning used, to hide this disagreement between the said parties, but it would not be. I suppose that Nau does greatly complain of the Mr of Gray unto his Mistress in the letters which I now send.

Sadler thought Gray's quarrel might benefit Elizabeth, as she could mediate in any subsequent disagreement between James and Mary to her "honour and commodity". Mary was displeased with Gray, who she had thought acted for her, seeking to leverage better terms from Elizabeth, but was now working only for her son. According to Gray, Fontenay was asked to leave Scotland in January 1585, and before departing he declared that Gray had sworn to assassinate a leading Scottish courtier, James Stewart, Earl of Arran. Gray wrote to Elizabeth that Fontenay was a bigger liar than his brother Nau.

Elizabeth, informed by the Master of Gray and letters Archibald Douglas and from Scotland, knew there was no association treaty in progress between James and Mary. Ralph Sadler described Mary's reaction to this at the end of February as "greatly perplexed", since Nau had not heard this from Gray when he was London. She maintained in letters to Castelnau that Fontenay received some encouragement or solace (soulagement) in Scotland.

Fontenay did not leave Scotland in any kind of hurry. James gave him a letter for Mary near the end of February. Fontenay's departure was somehow delayed, and he wrote a letter Mary on 9 March 1584/5 which was critical of the "ambition and avarice" of the Earl and Countess of Arran. He wrote that the Countess had bewitched the king, on croit que sa femme l'a ensorcele. He warned Nau that a rumour was current at the Scottish court that Mary made him sleep with her (que sa majeste vous faisoit coucher avec elle), and so they should modify their familiar behaviour when the Master of Gray visited.

James gave Fontenay another parting letter in similar terms at Holyrood Palace on 15 March 1585. James VI sent Lord Doune to Fontenay with a parting gift, a gilt engraved silver cup, which he refused as a point of honour.

After Fontenay had left Scotland for France, Lady Margaret Fleming (the Countess of Atholl), wrote to Mary on 31 March 1585. She thanked Mary for the letter he had brought, and wrote that she and her daughter Mary (later Countess of Atholl) remained at the queen's service. She said that Fontenay was "altogether your and faithful servitor, and good friend to all that favour your grace's service". She thought he had not been recompensed in Scotland according to his merit but "wanted no good will of me". When Mary told her jailer Amias Powlet that Fontenay's reports of her son had pleased her, he told her to wait for more certain news from James himself.

The Master of Gray retained several documents from this period, and in September 1596 he sent details of the Association, a letter from Fontenay to James VI, and the articles of Fontenay's negotiation to the Secretary, John Lindsay of Balcarres.

== Mary's supporters and conspirators ==
Fontenay had sent a box or coffer to Paris from Scotland, and after some delay, his brother-in-law, Jean de Champhuon, sieur du Ruisseau, discovered a secret compartment with letters (alleged to be) from James VI to Mary and her allies. Thomas Morgan wrote to Mary with news of the discovery. Morgan's letter was intercepted and deciphered by Thomas Phelippes.

Morgan wanted money and Gilbert Curle, another of Mary's secretaries, wrote that Fontenay would have given Morgan his clerical income as a Prebend of Saint-Quentin, but Fontenay had already disposed it elsewhere. The income may have been a gift from Mary. His connection to Saint-Quentin was perhaps the basis of his remark to James VI about the race of Clovis and monks. Mary gave this prebend, or perhaps another similar award, to Gilbert Gifford. She had been asked by Henry III of France to give a prebend of St Quentin to the Sieur de Saint-Prix in July 1582.

Fontenay wrote to Mary from Paris at the end of March concerning Jean Arnault, a suspected double agent. He wrote again, later in 1585, asking if letters addressed to her at Wingfield in January carried by Antony Rolston via the house of Anthony Babington had arrived. They including five pages of cipher describing Scottish politics. Before leaving Scotland he entrusted some letters to a servant of Janet Scott, Lady Fernihirst.

Fontenay made plans to marry the eldest daughter of Monsieur Masuyer, who was a relation of his mother, Claire Regnault. Since 1583, he had held her in great affection. Masuyer was a well-connected lawyer in Paris, and a friend of Ruisseau. Ruisseau and Claire Nau were in favour of the match.

Claude Nau advised Fontenay to avoid factions in France and only speak well of James VI. He wrote about buying a suitable wedding present. On 29 July 1585, Claude Nau wrote to him that he had divorced or had his betrothal to "P" (Elizabeth Pierrepont) annulled, which would help his career. A letter from the French ambassador in London, possibly around this time, mentioned that Fontenay had abandoned efforts to join Mary's service in England and had obtained employment in France.

Thomas Morgan introduced Fontenay to Charles Paget and they met Claud Hamilton in Paris in January 1586, before his return to Scotland. Fontenay gave Hamilton a cipher alphabet. Morgan thought that Alexander Seton might be a better advocate for Mary in Scotland than Hamilton. In a ciphered letter of April 1586 to Mary, Queen of Scots, Albert Fontenay mentioned Alexander Seton, "Monsieur le prieur de Seton", and his brother John Seton, "le chevalier maistre d'hostel du roy", as her Catholic allies in Scotland.

Paget wrote to Mary and Nau, mentioning Fontenay's "great comfort and friendship" and his "many friendly offices". Mary wished Fontenay to keep her informed of the management of her dowry, and to write to her frequently. She agreed not to use him in her affairs of state but in her private and secret courses.

In May 1586, Gilbert Curle wrote to Paget that Fontenay was at his service. Claude Nau wrote to Francis Englefield in July 1586. He mentioned his brother Fontenay, and explained that he had not recently been active in Mary's service as diplomat. After his mission in Scotland, consideration of Fontenay's previous visit to Spain had aroused the suspicions of Henry III of France, so he was constrained to abstain himself from foreign negotiations. Paget wrote that Fontenay had been discouraged in his service to Mary by some actions of the Archbishop of Glasgow.

Mary asked the French ambassador in London, Michel de Castelnau, to try and get permission for Fontenay to serve her in England at Tutbury Castle in August 1586. She seems to have trusted Fontenay more than other members of her secretariat. After receiving her death sentence in November 1586, she lamented his absence, and blamed Nau and Pasquier for retaining her papers and betraying her secrets when they were arrested. She wrote to Bernardino de Mendoza that Fontenay was a young man of strong resolve and knowledgeable, "il est un jeune homme de fort resolution et science". She made a will leaving Fontenay a pension which had previously been paid to Willie Douglas.

The "Enterprise of England" was realised as the Spanish Armada in 1588.
