= Jérôme Pasquier =

French servant of Mary, Queen of Scots and courtier

Jérôme Pasquier (1560–1605) was a French servant of Mary, Queen of Scots, involved in writing and deciphering coded letters.

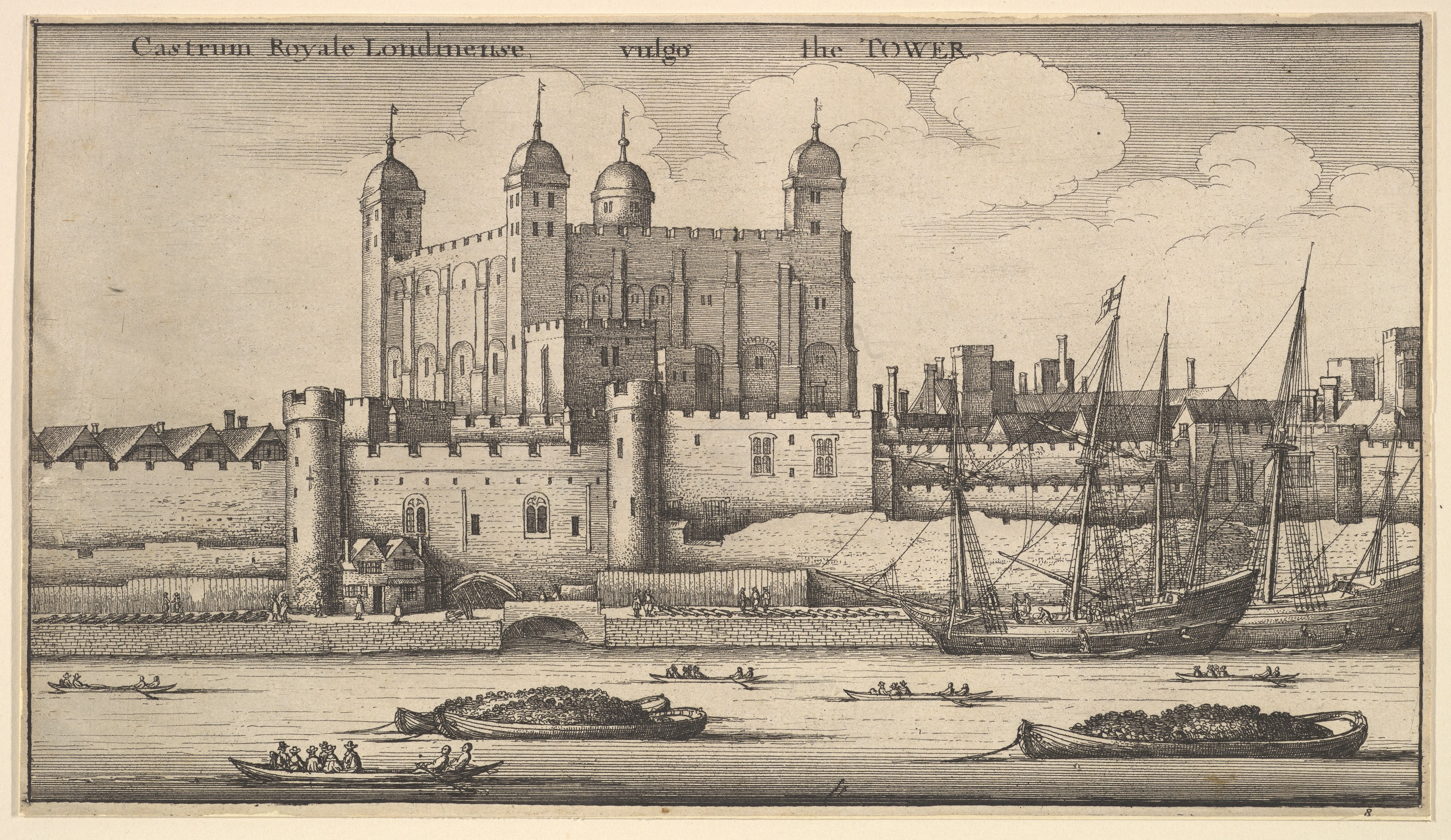
Pasquier was taken to the Tower of London and interviewed about his secretarial work

== Working for a captive queen ==
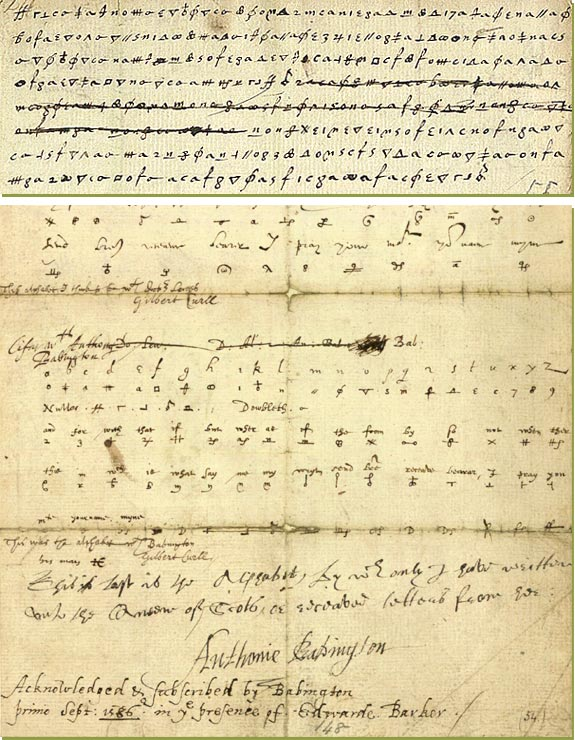
Cipher key from the Babington Plot

Pasquier is recorded as a groom of the chamber to Mary and master of her wardrobe. The other grooms were Bastian Pagez and Hannibal Stuart. He was described as "young Pasquier". Adam Blackwood described him as "commis et argentier", a clerk and treasurer or purse keeper. The French ambassador also called him a steward or argentier. Pasquier may have been recruited to Mary's service by Albert Fontenay, a brother of Mary's secretary Claude Nau. Fontenay mentioned his friends, Monsieur de l'Aubespine, Arnault, and Pasquier.

Pasquier married Madeleine Champhoun, a daughter of Mary's French administrator Jean Champhuon, sieur du Ruisseau and Claude Nau's sister Claire. On 20 March 1586, at Chartley, Pasquier and Bastian Pagez witnessed a document in which Jacques Gervais, Mary's surgeon, placed his affairs in the hands du Ruisseau.

Pasquier worked with Mary's secretaries Claude Nau and Gilbert Curle managing Mary's correspondence. Letters in cipher from the French ambassador London, Guillaume de l'Aubespine de Châteauneuf, were delivered to him. In May 1586, Mary said, and Gilbert Curle wrote, that she received an infinite number of letters in cipher. Curle translated Mary's French drafts or dictation into English and ciphered them. Nau was in charge of the French correspondence.

In August 1584 Pasquier worked on the deciphering of a long letter to Mary and Claude Nau from Albert Fontenay, a half-brother of Nau, which describes his visit to Scotland and negotiations with James VI. The letter describes the young king and his hobbies and has become an important source for his biography. Pasquier also deciphered Fontenay's despatch of 24 November 1584 which includes the views of James VI on the "Enterprise of England", a plan to make an allegiance with Spain to invade England. Pasquier deciphered a letter to Mary in Spanish from Alexander Farnese, Duke of Parma in 1585.

Pasquier may have accompanied Nau to London in November 1584 when Nau acted as Mary's diplomat. They borrowed money from other members of the household. Pasquier said that he had first heard some details of the Throckmorton Plot (months after the events) during Nau's trip. In June 1586, Nau sent Pasquier to Amias Paulet to complain that Mary's letters ought to be sent when they were ready and not depend on the opportunity of a bearer to take them. Nau was concerned about letters relating to Bess Pierrepont.

In August 1571, before Pasquier joined her service, Mary mentioned her practice of writing cipher in a letter to the Archbishop of Glasgow. Outgoing cipher letters were composed from drafts (les minutes de chifres), but for reasons of security these drafts were usually burnt. Letters could be taken on the way, or her papers and coffers might be subject to a surprise search. She did not always keep or have time to make fair copies or "doubles" of the ciphered letters.

== Arrested and questioned ==
As the Babington Plot was investigated and revealed by Francis Walsingham, Pasquier was arrested on August 1586 with Mary's secretaries at the suggestion of Amias Paulet, who observed he was "half a secretary". He was first locked in a chamber, then was moved to the house of Mr Littleton and the lodging of Thomas Gresley of Drakelow at Chartley. Walsingham told Paulet to send Pasquier to London under "sure guard". Paulet arranged for him to be taken to the Tower of London on 29 August escorted by three men. French diplomats in London heard a rumour the prisoner taken to the Tower was Bess Pierrepont, or Mary herself. This was not unprecedented, ten years before, in February 1575, a French diplomat heard that one of Mary's cipher clerks or messengers, a young man, had been taken to the Tower of London.

Pasquier was questioned by Owen Hopton, Edward Barker, and the code expert Thomas Phelippes twice in September 1586. They showed him some examples of his code work. His responses are recorded in three surviving documents. Pasquier confessed to writing and transcribing coded letters for Mary. He said that Nau was in charge of the cipher keys or alphabets. The cipher work took place in Nau's chamber. Pasquier delivered completed ciphered and deciphered letters to Mary or Nau. He claimed not to remember the contents of the letters. He did remember encoding a letter in cipher for Mary in 1584 to send to the French ambassador Michel de Castelnau asking him to negotiate a pardon for Francis Throckmorton after his treason trial.

William Cecil wrote to Christopher Hatton discussing the idea of threatening Nau, Curle, and Pasquier so they would confirm Mary's crime and ensure their own escape. Claude Nau mentioned that some significant letters, copied in French and English, were kept in chests belonging to Pasquier. One way of making a case against Mary was to find incriminating and treasonous material in her letters, but her distance from the material in cipher produced by her secretaries was a problem. Mary was able to deny writing to Anthony Babington with her own signature, and question the authenticity of any letters produced. Conyers Read argues that the secretaries were interviewed to demonstrate the genuineness of deciphered letters and that Mary was the author of her letters.

Walsingham sent news to the Scottish Court in September 1586 that Mary was to be moved to Fotheringhay, and that "the matters whereof she is guilty are already so plain and manifest (being also confessed by her two secretaries), as it is thought, they shall required no long debating".

=== Pasquier's confession ===
Pasquier signed a confession on 8 October 1586. He was described as Mary's "argentier". He related that he ciphered and deciphered letters, including to the Archbishop of Glasgow, to Albert Fontenay, Thomas Morgan, and to the French ambassadors in London, Castelnau and Châteauneuf. Nau gave Pasquier drafts or "minutes" of the letters that he had written. He knew little about the origins of the "Enterprise", a plan for Mary's Spanish or French allies to invade England and depose Elizabeth, but said that it was indefinitely postponed by changing political circumstances. He thought that Mary was averse to plans to invade England, considering that she might have to renounce her claim to the throne in favour of her son James VI.

=== Pasquier and the evidence for Mary's secretariat presented at her trial ===
Pasquier's evidence does not seem to have been directly used in Mary's treason trial. Walsingham and Phelippes focused on a letter sent to Babington written by Nau, the "bloody letter", and a cipher used to write to him found in her papers. Phelippes acknowledged that Mary usually sent more letters every fortnight "than it was possible for one body well exercised therein to put in cipher and decipher".

Pasquier had a lesser role in Mary's correspondence than Nau and Curle, coding the minutes prepared by Nau or deciphering incoming letters. In a draft for the proceedings at Mary's trial, William Cecil and others suggested relating how Mary directed the writing of her coded letters in English, by dictating them to Nau in French in her cabinet, and having Curle translate them into English for ciphering. This process, which was described by Curle and by Nau's confession, was a branch of correspondence that Paquier was not necessarily involved in, and he was not mentioned.

=== Pasquier and historians ===
The historian Conyers Read thought Pasquier was a minor figure in the intrigues leading to her execution. Leo Hicks highlighted details in Pasquier's 1586 confessions which appear to shed light on Mary's policy, particularly noting her opposition to French invasion schemes which might prejudice her son's inheritance of the English crown.

== After Mary's trial ==
French diplomats thought Mary might escape execution. Guillaume de l'Aubespine de Châteauneuf thought Pasquier would be released and would return to Mary, and tell her of the efforts of Pomponne de Bellièvre on her behalf. Then Pasquier could advise Mary to write apologetic letters to Elizabeth. However, Mary was executed on 8 February 1587 and Pasquier remained in custody.

Pasquier remained responsible for some household accounts and a distribution of cloth for livery clothes in Mary's household. He wrote to Phelippes in January 1587, concerning these financial matters. According to Adam Blackwood, who was informed by the account of Dominique Bourgoing, Mary came to distrust Pasquier and Nau, assuming that they had betrayed her. She cut them out of her will, and included a note of her concern about money received by Pasquier. Mary wrote from Fotheringhay to the Spanish diplomat Bernardino de Mendoza of her fear that they had hastened her death.

Pasquier and the two secretaries were released in August 1587 after Mary's funeral and given passports to return home. Pasquier carried a letter from the French ambassador in London, Guillaume de l'Aubespine de Châteauneuf, to Henry III of France which included a short description of the funeral at Peterborough.
