= Bastian Pagez =

French servant and musician

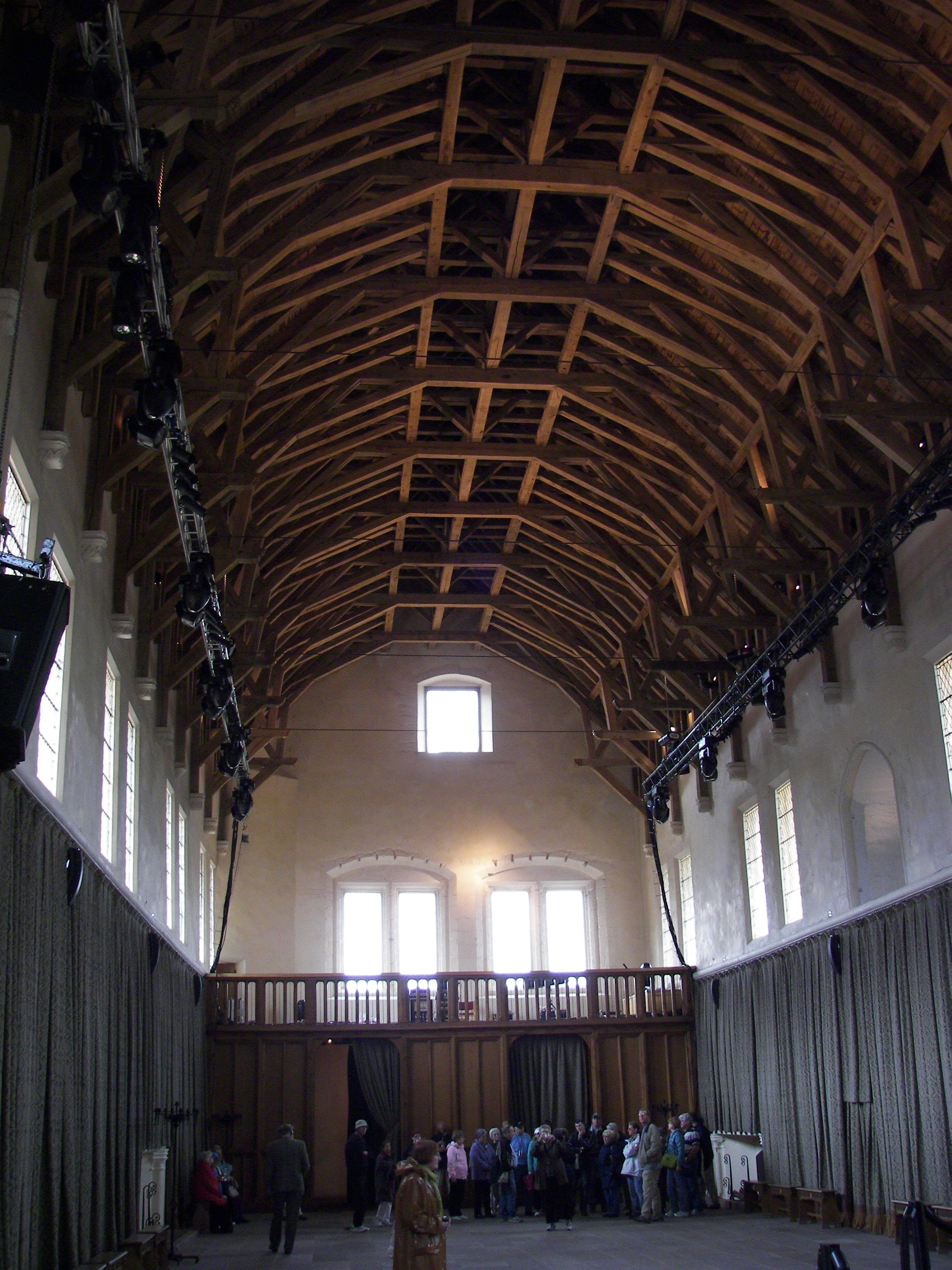
Bastian's entertainment in the Great Hall at Stirling Castle caused a diplomatic incident

Bastian Pagez was a French servant and musician at the court of Mary, Queen of Scots. He was born in Auvergne. He devised part of the entertainment at the baptism of Prince James at Stirling Castle in 1566. When Mary was exiled in England, Bastian and his family continued in her service. The 19th-century historians Agnes Strickland and William Barclay Turnbull considered his court role as equivalent to the English Master of the Revels; in England he was Mary's chamber valet and designed her embroidery patterns.

== Christening at Stirling ==
Bastian is first recorded at the Scottish court in 1565 when Mary and Henry Stewart, Lord Darnley bought him an elaborate and expensive suit of clothes costing over £100 Scots as a mark of their favour. James Melville of Halhill wrote in his Memoirs that Bastian was responsible for an entertainment in the Great Hall of Stirling Castle which offended the English guests at the baptism of the future James VI.

Mary and thirty guests sat at a round table like King Arthur's at the head of the hall. The courses of the dinner were brought up the hall on a moving table, with twelve men dressed as satyrs, with long tails, carrying lighted torches. In their other hand the satyrs carried whips to clear the way in front. When the table reached the stage, the satyrs passed their torches to bystanders. Then six servers dressed as nymphs who had been seated on the moving table, passed the food to the satyrs, who brought the dishes up to the round table on the stage. Meanwhile, the nymphs and satyrs sang Latin verses specially written by George Buchanan in honour of the food and hosts as the Rustic gods bringing gifts to James and his mother. Parts of the song were given to the satyrs, nereids, fauns, and naiads who alternately addressed the Queen and Prince, and it was concluded by characters representing the Orkney Islands.

Although the choreography was perfect, when the satyrs first wagged their tails, the Englishmen took it as reference to an old saying that Englishmen had tails. This story of English tails was first set down in the Middle Ages by the chronicle writers William of Malmesbury, Wace, and Layamon in his Brut. The origin was a legend that Saint Austin cursed the Kentish men of Rochester to have rayfish tails, and afterwards they were called muggles. Polydore Vergil had published a more current version of the ancient legend, writing that the curse applied to the descendants of people from Strood who had cut off the tail of Thomas Becket's horse. From this ancient story it had become proverbial in Europe that all Englishmen had secret tails. A few years later, George Buchanan mentioned the legend of the Kentish men in a friendly letter to Thomas Randolph.

James Melville criticised the diplomacy of the English guests for taking offence, saying they should have pretended not to see the joke. Some of the English guests, including Christopher Hatton, sat down behind the high table to face away from the spectacle, and the Queen and the English ambassador, the Earl of Bedford had to smooth things over. Melville said that Hatton told him he would have stabbed Bastian for the offence, done because Mary, for once, showed more favour to Englishmen rather than the French.

The supper with courses served by satyrs was on the 19 December 1566, two days after the baptism of the Prince, according to an English journal of the event. The moving table or stage was drawn up the hall four times for four courses, led by the satyrs. Each time its decorative theme was renewed. It broke during the fifth course. Amongst other payments, the royal accounts record that on 6 December Bastian was given 40 ells of "taffeteis of cord" in three colours to be "some "preparatives" for the baptism. "Preparatives" here may mean "harbingers," the role of the satyrs at the feast, but may just mean the preparations in general. Agnes Strickland compared this order for taffeta with John Forster's report in September of outfits in red, blue, and green for the Earls of Moray, Argyll and Bothwell, but Anne of Denmark ordered a comparable amount of taffeta, 48 ells in various colours, for a masque performed in September 1591. The decoration of the Great Hall was in part the responsibility of Mary's wardrobe servant Servais de Condé.

The detail of the other formal banquet on the day of baptism was described in the chronicle called the Diurnal of Occurrents. On the day of the banquet with satyrs, there had been fireworks directed by John Chisholm and the gunners Charles Bordeaux and James Hector with a pageant consisting of an assault on a mock castle by wildmen. The 28 wildmen dressed in goats-skin were fought by fifteen soldiers dressed as landsknechts, moors, and devils, armed with two cannons. James's father, Lord Darnley, was estranged from the Queen. He stayed privately in the castle, and the French ambassador Monsieur du Croc was instructed not to speak to him by Charles IX. On the day of the baptism du Croc sent a message to Darnley that if he came to his room, he would exit by the other door.

On the night of the murder of Lord Darnley, Mary left Darnley's bedside to attend a dance for Bastian's marriage to Christily Hogg. While some contemporary polemicists and previous writers had considered it surprising that she left the Kirk o'Field lodging to attend a servant's wedding, the historian Michael Lynch noted that she left to attend celebrations that were, "not those of an obscure servant but of the architect of the Stirling triumph". As the biographer Antonia Fraser put it, his masque was of special importance to Mary, "in view of the fact that he had designed one for her only six weeks previously."

== Bastian's wedding masque ==
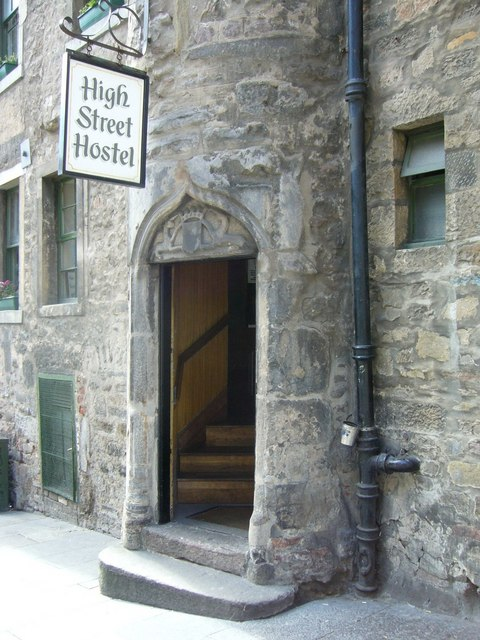
Regent Morton's House, on Blackfriars Street, Edinburgh, where Mary, Queen of Scots passed by torchlight to Bastian's wedding, 9 February 1567

Mary, Queen of Scots attended Bastian's wedding dance on 9 February 1567, a "banquet and masque", the night before the murder of Darnley at the Kirk o' Field lodging. On the 8 February she gave him black satin cloth for his wife's marriage gown. George Buchanan, who calls him Sebastian, one of the queen's musicians or singers, says that Mary left the wedding to meet Darnley but returned to Holyroodhouse to join the dance and follow the custom of putting the bride to bed. It was said she wore male costume for the wedding masque, "which apparel she loved oftentimes to be in, in dancings secretly with the King her husband, and going in masks by night through the streets". The confessions of accomplices to the King's murder mention the torchlit procession of the Queen's retinue passing back down Blackfriar's Wynd to the wedding, which has become part of the enduring imagery of the night.

After the Earl of Bothwell was accused of Darnley's murder, on 19 February 1567 a number of the queen's French servants crossed the border to Berwick upon Tweed in England. Only "Sebastian" was named by the Governor of Berwick, William Drury, who noted they were all, except their single Scottish escort, wearing "Ilande wede." An anonymous written accusation of Bothwell fixed on the door of Edinburgh's Tolbooth on the same day demanded the arrest of Bastian and Joseph Rizzio, the brother of David Rizzio. At the trial of Bothwell on 12 April 1567, a letter from Darnley's father, the Earl of Lennox, was submitted, which named Bastian, Joseph, the Italian courtier Francisco de Busso, and Charles Bordeaux, the French gunner who directed the fireworks at the baptism, as suspects who should be arrested. Bothwell was acquitted, and nothing was done with Lennox's list.

Bastian married Christily or Christine Hogg, and her name was recorded in the parish register of Holyroodhouse and Canongate and only a few years later in England. The parish register entry, which is dated later in the year, records the marriage was celebrated in the Queen's House. Bastian's wife was listed as a "femme de chambre" (a chamberer) in a roll of Mary's household.

== Messenger to London and Paris ==
On 26 February 1567, Bastian arrived in London with Mary's French financial comptroller, Monsieur Dolu, and went to the Scottish ambassador, Robert Melville of Murdocairney. Bastian carried a letter from Mary to Queen Elizabeth which he gave to Lord Burghley in person. The Spanish ambassador in London identified Bastian as the "groom who married the night following the death of King" and reported that this letter consisted of Mary's lamentations for troubles and her wish not to be calumniated in England by rumours of her involvement in the murder. Bastian then went with Dolu to Dieppe in March 1567.

The "young French varlet of the Scots queen" arrived in Paris on 4 March, identified by the historian John Hungerford Pollen as Bastian. He brought a letter from Mary written in Scots for Vincenzo Laureo, Bishop of Mondovì and nuncio for Scotland. The bishop found only one new detail in the letter, that one of Darnley's ribs was found to be broken. (The significance to Mary was the controversy over the cause of his death.) Neither of these letters carried by Dolu or Bastian survive, but they probably carried the letter written by Mary at Seton Palace on 18 February to the Archbishop of Glasgow in Paris. Bastian returned to Scotland and was later arrested by the King's party the day after the Battle of Carberry Hill on 16 June 1567.

== Bastian and his family in England ==
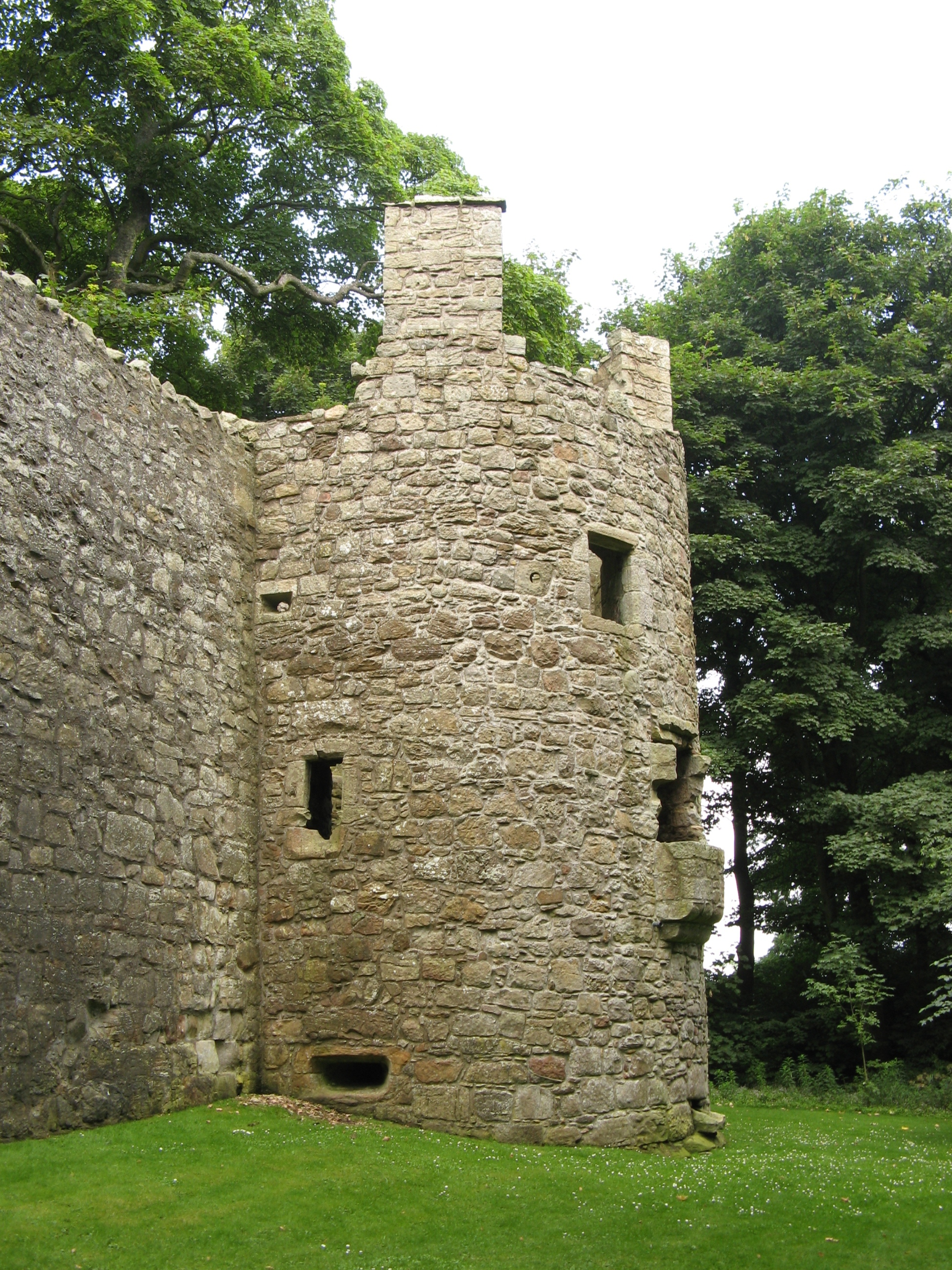
Mary requested Bastian to help her pass time at Lochleven Castle

Bastian and his family followed Mary into exile in England after her defeat at the Battle of Langside. Before he left Scotland, the new ruler, the Regent Moray, paid "Sebastian Padges Frenchman" £40 Scots. Mary had requested that Bastian join her at Lochleven Castle in July 1567, the English ambassador Nicholas Throckmorton noted that she had asked the Lords for, "an imbroiderer to draw forth suche work as she would be occupied about."

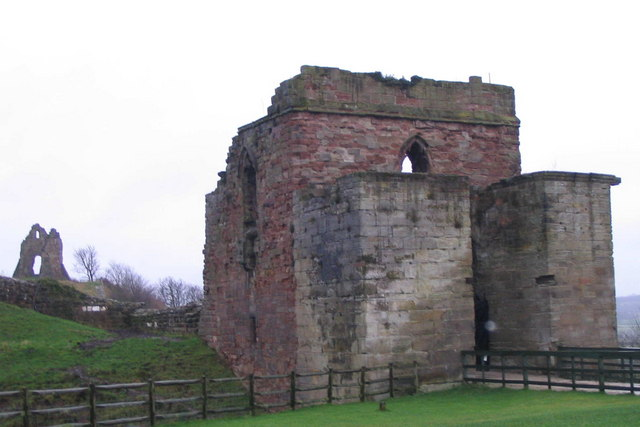
Tutbury Castle, the prison of Bastian and Christine in England

Bastian and Christine Hogg were listed in Mary's household at Tutbury Castle in October 1569 and at Sheffield on 3 May 1571.

Mary wrote to John Lesley, Bishop of Ross, from Sheffield Castle in September saying she had to give up some servants, but Bastian was deemed necessary. Bastian's inventions for her needlework were her first solace after her books, and she had requested that he and his wife join her from Scotland. They served her well and faithfully, but had children and no support, and his friends offered him advancement in France. She hoped the bishop could get him some French appointment to give him the financial security to stay with her. Mary wrote a similar letter on 12 August 1585 on behalf of another embroiderer, Pierre Oudry.

Although Mary's needlework may seem a hobby, the historian Michael Bath notes one of her needlework emblems on a pillow was cited in the trial of the Duke of Norfolk in 1571 after the Ridolfi plot that would have set Mary on the English throne as the culmination of the Northern Rebellion. Bastian was later alleged to have been involved in the plot to free Mary.

=== Secret and coded letters ===
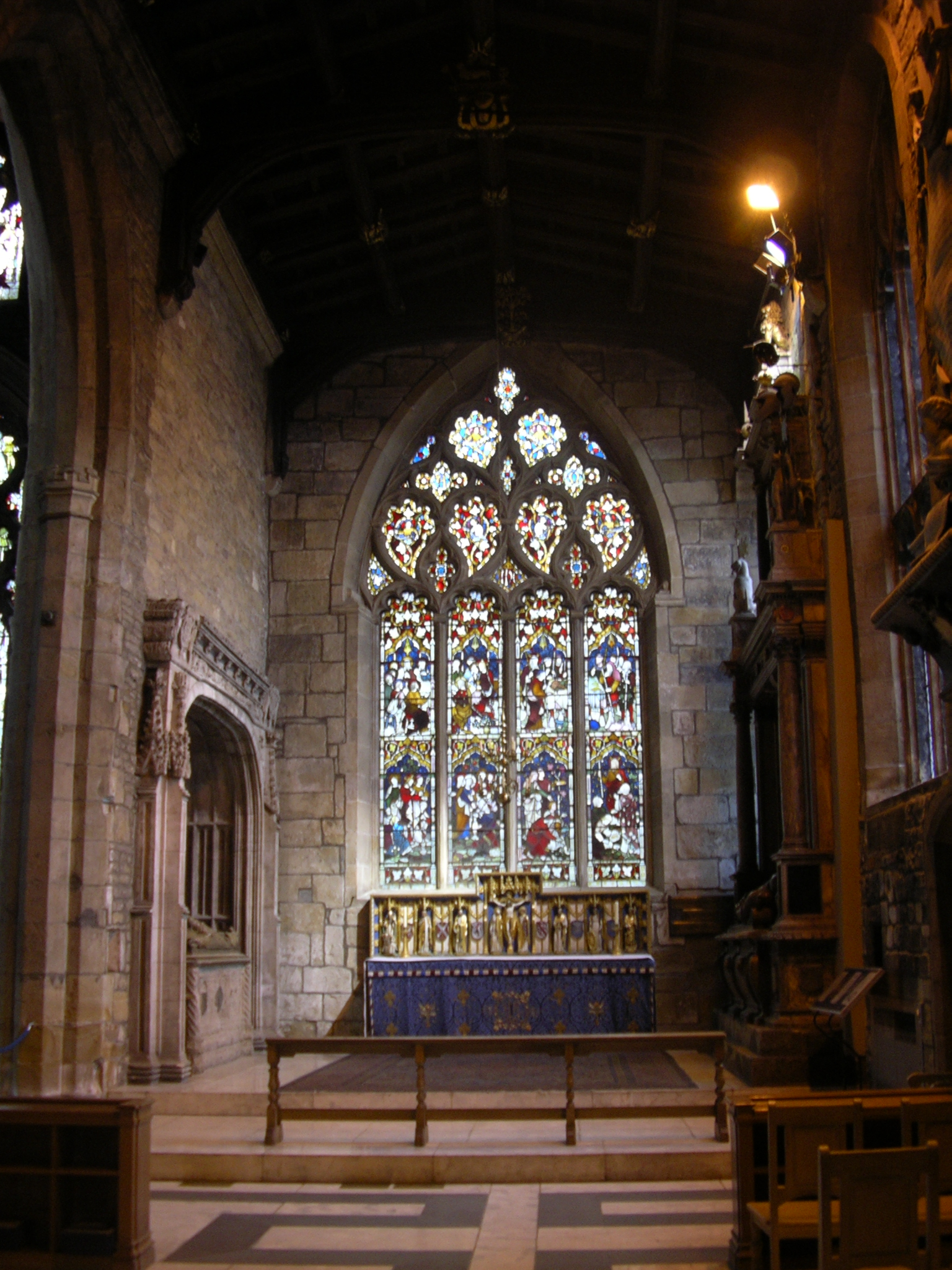
Bastian delivered Mary's letters in "Paul's Church", now Sheffield Cathedral.

In November 1571, the Earl of Shrewsbury discovered that Bastian had tried to send letters in cipher from Mary to the French ambassador. Bastian had been picking up the ambassador's letters from Nicolas, an Englishman employed as an interpreter, in St Paul's Church in Sheffield. Shrewsbury asked Lord Burghley if he should take any action regarding Bastian. Regent Morton discovered in 1574 that Christine Hogg's mother in Edinburgh was involved in Mary's secret correspondence via the Earl of Shrewsbury's Scottish schoolmaster, Alexander Hamilton.

Bastian's involvement in Mary's secret correspondence was noted again in 1575, and in 1580 he sent a cipher key to one of his relations. Mary asked for horses in December 1581 for four unarmed riders, including Bastian, to accompany her excursions by coach. The other suggested riders, the secretaries Claude Nau and Gilbert Curll, and her master of household Andrew Melville had also been mentioned with Bastian in connection with secret letters. In November 1584, Bastian travelled as far as Nottingham, accompanying Claude Nau, who was going to London to meet with Elizabeth and with the Scottish ambassador, the Master of Gray. On the way, they visited the annual horse-fair at Lenton, where their apparent liberty raised eyebrows.

=== Children of the captivity ===
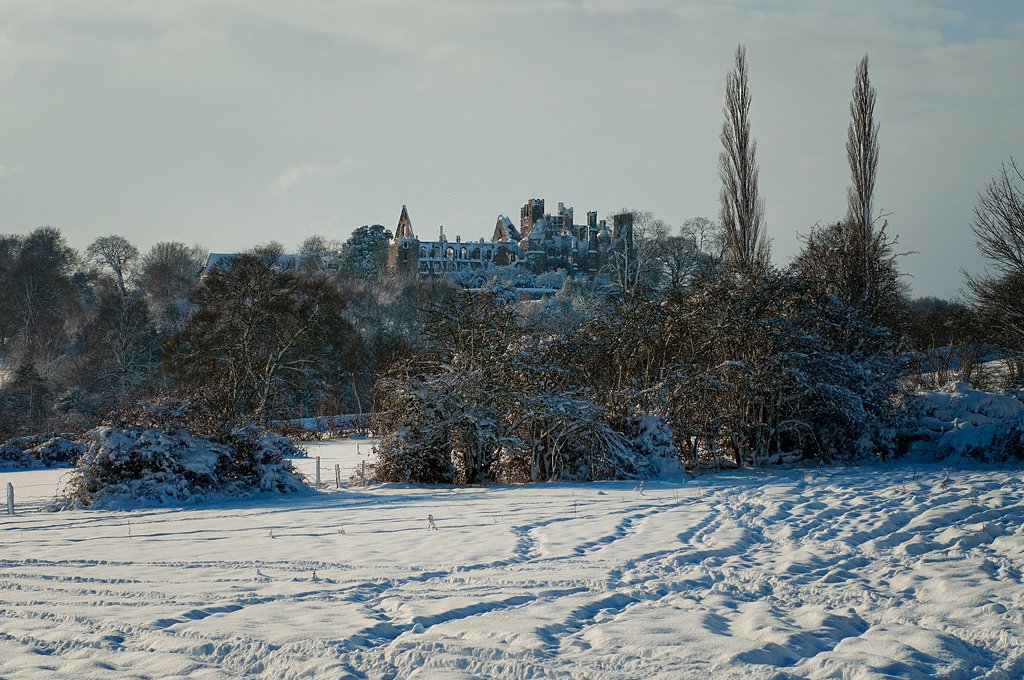
In 1569, Mary, Queen of Scots planned to escape from Wingfield Manor dressed as Bastian's wife's midwife

For a time in 1578, Christine Hogg and her eldest daughter left Mary's household, and Walsingham prevented her return. By August 1587, Bastian and Christine had two daughters, Mary and Elizabeth, sons David and Jacques, and five younger children whose names were not recorded. David, the eldest son, left the Queen's household, which was called her family, in May 1571. One child was born at Wingfield Manor in November 1569 at the time of the Northern rebellion. Later, the Earl of Shrewsbury wrote that Mary Queen of Scots had planned to escape after the birth, dressed as Christine's midwife. The midwife's part would have been played by Anne Somerset, Countess of Northumberland because they were "something like in personage". The Northumberlands were staying at nearby Wentworth House. The Countess of Northumberland rode north to join the rebellion. On 17 November 1569 she was at Brockenborough near Boroughbridge. The Elizabethan writer William Camden attributed an escape plan from Wingfield at this time to Leonard Dacre. Other, simpler, escape plans involved Mary exiting from a window with a couple of servants.

When Mary Queen of Scots was to be moved to Tutbury Castle in November 1584, it was suggested the children in the household should be sent away. Ralph Sadler wrote to Francis Walsingham, asking that the families should not be split up, as Christily was a necessary person who the captive Queen could not spare. Bastian was lodged in a free-standing building with Pierre Oudry, another embroiderer and Marmaduke Dorrel, an English officer of household, within the castle courtyard, separate from Mary's lodging. Mary thought her embroiderer's family were to leave in September 1585. It was planned that Christine and her daughters Mary and Elizabeth, would be removed from the household in January 1586, and Bastian was likely to be removed because, although he was thought useful to the Queen, he would not stay without his family. However, Bastian and his family remained with Mary at Chartley, probably because Christine was pregnant, and she had her child at Eastertime. The Queen's jailor, Amias Paulet, wrote to Francis Walsingham about the caution he would use employing midwives.

Mary wrote on 12 August 1585 to the French ambassador in London, Michel de Castelnau. She asked him for a passport for her "brodeur" and his family who were happy enough to return to France where they would be better off than with her. Two less well qualified "garçon" embroiderers could serve her well enough. This letter referred to her other embroiderer, Pierre Oudrie, who had a wife and five children. Mary's jailer Amias Paulet was worried that Oudrie's wife was a "women of judgement and understanding" who might become a "dangerous messenger" for Mary. Six months later she became troubled by mental illness and had to be restrained. Pierre Oudrie had been an embroiderer for the queen in Scotland since 1562. Another embroiderer, Charles Pluvart, and Bastian and his family would remain with the Scottish queen to the end.

On 20 March 1586, at Chartley, Bastian Pagez and another groom of the chamber, Jérôme Pasquier, witnessed a document in which Jacques Gervais, Mary's surgeon, placed his affairs in the hands of Jean Champhuon, sieur du Ruisseau, a brother-in-law of Mary's French secretary Claude Nau. Ruisseau was an administrator of Mary, Queen of Scots' French estates.

=== Bastian and the Babington plot ===
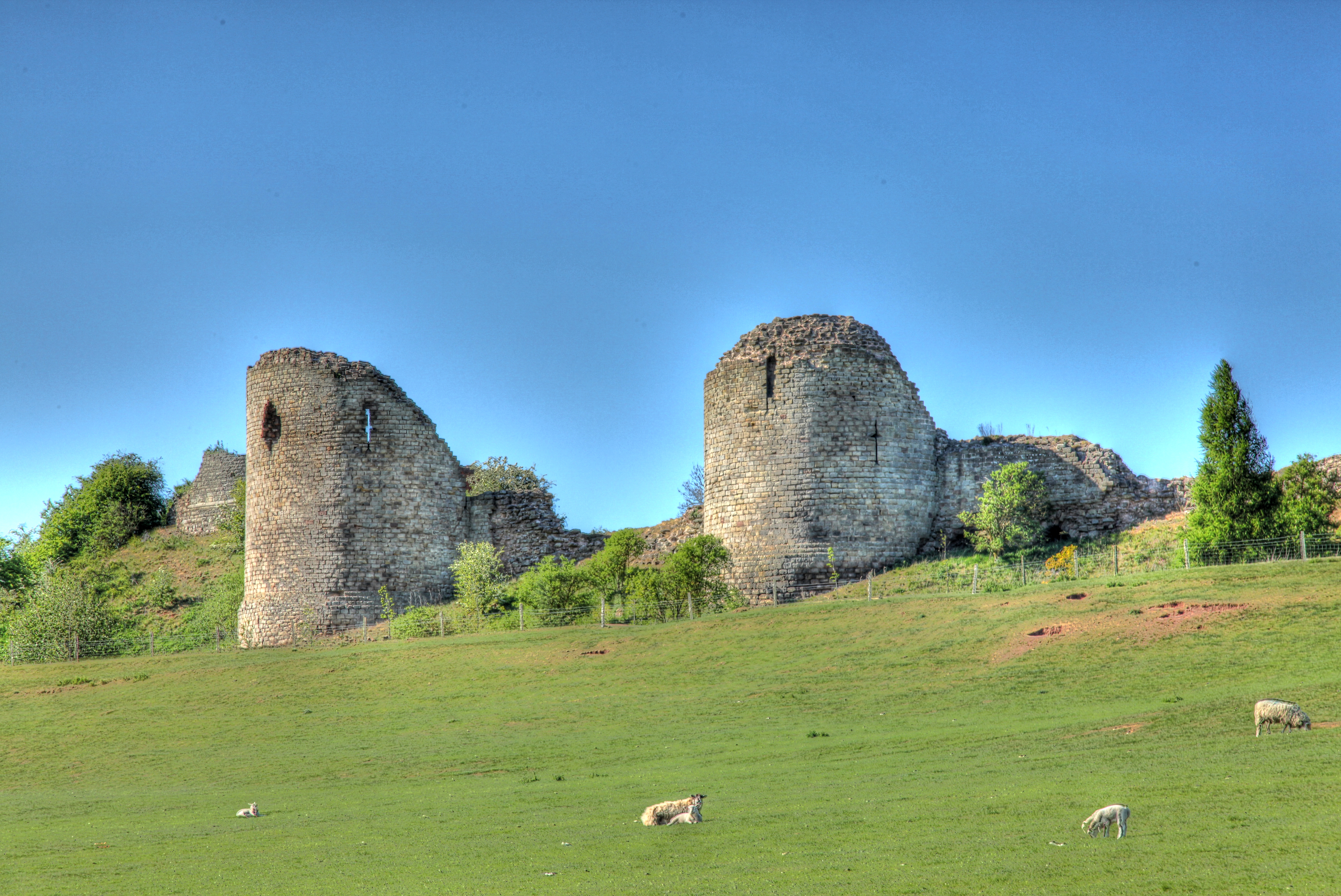
Mary, her doctor, and Bastian were arrested while out hunting near Chartley Castle on 11 August 1586

A letter of the conspirator Charles Paget, who was part of the Babington Plot to free (or incriminate) Mary, gives an insight to Bastian's status, showing he was an intimate of the Queen, but not an essential member of her secretariat. Paget wrote to Mary on 4 January 1586 that he would try to introduce a Catholic priest into the house under the name of Master Alisson. Alisson's innocent letter of introduction would be brought to Bastian or Christine, because if there was a problem the secretaries would not be compromised. Paget's letter was intercepted, deciphered, copied, and signed on the back by Burghley, Hundsdon, Cobham, Shrewsbury and Walsingham.

When the English authorities decided to act on the plot on 11 August 1586, Mary was out riding with Bastian, her doctor Dominique Bourgoing and others, and they were surprised by armed soldiers who took them to nearby Tixall. When Mary was returned to Chartley two weeks later, Bastian was offered the keys to Mary's room, but the Queen told him not to accept and had an English officer open her things. She found her papers had been taken away whereupon she said two things could not be taken from her, her English blood and her Catholic religion. Paulet drew up a new list of her servants, and wrote;

If Bastian's wyfe be discharged yt is like that Bastian will desire to go with his wyfe, wherein there were no greate losse because he is cunning in hys kynde, and full of sleightes to corrupt yonge men.

=== Fotheringhay and France ===
The Queen was moved to Fotheringay Castle, Bastian's daughter, Mary Pagez appears in the list of Mary's servants at Fotheringhay after the Queen's execution in 1587, her parents having been left behind. Paulet thought the dismissed servants left at Chartley were "silly and simple souls" with the exception of Bastian. In a list made of the Queen's possessions and bequests in the keeping of her servants, Mary Pagez's father has in money 300 French crowns, and a "suit of savage attire", which seems to relate to his masque productions or the "ilande wede" Drury saw him wearing at Berwick. Mary Pagez had a jewel with a sapphire from the Queen for her father and another with a green enamelled bird, Christine was given a pair of bracelets and a ring.

After the funeral of Mary, Queen of Scots, at Peterborough Cathedral, the re-united Pagez family were given passports to travel to France. In her will of 7 February 1587, Queen Mary recommended that Mary Pagez should become a servant of the Duchess of Guise.

In 1601, an inventory of the contents of Hardwick Hall included, in the wardrobe, "a picture of Bastean", which may have been a portrait of Bastian Pagez.
