= Sheffield Manor Lodge =

Lodge in Sheffield, South Yorkshire, England

Coordinates: 53.374031°N 1.436656°W

Sheffield Manor Lodge, also known as Sheffield Manor or locally as Manor Castle, is a lodge built about 1516 in what then was a large deer park southeast of Sheffield, South Yorkshire, England, to provide a country retreat and further accommodate George Talbot, the 4th Earl of Shrewsbury, and his large family. The remnant of this estate is now known as Norfolk Park. The housing estate of Manor is named after Sheffield Manor Lodge.

== Description ==
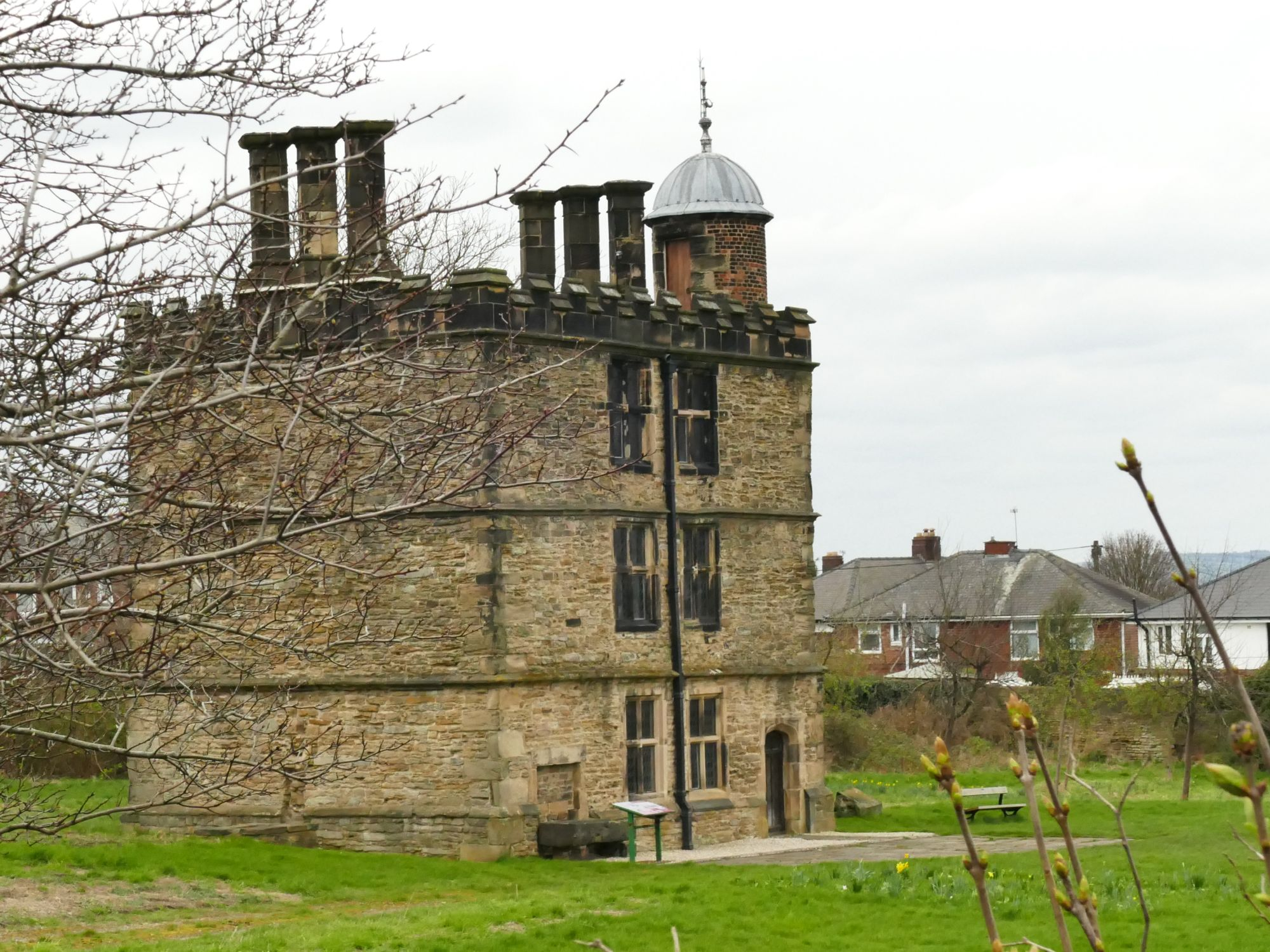
The Turret House

The remains of Sheffield Manor Lodge include parts of the kitchens, long gallery, and the Grade II* listed Turret House (also called "Queen Mary's Tower"), which contains fine sixteenth-century ceilings. Writing in the 17th century, William Dugdale noted that the heraldic decoration in the long gallery dating from around 1525 included the arms of Henry VIII and Catherine of Aragon, and of George Talbot, 4th Earl of Shrewsbury's second wife Elizabeth Walden.

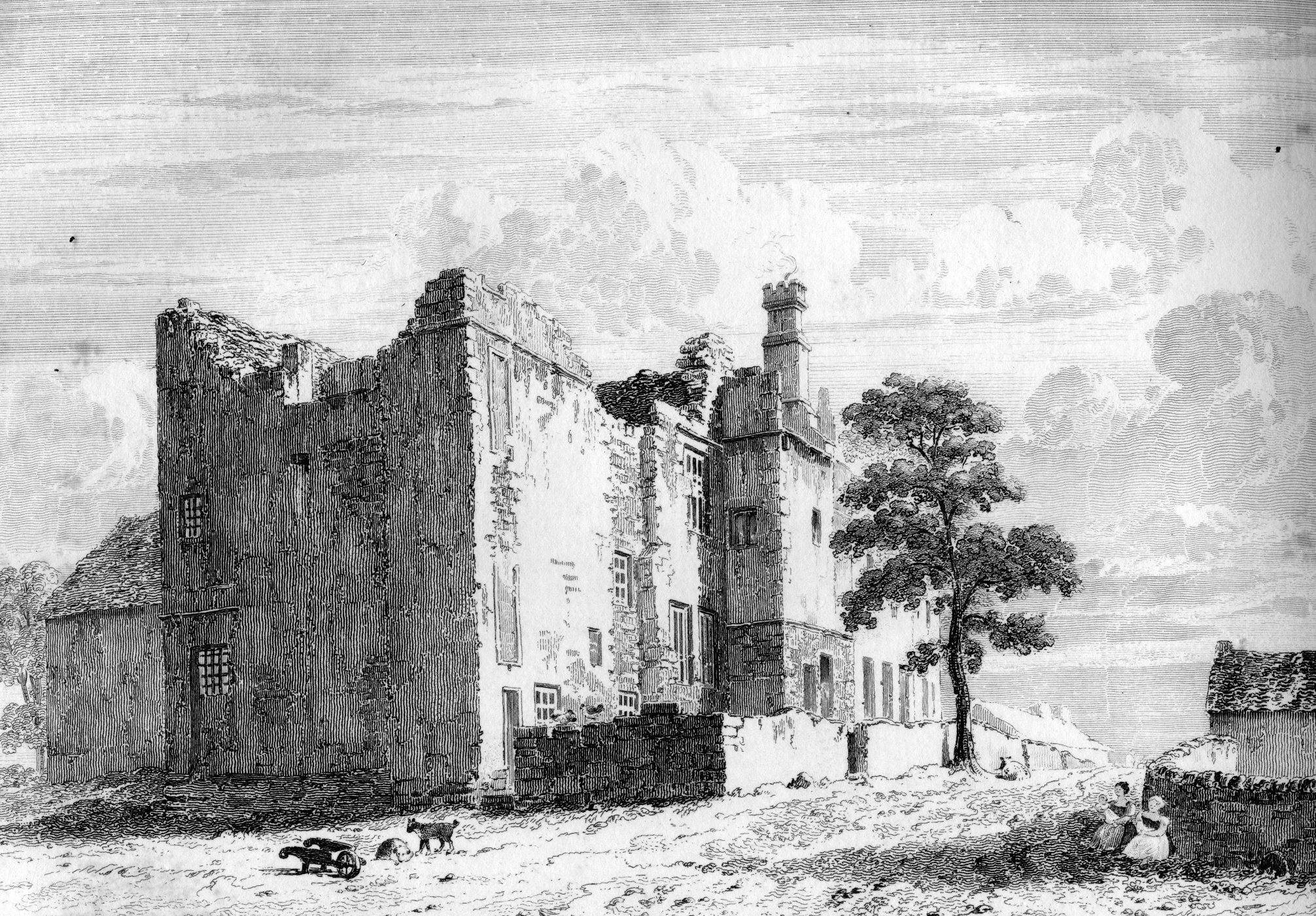
The ruins of Sheffield Manor as they appeared in 1819.

Some evidence points to the Turret House being built by 1574, when George Talbot, 6th Earl of Shrewsbury's accounts record payments for masonry work on the "Tyrret" at Sheffield Manor. It has three storeys of two rooms. The stair at one corner rises above the building onto the roof. This seems to have been designed as a viewing platform and is comparable with the "Hunting Tower" at Chatsworth House.

On 5 August 1577, the Earl of Shrewsbury wrote to William Cecil, who was at Buxton for his health. In a postscript he mentioned that he was sending him a "platt" (plan) of the front or facade of a lodge that he was building. This may have been a drawing for the lodge at Sheffield, or a similar building.

== History ==
=== Mary, Queen of Scots ===
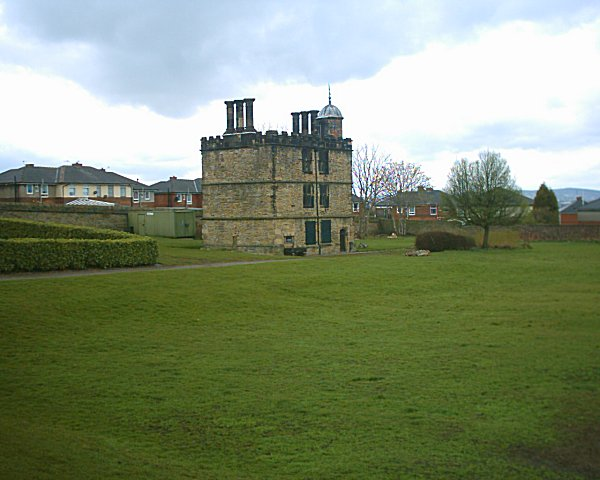
The Turret House at Sheffield Manor Lodge

Mary, Queen of Scots, was held prisoner by the 6th Earl of Shrewsbury at both Sheffield Manor Lodge and Sheffield Castle (her ghost is said by some to haunt the Turret House building). Wolsey's Tower was built to accommodate Cardinal Wolsey, who then died after travelling on to Leicester.

Mary came to England in 1568 after her defeat at the Battle of Langside seeking the support of the Catholic nobility. Mary's freedom was restricted after her cousin Elizabeth was advised of the threat that Mary posed to her own crown.

She was handed over to the custody of George Talbot, 6th Earl of Shrewsbury on 4 February 1569. Talbot had armed guards watching her constantly, however she was still able, with the help of the Duke of Norfolk and others of the Catholic nobility, to plot against Elizabeth. Several times Mary had to be moved to places of greater safety and stricter control.

On 28 November 1570 she was taken to the Earl of Shrewsbury's castle at Tutbury, where, apart from a few breaks at Chatsworth and in Buxton, and more regular visits to Sheffield and the Manor House, she remained for 14 years.

An escape plan made for Mary in February 1571 fell through when she was moved from the Manor to the Castle. She would have escaped from a window and joined riders in the Park led by George Douglas of Helenhill and Henry Percy, who would take her to Scotland.

Despite Mary's actions, Elizabeth still seemed to support her cousin's claim to the Scottish throne, and Mary wrote regularly to her supporters in Scotland asking them to be faithful and to await the help she believed Elizabeth would provide. Two of Mary's letters are preserved in the Sheffield Archives.

The Duke of Norfolk, not long released from the Tower of London, was caught in collusion with the papal agent Roberto di Ridolfi plotting to bring about a Catholic uprising in England. Parliament demanded the execution of both Mary Stuart and Norfolk. At this stage no action was taken against Mary, but the Duke of Norfolk was beheaded in 1572.

==== Material culture of a queen and her household in captivity ====
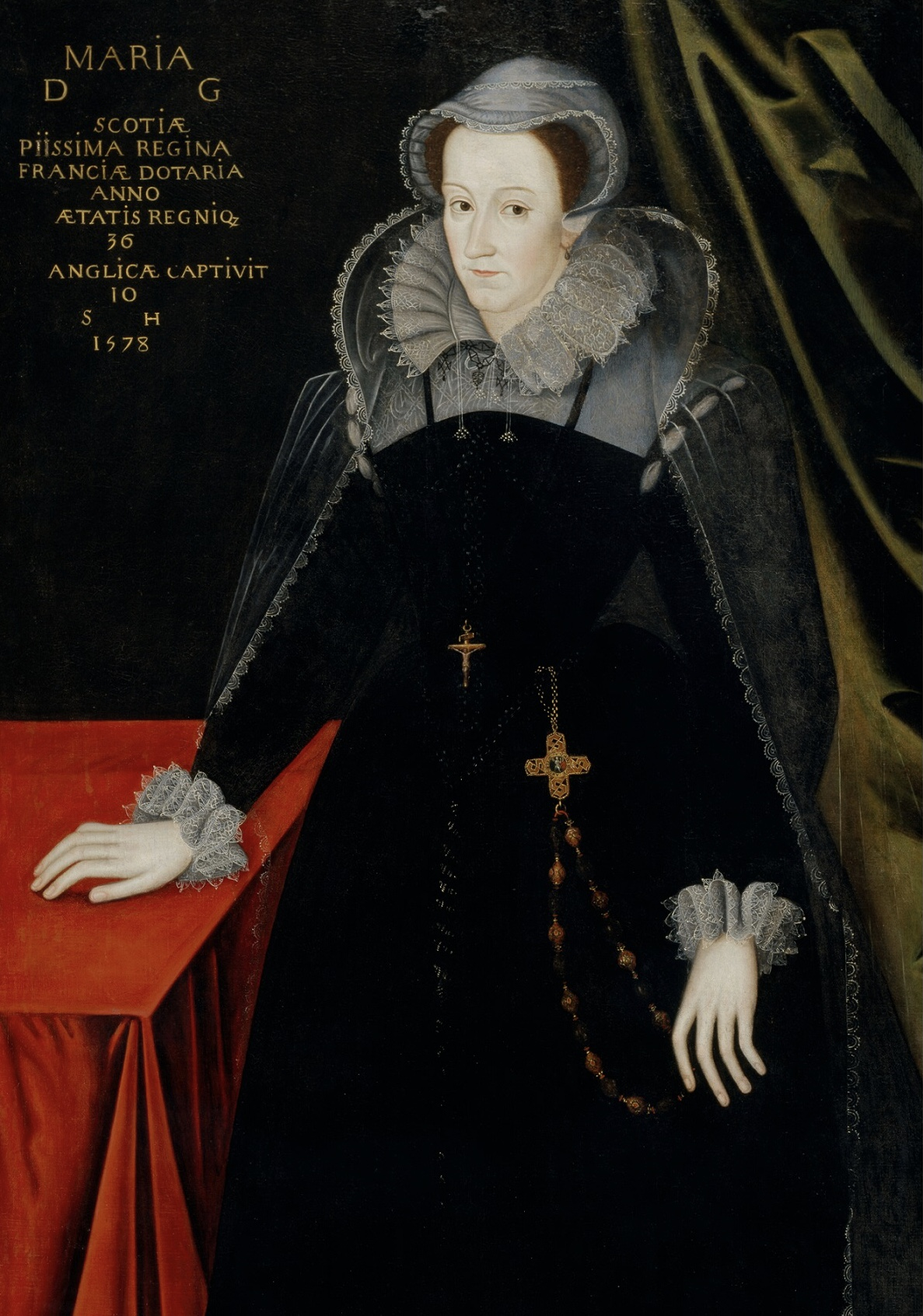
"Sheffield Portrait" type of Mary, Queen of Scots

Mary, Queen of Scots, wrote for turtle doves and Barbary doves to keep in a cage as companions in her captivity at Sheffield. A type of portrait showing her standing beside a table became known as the "Sheffield Portrait" because of two references to artists at work at Sheffield. In March 1577, Mary's secretary Claude Nau wrote that a painter was still working and had not yet perfected the Queen's image. Mary sat for a portrait painter at Sheffield in August 1577. She received a portrait of her son James VI at Sheffield in October 1582, sent by the French ambassador Michel de Castelnau. Later collectors and historians thought Mary's embroiderer Pierre Oudry was a painter, and his name "P. Oudry Pinxit" was added Mary's portrait at Hardwick Hall.

In 1582, while Mary was still being held at Sheffield, an inventory of all the household goods and furniture belonging to George, Earl of Shrewsbury was made. The inventory describes the castle and contents and gives an idea of the types of rooms in the castle at this date. These included a chapel, a porch going into the great hall from the great chamber (which was probably the large dining room), a wardrobe, the Lord's chamber and outer chamber, the Lady's chamber, a bakehouse, brewhouse, pantry, washhouse and low washhouse, a round tower, a square tower and a turret, round towers on either side of the gatehouse and walls running along the waterside, a porter's lodge, a dungeon, a square room, little kitchen, old kitchen, a kennel and a range of stables. There was a still and a serpentine for making distilled waters used in contemporary medicine.

A 1582 inventory made by John Dickonson and William Catterall included the "stuff" of the "Queen of Scots and her people". Mary had a large entourage, which varied over time, made up of Scots, French and English friends and servants. The list of rooms for "her people" furnished by the Earl of Shrewsbury includes those of the Master of the queen's "howsholde"; her secretary Claude Nau; Mademoiselle Rallay; Mary Seton; Mr Burgoing her doctor; Gilbert Curle; Mr Jarvys her "surgion"; Bastian Pagez; the embroiderer Pierre Oudry (his name written as "Pyrawdrawe"); Dedier the pantryman; Hannibal; and Scottish servant Will Black. The 1582 survey also lists the furnishings "in the hawle at the Poandes", now known as the Old Queen's Head, which included painted canvas hangings.

There was a slight earthquake on 16 February 1584. Mary wrote that her ladies were sitting on boxes and chairs working (on sewing and embroidery) on the Saturday evening when the tremor occurred.

==== Letters and the Throckmorton Plot ====
Mary kept up a secret correspondence with her allies. The letters, some encoded in cipher, were carried by her supporters, including George More, a local man whose uncle had a house near Sheffield Manor. In 1583, Francis Walsingham investigated her letters and revealed the Throckmorton Plot.

==== Mary leaves Sheffield ====
In August 1584 Queen Elizabeth finally agreed to Earl George's petition releasing him from his duty of Mary's care. The task had broken his marriage, his health and his chances of further political advancement. After leaving Sheffield, Mary was taken to Wingfield Manor in Derbyshire by her new gaolers, Sir Ralph Sadler and John Somers, and then to Tutbury. From there she went to Chartley Manor in Staffordshire, where she became involved in the Babington Plot.

=== Earl of Shrewsbury ===
Gilbert Talbot, 7th Earl of Shrewsbury and his wife Mary Talbot, Countess of Shrewsbury stayed at Sheffield Lodge. He wrote in December 1604 that they had, "no other music this Christmas than the waits of the next town, besides a taber and a whistle". The Earl had gout and wrote in September 1607 that he was laid up on a couch at Sheffield Lodge, "neither fit for football nor tennis".

=== Duke of Norfolk ===
After Sheffield Manor fell into the hands of the Duke of Norfolk, it was neglected, sold to tenant farmers, and largely dismantled in 1706. Some remaining walls and a window were removed to the grounds of Queen's Tower in Norfolk Park by Robert Marnock in 1839. In 1953 the Duke of Norfolk Estate leased the site to Sheffield City Council for 999 years.

== "Restoration" plan ==
In 2004, the building featured on the BBC TV programme Restoration and was the subject of a National Lottery funding bid to convert it to a heritage centre and traditional farm. Green Estate, which was established by the Manor and Castle Development Trust and Sheffield Wildlife Trust, received £1.25 million from the Heritage Lottery Fund to restore the Turret House and develop the site as a visitor attraction.

== Visitor attraction ==
The Sheffield Manor Lodge visitor attraction includes the Turret house, Tudor grounds, Discovery Centre, and Rhubarb Shed Cafe. The Turret House is open to the public every Sunday between May and September, in Sheffield school holidays, and on special event days.
