= Holbeck Woodhouse =

Coordinates: 53.25°N 1.18°W

- Location within Nottinghamshire
- OS grid reference: SK548730
- Civil parish: Holbeck
- District: Bassetlaw
- Shire county: Nottinghamshire
- Region: East Midlands
- Country: England
- Sovereign state: United Kingdom
- Post town: WORKSOP
- Postcode district: S80
- Dialling code: 01909
- Police: Nottinghamshire
- Fire: Nottinghamshire
- Ambulance: East Midlands
- UK Parliament: Bassetlaw

Holbeck Woodhouse is a hamlet in the civil parish of Holbeck, in the Bassetlaw district, in the county of Nottinghamshire, England. It is located 6 miles south of Worksop and is about ½ mile south of the village of Holbeck. The hamlet is part of the Welbeck Abbey estate, and was built for the Dukes of Portland. Woodhouse Hall was the residence of Robert, first Earl of Kingston, who died in 1643.
