= Guillaume de l'Aubespine de Châteauneuf =

French diplomat

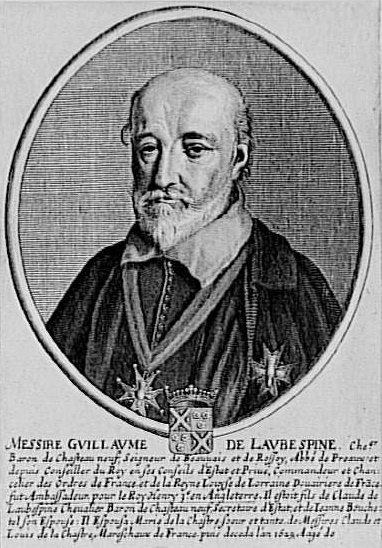
Guillaume de l'Aubespine

Guillaume de l'Aubespine de Châteauneuf (1547–1629) was a French diplomat in London between 1585 and 1589, involved in the affairs of Mary, Queen of Scots. He became the Marquis of Châteauneuf.

== Family background ==
He was a son of Claude de l'Aubespine, baron de Châteauneuf and Jeanne Bochetel, a daughter of the diplomat Guillaume Bochetel. Her brother Jacques Bochetel de la Forest, had been a diplomat in London in the 1560s.

== London and Mary, Queen of Scots ==
Châteauneuf succeeded Michel de Castelnau as ambassador in London in August 1585. He inherited packets of unsent ciphered letters for Mary. In February 1586, Châteauneuf complained to Francis Walsingham that his lodgings were small and had a bad smell, and made his daughter unwell. His wife was pregnant. He hoped that Walsingham would move him to an empty house belonging to Mary Sidney, Countess of Pembroke.

Walsingham had kept spies in Castelnau's household and now determined to intercept Mary's correspondence arriving at the French embassy. Walsingham's agent was the courier Gilbert Gifford. Châteauneuf later described how Gifford would carry secret letters from London to Mary at Chartley Castle. The letters were taken to the nearby houses of Catholic sympathisers, and then hidden in beer barrels for delivery. Her letters to London were delivered by couriers disguised as locksmiths, upholsterers, or other craftsmen.

=== Invisible ink and cipher codes ===
In January 1586, Mary wrote from Chartley to Châteauneuf about maintaining a secret correspondence. Châteauneuf had sent a message or "memorial" to her with John Mowbray of Barnbougle, requesting a new cipher alphabet to encode their letters. The old cipher was no longer to be trusted as so many people knew how to read it.

Mary suggested writing sometimes on supplies of white taffeta or fine linen using invisible ink made with alum. He also could write between the lines on certain pages of new books delivered to her secretary Claude Nau. She thought writing with alum on paper was insecure. Because she often received new slippers, it would be convenient for him to hide secret messages in the cork soles and heels. He should be sure that the slippers with secret letters should be discretely marked on the sole with a fingernail. A cipher alphabet key for their correspondence survives in the National Archives.

=== Babington Plot ===
Anthony Babington was captured in London and the event became a celebration with bonfires and the ringing of church bells. Some of Châteauneuf's servants were arrested during the search for Babington. It was said that the plan was to have Elizabeth shot on 15 August. Châteauneuf and another diplomat, Charles de Prunelé, Baron d'Esneval, who had recently returned from Scotland, had an audience with Elizabeth I at Windsor Castle, and Elizabeth declared that Mary, Queen of Scots, was behind the plot. In September 1586, Châteauneuf wrote to Courcelles, a French diplomat in Scotland, describing the arrest of Mary's secretaries Claude Nau and Gilbert Curle. Papers were seized which were used to implicate Mary in the Babington Plot.

Châteauneuf and his secretary Destrappes were thought be personally involved in the Babington Plot, or another plan to poison Elizabeth I, and he was questioned by William Cecil with the informer William Stafford, a brother of the ambassador in Paris, Edward Stafford. His answers were doubtful, and although it was thought Elizabeth requested his removal he remained in post. Châteauneuf discussed the release of Destrappes with Elizabeth at Croydon Palace in May.

Châteauneuf wrote a description of the discovery of the Babington Plot for Henry III of France. He mentions that Mary was unable to maintain her secret correspondence when Ralph Sadler and Amias Paulet became her custodians. Castelnau had been unable to send letters to her. He describes the role of Gilbert Gifford at length, who brought him a new cipher from Mary and devised a method of delivering letters at Chartley in beer barrels. He described Anthony Babington as young Catholic gentleman who had been a page in the Earl of Shrewbury's household, where he met Mary.

He worked in vain with a special envoy Pomponne de Bellièvre to argue against Mary's execution. An eight-page extract from Châteauneuf's report of the execution was published as Le discours de la mort de trés-haute et treés-illustre Princesse Madame Marie Stouard, Reyne d'Ecosse (Paris, 1587). After Mary's funeral at Peterborough Cathedral, her doctor, Dominique Bourgoing, came to see Châteauneuf, who sent him to Henry III.

In January 1598, a French diplomat in London, Huraut de Maisse, laid the blame for the discovery of the plot and Mary's execution on the ambassador and his secretary Jean Arnault de Cherelles as they were held responsible for Elizabeth's agents obtaining Mary's ciphers.

== Marriage and children ==
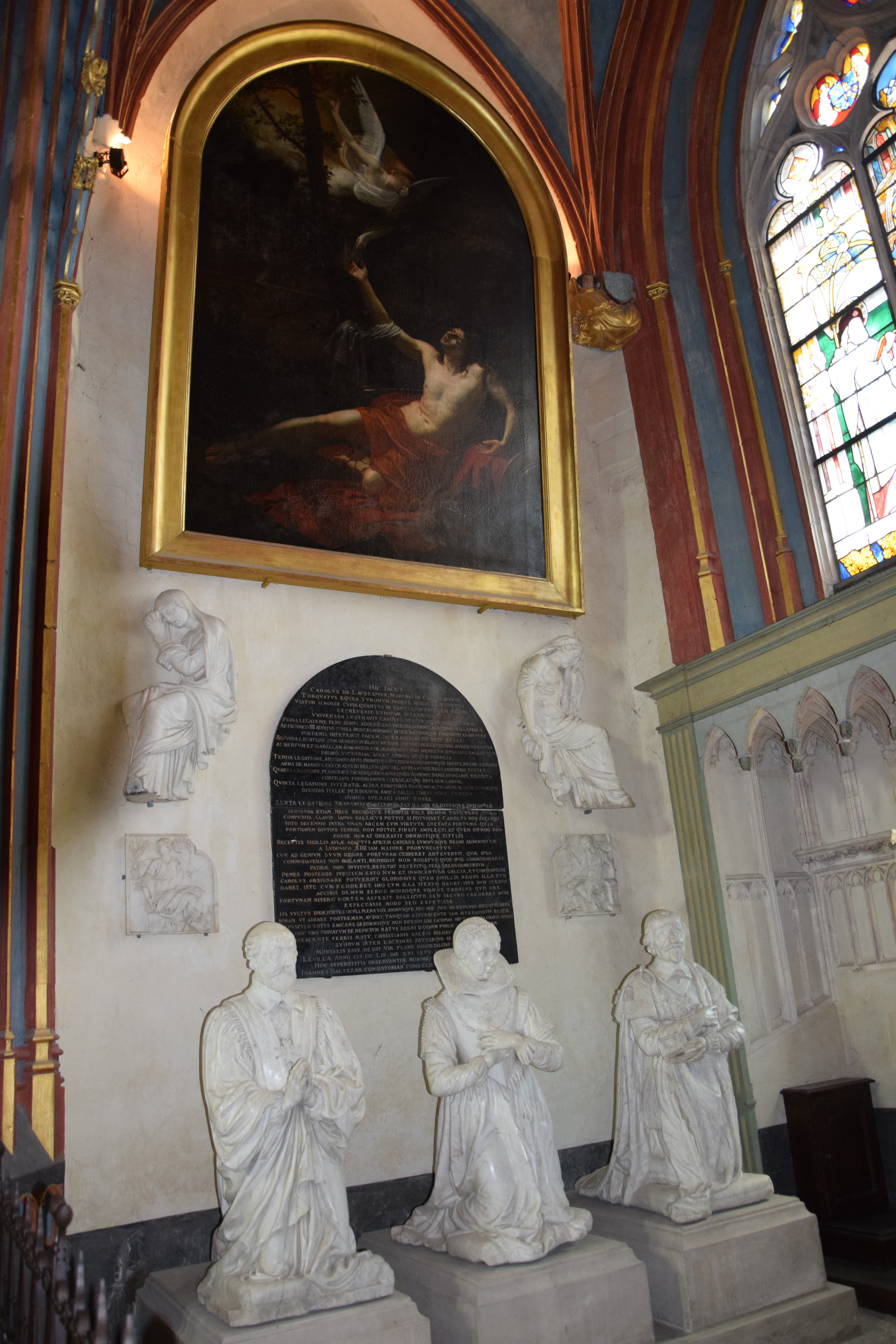
Effigies of the l'Aubespine family by Philippe de Buyster at Bourges Cathedral

In 1573, Guillaume de L'Aubespine married Marie de La Châtre (died 1626), a maid of honour in the household of Catherine de' Medici. She was a daughter of Claude de La Châtre de Maisonfort and Anne Robertet. Daniel Dumonstier made a drawing of Marie de La Châtre, and at least two other portraits survive. In London, she spoke with Elizabeth I and discussed Arbella Stuart.

Their children included:

- Charles de L'Aubespine, Marquis de Châteauneuf (1580–1653), who was ambassador in London in 1629.
- Gabriel de L'Aubespine, Bishop of Orleans (1579–1630)

Charles de L'Aubespine and his parents were commemorated by a marble monument at Bourges Cathedral sculpted by Philippe de Buyster.
