= Claude Nau =

French secretary to Mary, Queen of Scots

Claude Nau or Claude Nau de la Boisseliere (d. 1605) was a confidential secretary of Mary, Queen of Scots, in England from 1575 to 1586. He was involved in coding Mary's letters with cipher keys.

== Career ==
Nau was a successful lawyer practising in Paris. He was recruited by the Guise family in 1574 to be Mary's secretary. Jean Champhuon, sieur du Ruisseau, an advocate who married Nau's sister Claire in 1563, also joined Mary's service. An account of the death of Mary, Queen of Scots, mentions that Ruisseau was Claude Nau's brother-in-law, a beau frere, and Albert Fontenay was Claude Nau's brother or half brother.

Nau was presented by the Duke of Guise, Mary's nephew, to Henry III of France. The King gave him diplomatic accreditation and sent him to Elizabeth I of England. On 29 March 1575, Elizabeth gave him a letter of introduction to the Earl of Shrewsbury the Scottish Queen's keeper at Sheffield Castle. Nau was a replacement for the secretary Augustine Raullet. He was known to Mary's ally in France, James Beaton, Archbishop of Glasgow. Nau was frequently mentioned in Mary's correspondence, and many of his own letters survive. In January 1577, Nau sent cipher code keys to his brother-in-law the treasurer Jean de Champhuon, sieur du Ruisseau, to Mr Douglas, to John Lesley, Bishop of Ross, and to Ralph Lygon, for use in their correspondence with Mary.

=== Sheffield portrait ===
In August 1577 Nau added a postscript to one of Mary's letters to her ally in France, James Beaton, Archbishop of Glasgow, that he intended to send him the queen's portrait, but the painter working at Sheffield Castle had not completed the work to perfection. At this time, Mary was contemplating marriage with John of Austria, a brother of Philip II of Spain, and the Archbishop was her negotiator. Although the artist Nicholas Hilliard had painted Mary's portrait, at this time he was in France. A surviving miniature portrait of Mary, in a later setting, the Blairs jewel, may date from this period and is associated with Elizabeth Curle, the sister of Mary's Scottish secretary Gilbert Curle.

In the same month, Claude Nau wrote twice to his brother, du Ruisseau, using cipher codes. He hoped that du Ruisseau could be promoted to be treasurer of Mary's French dowry in place of René Dolu, and that du Ruisseau would speak to his own advantage at the French court. Nau also asked him to buy some jewellery: a locket with a catch or a sealed box (une petite boite fermee et cachetee), a pair of bracelets made in the latest fashion, and a diamond or emerald shaped like a heart or triangle. A case for a miniature portrait was sometimes known as a "picture box" in English, as une boîte à portrait in French, and in Spanish, a caxa or caxilla, although Nau was probably referring to the packaging of the bracelets and stone "closed-up in a small box under seal". Nau advised that the precious stone would cost less from a specialist lapidary than from a goldsmith, and prices were cheaper because of the wars in France. Mary considered other candidates to replace Dolu in October 1579, including the father-in-law of the writer Adam Blackwood.

=== Negotiations in Scotland and London ===
In June 1579, Mary sent Nau as her ambassador to her son, James VI of Scotland, instead of John Lesley, Bishop of Ross. She wrote to George Bowes at Berwick-upon-Tweed at the border asking him to assist Nau's journey. However, the Scottish court at Stirling Castle would not allow him an audience, apparently because Mary's letter was addressed to her son, not the King. Although Francis Walsingham had directed Nicolas Errington, Provost Marshal of Berwick, to accompany Nau to the Scottish court, he had no papers from Elizabeth. The Privy Council of Scotland issued a proclamation that he deserved punishment and should be commanded to depart. Errington reported that few spoke to Nau except old servants requesting payment.

Mary mentioned in a letter to the Countess of Atholl that Nau had brought "tokens", gifts for her supporters, and a picture and a book for James. Some accounts say that Nau tried to deliver a gift of valuable jewels and a vest that she had embroidered for James. The chronicle known as The Historie of James the Sext describes the gift as "certain jewels and ornaments to his body". Errington wrote to Francis Walsingham that Nau had been unable to deliver Mary's tokens. Nau wrote that he had not been allowed to see James VI in a postscript to Mary's letter of 4 July 1579 to the Archbishop of Glasgow. James eventually wrote an apology to Mary for Nau's frosty reception.

Mary wanted Nau to go to Scotland again in 1582, and asked the ambassador Michel de Castelnau to get permissions. Claude's brother-in-law, the Sieur de Fontenay, sent from France, had more success. Fontenay was able to meet James VI in August 1584. Fontenay wrote to Claude Nau about his good reception, James had met him in his cabinet at Holyroodhouse, and lent him a horse to join the hunting at Falkland Palace. On 15 November 1584, Nau came to London as Mary's ambassador and was lodged in a house belonging to Ralph Sadler. He spoke with Elizabeth, on the subject of Mary's allegations against Bess of Hardwick. Mary wanted Bess of Hardwick and her sons to acknowledge before the French ambassador that rumours about her were untrue. Nau also hoped to put forward the idea of the "association", a scheme to return Mary to Scotland as joint ruler with her son. However, James VI and another Scottish diplomat, the Master of Gray, made it known that James was not about to accept joint rule. Nau was informed of plans to move Mary to another lodging, at Tutbury Castle.

While Fontenay was still in Edinburgh, in March 1585, he warned Nau that a rumour was circulating at the Scottish court that Mary made him sleep with her (que sa majeste vous faisoit coucher avec elle), and so they should modify their familiar behaviour when the Master of Gray visited.

=== Windows at Buxton ===
Nau sometimes used the name "Jacques". When Mary went to Buxton, Latin verses were inscribed on the windows of her lodging, now the Old Hall Hotel. Two verses, engraved in praise of Mary and Buxton's well, which no longer survive but were copied down, were signed "Jac: Nau facieb."

=== Pierrepont ===
Nau had a relationship with a young woman in Mary's household, Bess or Elizabeth Pierrepont. In April 1586 he sent a friend to discuss marriage with her father Henry Pierrepont. According to the French ambassador in London, Guillaume de l'Aubespine de Châteauneuf, Gilbert Gifford was involved in the discussions and Mary did not approve.

Mary became to approve of Nau's marriage, but it seems her father had other ideas and removed her from the household.

The journal of the last days of Mary's household written by the physician Dominique Bourgoing suggests she remained with Mary, and mentions the discovery of a promise or contract of marriage discovered after Nau's papers were searched.

=== Cipher codes and the Babington Plot ===
Nau and another secretary Gilbert Curle were arrested at Chartley in 1586. They were escorted to London by Thomas Gorges. He seems to have lived comfortably with the family of Francis Walsingham in London. Nau was watched or supervised by a man called Anthony Hall, a Mr Mills, and John Allen. Allen was later accused of allowing Nau to correspond with Bess Pierrepont. Elizabeth I considered that neither Nau or Curle were so desperate that they might kill themselves.

Jérôme Pasquier, a servant who coded Mary's letters, was also arrested. Pasquier was questioned in the Tower of London about the Babington Plot and the writing of cipher codes in Mary's household. He told Thomas Phelippes that Nau kept the alphabets and cipher keys. Pasquier usually did his cipher work in Nau's chamber. Mary kept the letters in cipher herself.

Nau was accused of deciphering a letter from Anthony Babington and composing a reply from Mary (by discussion and dictation) which Gilbert Curle translated into English. Francis Walsingham sent news to the Scottish Court in September 1586 that Mary was to be moved to Fotheringhay, and that "the matters whereof she is guilty are already so plain and manifest (being also confessed by her two secretaries), as it is thought, they shall require no long debating".

During his questioning, Nau said that Mary was averse to plans to invade England and replace Elizabeth, known as the "Enterprise", considering that she might have to renounce her claim to the throne in favour of her son James VI, or that neither she or her son would gain the English throne. Nau claimed Mary only wished to intervene or interfere in Scotland. Nau said he deciphered one or more incoming letters from Babington and had advised Mary not to reply and thus incriminate herself, and then reluctantly made a French draft which Curle translated into English and ciphered.

On 4 September 1586, Walsingham's secretary Francis Curle obtained a statement from Gilbert Curle that Nau was the "principal instrument" in making Mary's replies to Babington's letters. Evidence from the confessions of Nau and Curle was heard by the commission for Mary's trial at Fotheringhay on the afternoon of 14 October 1586. William Cecil said that both secretaries knew of Babington's plotting and had tried to dissuade her from becoming involved with him. Their statements were again reviewed in the Star Chamber on 25 October.

Mary thought that her secretaries, Nau and Curle, and the clerk Pasquier, had betrayed her during their questioning, and she altered her will. After Mary's funeral, Nau returned to France with Pasquier. Nau was exonerated from accusations of treachery to Mary by the King and the Duke of Guise.

James Melville of Halhill, a Scottish courtier, asserted in his Memoirs that Nau had been "easily corrupted to discover all her majesty's intelligences and doings", was richly rewarded by William Cecil, and was not subjected to torture.

Some years later, Anthony Hall wrote a petition to William Cecil, asking for employment for his son as a herald painter. He mentioned that he had been the keeper of "Jacques de Naa, the Scottishe Queenes Secretarie" for six weeks. He had been Nau's companion during his imprisonment and shared his chamber. Hall wrote that the decipherer Thomas Phillipes and Walsingham's secretary Francis Milles would vouch for his service.

In 1605, Nau wrote to James VI and I. He suggested that Mary was not guilty because she had no freedom of action. He said he had tried not to prejudice Mary during his questioning by Cecil and Walsingham. He had not taken any bribes from Elizabeth, and the only gift he had from her was her portrait in miniature or in cameo framed in ebony, which he was given in November 1585. Nau gave this portrait to Mary.

== Works ==
Joseph Stevenson rediscovered Nau's memoirs of Mary and her history and published these works in 1883. Stevenson also attributed a treatise in French on Mary's title to the English throne to Nau.

Nau wrote a history of the years 1542 to 1545 which describes Regent Arran taking power in Scotland, possession of Holyroodhouse and Falkland Palace, and the exchequer. He describes the burning of Edinburgh in May 1544. He tells a story, also found in John Lesley's History of Scotland, of the banquet for the Patriarch of Venice, where a buffet laden with Venetian glass was deliberately tipped over to impress the envoy with an idea of Scotland's material wealth. The manuscript was found among Nau's papers at Chartley and Thomas Phelippes added a title "Storye of Scotland by Nau".

Nau started translating John Lesley's Latin history of Scotland, the De Origine, into French. He did not complete this historical work.
