= Dominique Bourgoing =

French physician

Dominique Bourgoing (died 1589) was a French physician in the household of Mary, Queen of Scots. He is notable as the author of an influential account of Mary's captivity and execution.

== Doctor in the household ==
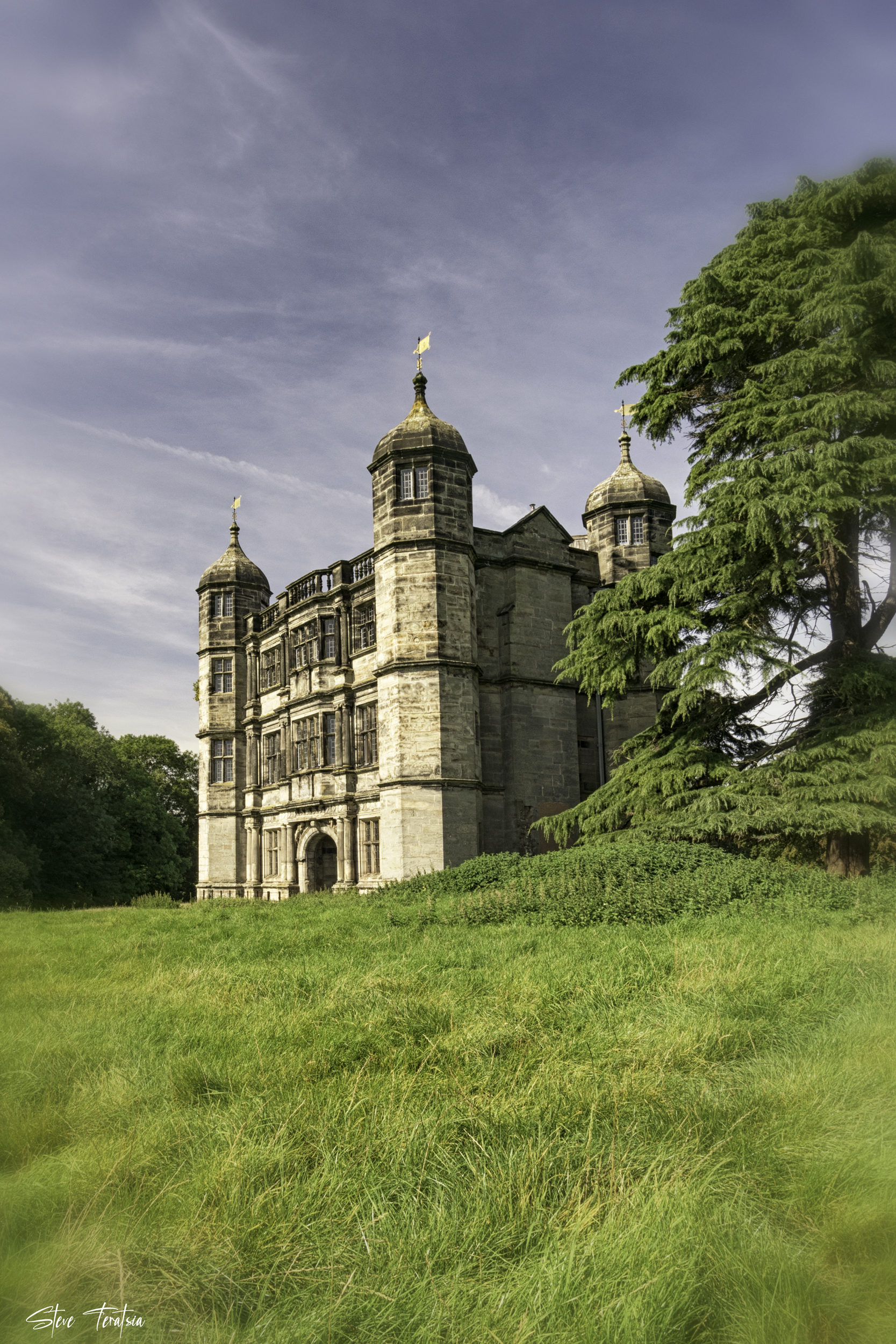
Bourgoing was taken with Mary, Queen of Scots, to Tixall

Bourgoing trained in Paris. He defended theses on subjects including pulmonary health and poisoning. He qualified in 1577 and was listed as a physician member of the royal household of Henry III of France in 1580.

Mary wanted a new physician in her household in September 1578, as the post was held by an old man, Marguerin, known as the Sieur du Castil. The French diplomat Nicolas d'Angennes, sieur de Rambouillet, in London to discuss the Anjou Courtship, passed her request to Queen Elizabeth. Mary asked the resident French ambassador Michel de Castelnau (Mauvissière) to obtain a passport for the doctor's nephew to come to Sheffield and escort the veteran home. She was still looking for another physician in June 1579. Castelnau obtained a passport from Elizabeth I for the new physician in February 1580. However, Mary was not allowed to have her choice of physician for several months, as Elizabeth and her ministers were suspicious of her servants as potential message carriers.

Mary found two English doctors sent to her in May 1582 to be unsuitable, and criticised Dr Smythe as a follower of Paracelsus. Bourgoing was recorded in several letters and administrative documents as a member of Mary's household in England from 1582, as a replacement for Jacques de Lugerie or Luserie, who was also a member of the French royal household, and for Marquerin du Castel, a physician serving in Mary's household in 1571 and 1573, and was at Sheffield in 1574.

Once in post, Bourgoing sent updates on Mary's health to Michel de Castelnau, the French ambassador in London. Mary also had surgeons and apothecaries including Arnauld Colommiers, Jacques Gervais and Pierre Gorion.

Mary could be critical of her medical staff, and complained in January 1580 about an apothecary whose remedies seem to worsen her illnesses. The unfortunate apothecary had been recommended to her by Adam Blackwood.

Bourgoing's bed, and a bed for Gervais the surgeon were mentioned in an inventory of Sheffield Manor Lodge made in 1583. In March 1580, Mary wrote about her son's indigestion, saying she had discussed the illness with Bourgoing, and when she was a child about the same age, Lusgerie had treated her for the same. She advised that James VI eat confected nuts and nutmeg, and ivory worn on the stomach. Bourgoing noted that Suzanne Kirkcaldy (a daughter of William Kirkcaldy of Grange) acted as his servant or chamberer. Bourgoing also had an English servant named Ralph.

Mary was arrested on 11 August 1586 while out riding and hunting with a crossbow near Chartley Castle with her secretaries Gilbert Curle and Claude Nau, Bastian Pagez, Bourgoing and others. They were surprised by armed soldiers who took them to Tixall. Bourgoing's Journal describes subsequent events.

According to some accounts of Mary's death, Bourgoing persuaded Mary to drink some wine and eat a bit of bread before her execution. Mary wrote her last letter to Henry III of France on 8 February 1587 before her execution. She hoped Bourgoing would be able to tell her story. She asked Henry III to pay her servants and she sent him two precious stones that served as talismans against illness.

In March 1587, Bourgoing and Andrew Melville wrote to Amias Paulet the keeper of the late queen's household at Fotheringhay about the return of money and conditions offered for their return to France.

=== Medical materials ===
After Mary's execution, an inventory was made of her possessions. Bourgoing had several medical items in his keeping, including a little gold bottle containing a stone (a bezoar stone) used as a medicine for colic, and a silver bottle with a stone used a remedy for poison. A ring with a sapphire and an enamel ring were also counted as jewels of Mary, Queen of Scots. Precious objects for medicinal purposes were usually kept in Mary's cabinet room, including the bezoar stone, an oval charm against melancholy, and sachets or boxes of powdered coral, pearl, mummia, and terre sigillée (a medicinal clay used as an antidote to poison). The clay and a piece of supposed unicorn horn, an antidote against poison, were sent from France by Mary's ally, the Archbishop of Glasgow.

Mary had a recurring rheumatic pain in her right side and arm, which sometimes left her unable to write. John Lesley, Bishop of Ross, sent cinnamon water, and the French diplomat Bertrand de Salignac de la Mothe-Fénelon sent confected nutmegs, mithridate, and an ointment which the queen used on her side. In November 1574, James Good, a physician in London, had sent Mary cinnamon water and "aqua mattioli" (an alcoholic preparation named after the contemporary Italian herbalist Pietro Andrea Mattioli), with an ointment for her spleen and another for her stomach, with a tin of mithradate. Good wrote to Mary that Lady Cobham was sending mithradate to her. He was subsequently questioned about his involvement with conspirators including Thomas Morgan.

== Writing about Mary ==
Bourgoing's journal of Mary's last days commences on 11 August 1586. A manuscript was published by Régis Chantelauze (1821-1888) in 1876.

- Regis Chantelauze, Marie Stuart : son proces et son execution, d'apres le journal inedit de Bourgoing son medecin (Paris, 1876), pp. 466-578

The manuscript includes copies of two letters written by Mary, her well-known "last letter" to Henri II, and a letter to Elizabeth written at Fotheringhay in January 1587.

English versions of the journal were published by Mary Monica Maxwell-Scott and Samuel Cowan.

Mary was taken from Chartley to Fotheringhay. According to an inscription formerly on a window at Hill Hall in Abbots Bromley, she rested there on 21 September 1586. Bourgoing's journal includes some names and placenames in connection with Mary's itinerary not recorded elsewhere. It reveals that she stayed at an inn in Leicester called the Angel, and at Roger Smith's house at Withcote, and passed by Collyweston Palace.

Bourgoing supplies Mary's words and speeches at her trial and before her execution. Bourgoing's account of the death of Mary was used by the contemporary author Adam Blackwood in La mort de la royne d'Escosse, douairiere de France (1588) and other works. According to Blackwood, Mary asked Bourgoing to take her heart to France.
