= Marie Courcelles =

Scottish court official

Marie Courcelles (fl. 1562 – fl. 1609) was a Scottish court official. She served as a chamberer to Mary, Queen of Scots.

== Life ==
She arrived to Scotland from France in 1562 to join the household of Queen Mary. She was not the only Frenchwoman at court: nine accompanied the queen from France in 1561 under the supervision of her French chamberlain, Servais de Condé: Guyonne de Péguillon; Marie Pyerres (Madame de Briante), Joanne de la Reyneville (Lady Creich), Isabelle Camp (Demoiselle de Cobron) and Suzanne Constant (Demoiselle de Fonterpuys), as well as seven maids-of-honour under a governess, Madamoiselle de la Souche.

In May 1562 the queen bought Courcelles, described as one of her "chamber women", shoes, linen, black taffeta for a skirt, and a farthingale. In January 1563 she was described as a "maiden in the Queen's chamber" and given a black velvet gown with another farthingale. In June 1566 she was "maiden and femme" in the Queen's chamber and was given silk chamlet and velvet for her clothes. When Mary gave linen to her household for Easter in 1567, Courcelle was named in the account among the "femmes de chambre", the chamber women, rather than one of the ladies or maidens. Toussaint Courcelles, a valet in the Queen's chamber, was probably her brother. Claude de Courcelles, a diplomat and secretary of the French ambassador in London Michel de Castelnau, was probably a relation.

When the queen was imprisoned at Lochleven, Marie Courceles accompanied her there with Mary Seton and Jane Kennedy. In the first weeks at Lochleven, it was said that Mary was attended by five or six ladies, four gentlewomen and two chamberers, one French and one Scottish. Courcelles was the French chamberer.

One of Mary's attendants was questioned about a gold jewel or ring sent to Mary at Lochleven Castle, by William Maitland of Lethington and Mary Fleming, and said that Courcelles had described it. The jewel depicted the lion and mouse of Aesop's fable, and was a token alluding to the possibility of escape, and their continuing support for her, the mouse could free the lion by nibbling away the knots of the net.

Marie Courcelles played a role in the queen's escape. She reportedly took part in planning the escape along with George Douglas and Willie Douglas. On Sunday 2 May 1568, it was she who received the keys from Willie Douglas and brought the queen to the postern gate where a boat was waiting for them with an escort. When the queen escaped from Lochleven. Marie Courcelles stayed behind with Mary Seton. An Italian account of the escape says that Mary exchanged her clothes with older of her two maids or chamberers, while the youngest brought her to the gate.

She joined Queen Mary in exile at Sheffield Castle. A list of Queen Mary's household made when she was at Coventry in November 1569 notes that Courcelles and Mary Bruce, a daughter of the Laird of Airth, slept in the queen's bedchamber.

The queen requested that she might retire and return to France in December 1581. She renewed the request in April 1583.

It has been suggested that she accompanied Mary Seton to Reims on her retirement in 1583. She made petition to James VI and I in 1609 for pay as his mother's servant. A grant was awarded to her and to one of her children.

== See also ==
- Mademoiselle Rallay
