= Funeral of Mary, Queen of Scots =

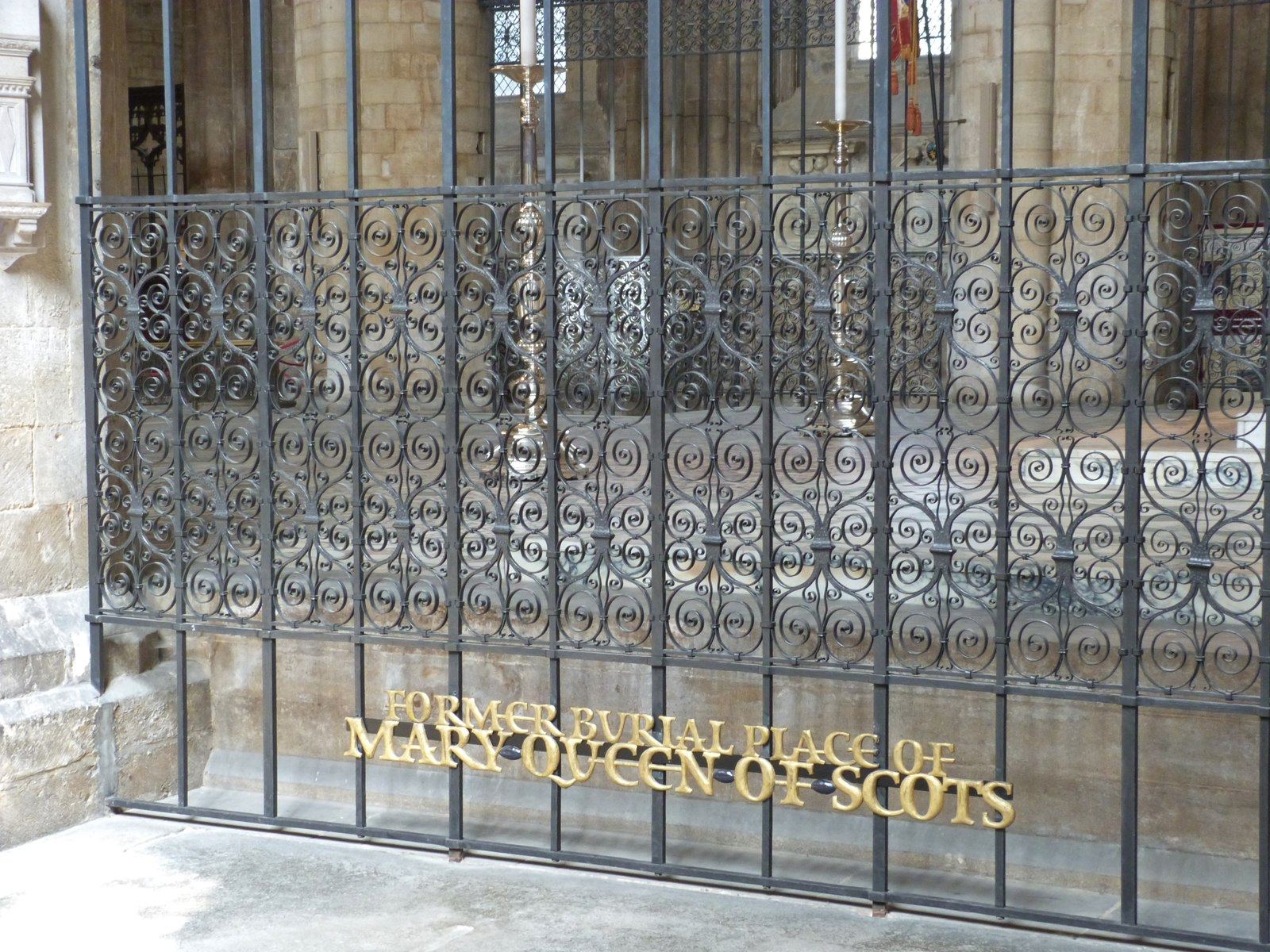
Commemorative railings at Peterborough Cathedral

Mary, Queen of Scots, was buried at Peterborough Cathedral on 1 August 1587 with a heraldic funeral, following her execution at Fotheringhay Castle on 8 February 1587. In 1612, her son James VI and I ordered her reburial at Westminster Abbey.

== At Fotheringhay ==
Mary's servants who were held at Chartley were brought to Fotheringhay in February after the execution. Much of the furnishings and silver plate from Mary's lodging were sent to London. Amias Paulet described this as the "best stuff". Mary had made verbal bequests of many of her jewels and other items to her gentlewomen and male servants. These were retained at Fotheringhay in the custody of Andrew Melville, Dominique Bourgoing, and Jane Kennedy. Paulet sent an inventory of these latter items to Francis Walsingham which survives in The National Archives (TNA).

Adam Blackwood wrote that Mary's body was kept in a chamber near the scene of execution at Fotheringhay, and after a time Mary's body and head were sealed in a lead casket. Some accounts mention that Mary's servants were able to peep through a gap in a partition and saw that the body was covered with a cloth from a billiard table.

Henry III of France organised a funeral or commemorative service at Notre-Dame de Paris in March. In June, the lead coffin at Fotheringhay was found to be ruptured and was mended by a plumber. The remaining servants petitioned for Mary's funeral to be held and their detention ended. John Mowbray of Barnbougle wrote to ask James VI if the body would be taken to Scotland for burial. Robert Melville replied that it was all "too recent" to ask the king. Melville trusted Elizabeth would soon release the servants.

== Preparations ==
John Fortescue, Master of the Wardrobe of Elizabeth I, was sent to organise the funeral at Peterborough. Mourning clothes were to be provided for Mary's household, who had remained at Fotheringhay. At first Mary's servants refused the new garments as they already wore mourning clothes and there was disagreement over the fashion of women's mourning hoods worn either in French or English style. A tirewoman, the wife of Hugh Rogers, was sent from London to make coiffures for the day of the funeral. She may have been the Elizabeth Rogers who made blackwork embroidery for Elizabeth.

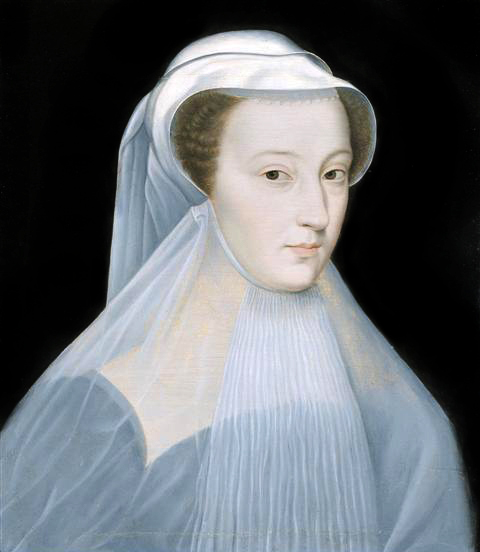
Portrait of Mary, Queen of Scots, wearing a mourning "barbe" veil beneath her chin

Fortescue's account mentions "Paris heads" fashioned for the high-status female mourners, with "barbes and linen", "bongraces" and "kerchers" worn as headdresses and face-coverings. A "Paris head" was a close cap with two lappets hanging at the back, worn in England (but now a name associated with Mary's white mourning cap and veil). Paris heads were worn at the funerals of Elizabeth of York in 1503 and Anne of Cleves in 1556. These garments were worn at other Elizabethan funerals; at the funeral of Katherine, Lady Berkeley at Coventry St Michaels in May 1596, two knight's wives wore similar mourning with "round Parys heads, boungrace, and barbes of fine lawne". A "barbe" was a covering or veil over the mouth and chin, or worn bib-like under the chin. At Peterborough, one Scottish gentlewoman received a "large attire of lawn with a barbe", this was perhaps Barbara Moubray, the wife of Gilbert Curle, whose name is included in the order of procession. Some sketches of the funeral procession are held by the British Library (MS Add. 35324), these show conventional mourning dress.

Fortescue bought 1599 1/2 yards of black cloth in seven different qualities. The herald William Dethick arranged the building of a wooden hearse in Peterborough Cathedral. This hearse was a stationary architectural heraldic display, not a conveyance for the coffin. It was 27 feet high, covered with black velvet set with escutcheons, and decorated with gold fringes. Rooms in the Bishop's Palace and the nave of the cathedral were draped with black cloth and baize. Some of the baize was hired from a merchant, William Albany.

Mary's body was brought from Fotheringhay via Huntingdon to Peterborough on a chariot drawn by four horses at night on 30 July, a distance of 12 miles. William Dethick organised the procession. The coffin was interred near the resting place of Catherine of Aragon, without ceremony. One reason recorded for this was that the hot weather might cause the solder of the lead coffin to fail. The graves of both Queens were dug by Robert Scarlett. The official mourners arrived on 31 July. Bridget Russell, Countess of Bedford was the chief mourner and representative of Elizabeth I. Among the chief mourners was William Cecil's sister Elizabeth Alington, as a substitute for Susan, Lady Cromwell. The names of the mourners and banner holders vary in contemporary lists.

There was a supper in the Great Hall of the Bishop's Palace, where a cloth of estate of purple velvet and a chair was installed, and used by the Countess of Bedford. A large amount of food was bought for this meal, and for a dinner after the funeral on the following day. Richard Cox, clerk to Gregory Lovell, cofferer to Elizabeth's household, accounted for the expenses of the food and the cooks to Bryan Cave and Marmaduke Darrell.

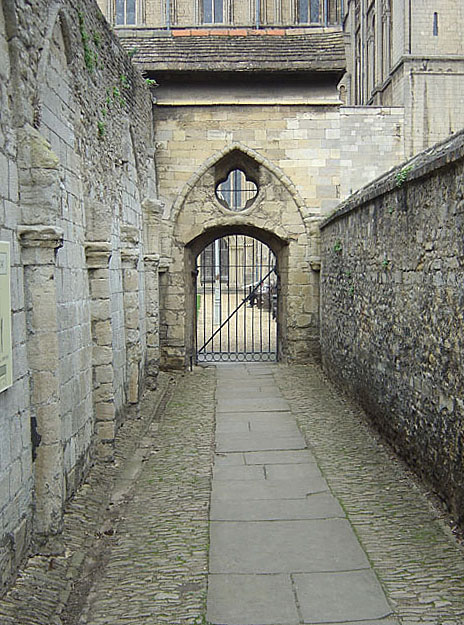
Ruins of the monastic refectory at Peterborough

== Funeral in the cathedral ==
For the funeral on Tuesday 1 August, Lammas Day, a "representation" of Mary, thought to have been an either an effigy or a group of symbolic objects, was carried from the Palace into the cathedral and placed on the hearse. A British Library sketch of the procession depicts an effigy.

The procession from the Palace to the church was led by 100 or 120 poor women in black cloth gowns and white Holland linen head dresses (called "kerchers"), provided by Fortescue. Their appearance was traditional or old-fashioned. Next followed those in mourning cloaks and mourning gowns. Andrew Noel carried the banner of Scotland. Six gentlemen brought in the "representation" under a velvet canopy supported on poles by Thomas Manners, John or George Hastings, James Harington, and Richard Knightley. The train of the Countess of Bedford's gown was carried by Lucy Paulet, Lady St John of Basing or Elizabeth, Lady Mordaunt. Ten or eight women from Mary's household followed, wearing hoods with black taffeta at the front and white veils at the back in the French fashion. Mabel Harington walked with her sister Elizabeth, Lady Montagu.

The description of the funeral in La Mort de la Royne D'Escosse states that Scottish attendants who processed into the cathedral were Barbara Mowbray, Christine Hog (the wife of Bastian Pagez), Gillis Mowbray, Elspeth Curle, Renée de Rallay, Marie Pagez (a daughter of Bastian), Jean Kennedy, and Susanne Kirkcaldy (a daughter of William Kirkcaldy of Grange).

Dominique Bourgoing and most of the Scottish mourners from Mary's household left the cathedral before the service started, not wishing to attend a Protestant service. Andrew Melville of Garvock and Gillis Mowbray remained, some accounts mention Barbara Moubray. William Wickham, Bishop of Lincoln, gave a sermon and a prayer, remarking that he had not met Mary. Banners were placed on the hearse, and symbolic objects including armour, a wooden sword, helmet and crown, were delivered from the hearse to the Bishop. Some of these were displayed in the cathedral until 1643. Richard Fletcher, Dean of Peterborough, read the funeral service where Mary was buried, and then the broken rods of her officers were placed in the grave.

The French ambassador Guillaume de l'Aubespine de Châteauneuf, who did not come to the funeral, described the events at Peterborough, as assez solemnelles, adequately solemn, attended by Mary's servants who were now free to return home. Dominique Bourgoing would kiss the hands of French royal family, and Jérôme Pasquier would bring a mémoire for Henry III.

An account of the funeral was published in 1589 as The Scottish Queen's Burial at Peterborough upon Tuesday being Lammas Day, 1587.

== Scottish and French mourners ==
English officials on the day included Lord St John of Basing as Lord Steward, Lord Dudley as Lord Chamberlain, and Edward Montagu as treasurer. Marmaduke Darrell asked Andrew Melville, Mary's Master of Household, to decide which members of Mary's household should assist at the funeral. Mourners from Mary's household who attended at Peterborough included; Barbara Moubray, Renée de Rallay known as Beauregard, Christian Hog (wife of Bastian Pagez), Mary Pagez, Gillis Mowbray, Jean Kennedy, Elspeth or Elizabeth Curle, and Susanna Kirkcaldy (who acted as Bourgoing's chamberer).

The male servants included Andrew Melville who was given a high-status position at the funeral. The other servants attending were Dominique Bourgoing the physician, Camille du Preau the almoner, Pierre Gorion the apothecary, the surgeon Jacques Gervais, Balthazar Hully of the wardrobe, Bastian Pagez, Hannibal Stewart, Didier Siflard the sommelier, Jean Lauder of the pantry, Martin Huet the cook, Nicolas de la Mere the pastry chef, Robin Hamilton assistant cook, Laurens de la Chapelle the usher, and Simon Jacqui described as the valet de fourrier and possibly an upholsterer like his predecessor Nicolas Guillebault. After the funeral, some of Mary's servants had to wait in London for a few weeks to obtain passports to travel to France.

Mary had written letters in cipher code about employing or rewarding Susanna Kirkcaldy. Susanna Kirkcaldy later worked as a servant of Jean Kennedy. They were both drowned on the 7 or 8 September 1589 crossing the Forth between Burntisland and Leith.

== Westminster Abbey ==
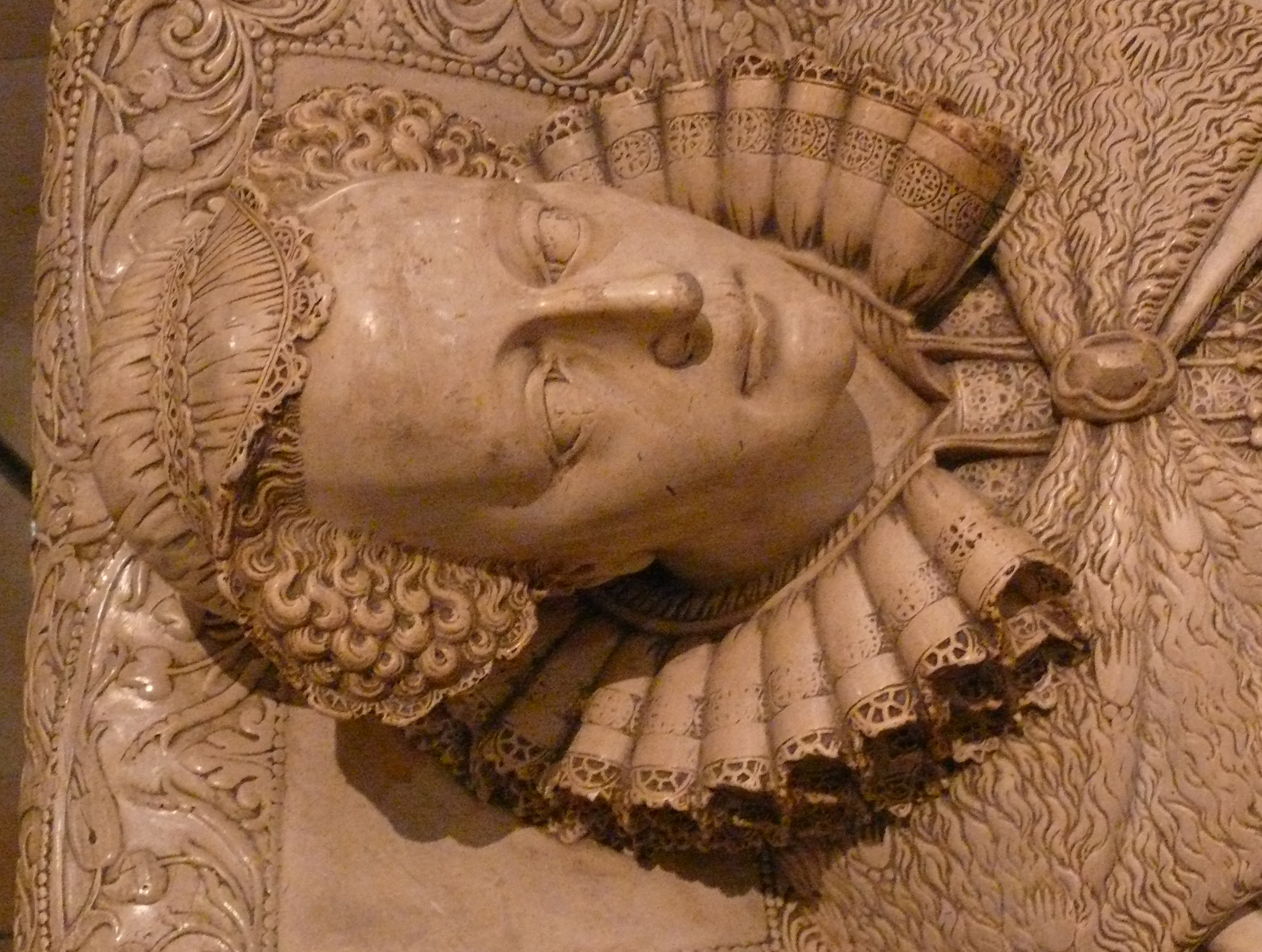
Detail of the replica monument at the National Museums of Scotland

Following the Union of the Crowns and his English coronation, James VI and I sent William Dethick to Peterborough with an embroidered velvet pall for his mother's grave in August 1603. In 1606, Cornelius Cure was commissioned to produce the monument to Mary, Queen of Scots, in Westminster Abbey.

King James issued a privy seal warrant for the tomb on 19 April 1607. This letter narrated that the Treasurer and the Earls of Northampton and Salisbury had made a contract with Cornelius Cure for the work, except the painting and gilding and the making of the iron grate or railing around the tomb. Cure was to paid by the exchequer at intervals detailed in the articles of his contract, and for the costs of the special stones delivered to him.

Cure was paid for supplying "touchstone and rauncestone", two kinds of alabaster. The monument was finished by his son William Cure the Younger, and painted and gilded by James Mauncy or Manuty (Manucci). He was an Italian servant or workman of John de Critz.

King James wrote to George Meriton, Dean of Peterborough on 28 September 1612 for Mary's body to be exhumed. At the grave in Peterborough there remained a structure called a "hearse", covered with a fabric pall. James ordered that the pall be used to cover Mary's coffin during the journey to Westminster. By custom the pall belonged to Peterborough Cathedral, so James offered a fee for its redemption. The Bishop of Coventry of Lichfield, Richard Neile, was to be in charge of the "translation of the body".

According to Luisa Carvajal y Mendoza, the bells were pealing as if they would crack when the body was brought to the Abbey. Mary was interred at Westminster on 8 October 1612. The Earl of Northampton presided over a procession and the burial, held in the evening to avoid the "concourse" of people.

The National Museums of Scotland has a replica of the monument. The epitaph was written by Henry Howard, 1st Earl of Northampton. The image of Mary may have been partly based on a portrait of Mary at Hardwick Hall. In 1610, a servant of the painter Rowland Lockey, an employee of the Earl of Shrewsbury, was paid for travelling to London with two porters carrying Mary's picture. The portrait was returned to Hardwick in 1613.
