= Death and funeral of Queen Mary =

Death and funeral of Queen Mary may refer to:

- Death and funeral of Mary I of England (1516–1558), queen of England and Ireland from 1553 to 1558
- Execution of Mary, Queen of Scots (1542–1587), queen of Scotland from 1542 to 1567, queen consort of France from 1559 to 1560
  - Funeral of Mary, Queen of Scots
- Death and funeral of Mary of Teck (1867–1953), queen consort of the United Kingdom from 1910 to 1936

== See also ==
- Funeral Sentences and Music for the Funeral of Queen Mary (for Mary II, d. 1694)
