= Execution of Mary, Queen of Scots =

1587 beheading of former Scottish queen

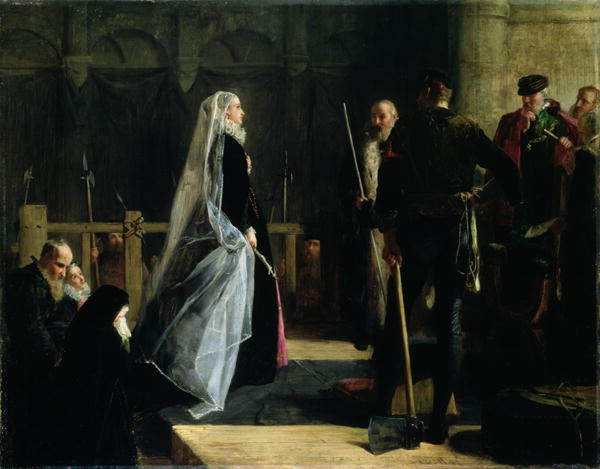
Execution of Mary, Queen of Scots by Robert Herdman. The painting portrays the ex-Queen as a youthful victim of political violence common in the Tudor period.

The execution of Mary, Queen of Scots took place on 8 February 1587 at Fotheringhay Castle, Northamptonshire, England. After nineteen years in English captivity following her forced abdication from the throne of Scotland, Mary was found guilty of plotting the assassination of her cousin, Elizabeth I, in what became known as the Babington Plot. The execution of Mary was the first legal execution of an anointed European monarch.

== Background ==
After her forced abdication in favour of her son James VI, and an unsuccessful attempt to take back her throne, Mary fled south to England, crossing the Solway Firth into England by fishing boat on 16 May 1568.

Initially hoping her cousin Elizabeth I of England would help her regain her throne, Mary instead was imprisoned for the murder of her English-born husband Henry Stuart, Lord Darnley though she was neither found guilty nor acquitted of the charge. Over the course of almost nineteen years, she was moved from castle to castle in England and kept under house arrest and under close watch by spies set up in her household by Elizabeth's advisors. Elizabeth saw her as a threat to her rule as Mary, the great-granddaughter of Henry VII of England through his daughter Margaret Tudor, was seen as a potential successor to the crown of England.

=== Trial ===
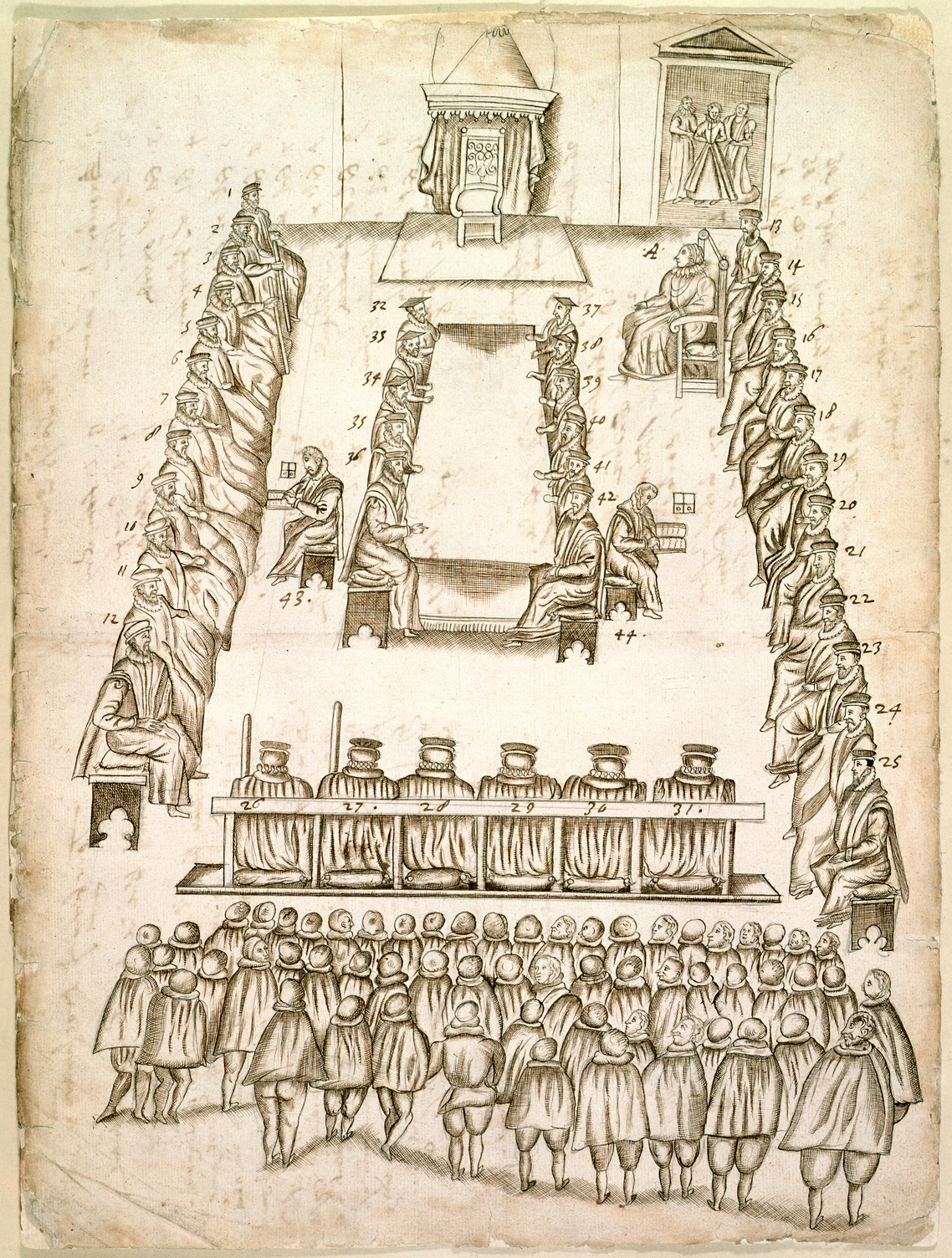
Contemporary drawing of the trial of Mary, Queen of Scots, October 1586

On 11 August 1586, after being implicated in the Babington Plot, Mary was arrested while out riding and taken to Tixall Hall in Staffordshire. In a successful attempt to entrap her, Walsingham had deliberately arranged for Mary's letters to be smuggled out of Chartley. Her secretaries Claude Nau and Gilbert Curle and the clerk Jérôme Pasquier were taken to London for questioning. Mary was misled into thinking her letters were secure, while in reality they were deciphered and read by Walsingham. From these letters it was clear that Mary had sanctioned the attempted assassination of Elizabeth.

Mary was moved to Fotheringhay Castle in a four-day journey ending on 25 September. In October, she was put on trial for treason under the Act for the Queen's Safety before a court of 36 noblemen. The proceedings were held in the Great Chamber, where an empty throne represented Queen Elizabeth and Mary was seated in a subordinate position.

Mary denied the charges, telling her triers, "Look to your consciences and remember that the theatre of the whole world is wider than the kingdom of England." She protested that she had been denied the opportunity to review the evidence, that her papers had been removed from her, that she was denied access to legal counsel, and that as a foreign anointed queen she had never been an English subject and therefore could not be convicted of treason.

She was convicted on 25 October and sentenced to death with only one commissioner, Lord Zouche, expressing any form of dissent. Nevertheless, Elizabeth hesitated to order her execution, even in the face of pressure from the English Parliament to carry out the sentence. She was concerned that the killing of a queen set a discreditable precedent and was fearful of the consequences, especially if, in retaliation, Mary's son, James, formed an alliance with the Catholic powers and invaded England.

James VI instructed his diplomats, William Keith of Delny, the Master of Gray, and Robert Melville, to try to stay his mother's execution. Henry III of France and Catherine de' Medici sent Pomponne de Bellièvre to plead for her life. Finally, on 1 February 1587, Elizabeth signed the death warrant, and entrusted it to William Davison, a privy councillor. On 3 February, ten members of the Privy Council of England, summoned by Cecil without Elizabeth's knowledge, decided to carry out the sentence at once.

== Last letter ==
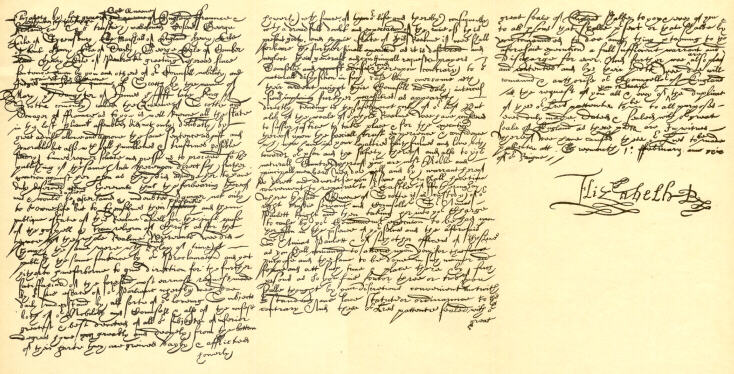
The death warrant of Mary, Queen of Scots, signed by Elizabeth I

In the days before the execution, Mary is said to have given Sir William Fitzwilliam of Milton a portrait of her son James VI which she had hanging on her bed head.

On the evening of 7 February 1587, Mary was told she was to be executed the next morning. She spent the last hours of her life in prayer and distributing her belongings to her household. She wrote her will, a note for her almoner Camille du Preau, and, two hours after midnight, a letter to Henry III of France.

In her letter to King Henry, now kept by the National Library of Scotland, Mary complained that she had not been given access to the paperwork needed to complete her will. She hoped her physician Dominique Bourgoing would be able to tell her story. She asked Henry III to pay her servants and she sent him two precious stones that served as talismans against illness. Mary wrote that she was condemned for her rights to the succession to the English crown and for her Catholic faith. Bourgoing described the night and morning in his Journal.

== Execution ==
A scaffold was erected in the Great Hall of the Castle and draped in black cloth. It was reached by two or three steps, and furnished with the block, a cushion for her to kneel on, and three stools for her and the earls of Shrewsbury and Kent, who were there to witness the execution. Mary was allowed only four attendants, her steward Andrew Melville, the physician Dominique Bourgoing, her surgeon Jacques Gervais, and her apothecary. In the morning, Mary asked for two of her ladies-in-waiting to accompany her on the scaffold.

The executioner and his assistant knelt before her and asked forgiveness, as it was typical for the executioner to request the pardon of the person being executed. Mary replied, "I forgive you with all my heart, for now, I hope, you shall make an end of all my troubles." Her ladies, Jane Kennedy and Elizabeth Curle, and the executioners helped Mary to take off her pomander beads and remove her outer garments, revealing a velvet petticoat and a pair of sleeves in crimson brown, with a black satin bodice and black trimmings. Some accounts say she was executed "all in red", the liturgical colour of martyrdom in the Catholic Church.

As she disrobed Mary smiled and said she "never had such grooms before... nor ever put off her clothes before such a company". She was blindfolded by Kennedy with a white veil embroidered in gold, knelt down on the cushion in front of the block on which she positioned her head, and stretched out her arms. Her last words were, In manus tuas, Domine, commendo spiritum meum ("Into thy hands, O Lord, I commend my spirit").

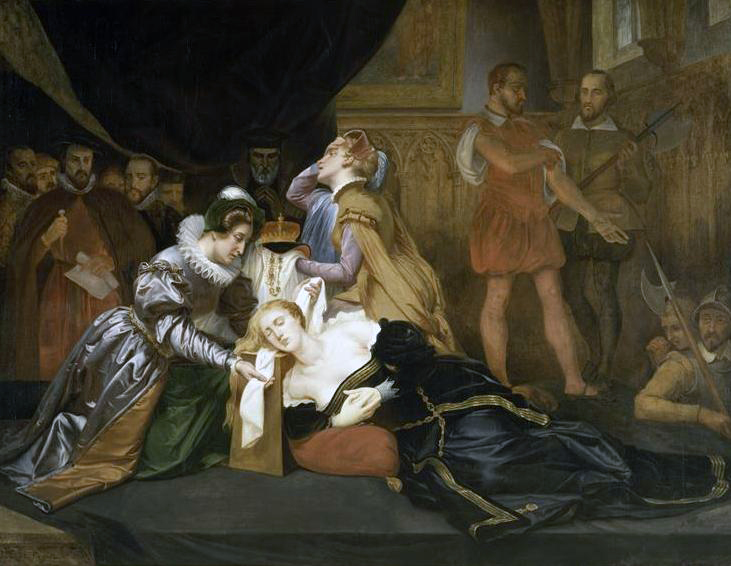
La mort de Marie Stuart - translated to The Death of Mary Stuart - by French painter Abel de Pujol

Mary was not beheaded with a single strike. The first blow missed her neck and struck the back of her head. The second blow severed the neck, except for a small bit of sinew, which the executioner cut through using the axe. Afterwards, he held her head aloft and declared "God save the Queen." At that moment, the auburn tresses in his hand turned out to be a wig and the head fell to the ground, revealing that Mary had very short, grey hair.

Cecil's nephew, who was present at the execution, reported to his uncle that after her death, "Her lips stirred up and down a quarter of an hour after her head was cut off". Reports mention that Mary's small pet dog emerged from hiding among her skirts. These details were not included in an abbreviated newsletter penned by a German Calvinist Emanuel Tomascon. Items supposedly worn or carried by Mary at her execution are of doubtful provenance; contemporary accounts state that all her clothing, the block, and everything touched by her blood was burnt in the fireplace of the Great Hall to obstruct relic hunters.

== Aftermath ==
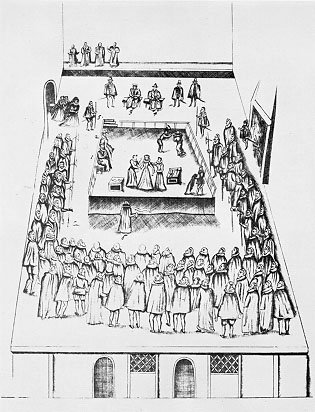
Robert Beale provided a sketch of the execution.

When the news of the execution reached Elizabeth, she became indignant and asserted that William Davison had disobeyed her instructions not to part with the warrant and that the Privy Council had acted without her authority. Elizabeth's vacillation and deliberately vague instructions gave her plausible deniability to attempt to avoid the direct stain of Mary's blood. Davison was arrested, thrown into the Tower of London, and found guilty of misprision. He was released 19 months later, after William Cecil and Francis Walsingham interceded on his behalf.

Roger Aston first broke the news to James VI and I, and Robert Carey was Elizabeth's official messenger. James VI bought mourning clothes for his household. Robert Carvyle, an English officer and message carrier based at Berwick-upon-Tweed was in Edinburgh in February 1587. He heard that James VI was sceptical that Elizabeth I was sorry for his mother's death. The townspeople of Edinburgh were angry and posted comments and poems called "libels" in the street, against James, his diplomats, and Elizabeth who was called a Jezebel.

A sketch of the execution was made by Robert Beale which he forwarded to the Privy Council. In subsequent years a number of engraved images of the execution and portraits of Mary were made and published by her Catholic sympathisers in Europe.

=== Funeral and first burial ===
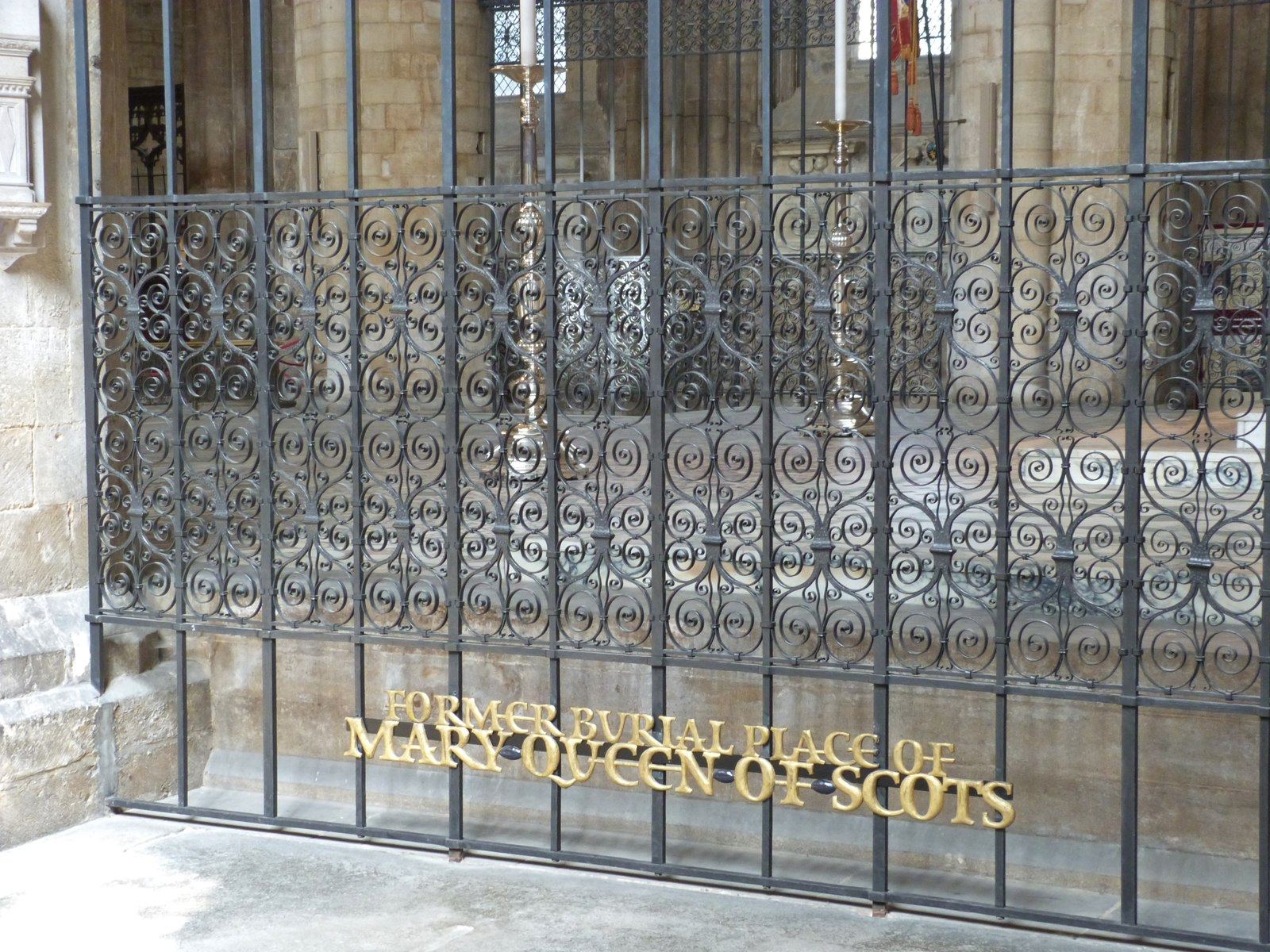
Railings at Peterborough Cathedral marking the former burial spot of Mary, Queen of Scots

Though she requested that she be buried in France, Mary's request was refused by Elizabeth. After an autopsy, her body was embalmed and left in a secure lead coffin until her burial in a Protestant service at Peterborough Cathedral in late July 1587. Her entrails, removed as part of the embalming process, were buried secretly within Fotheringhay Castle.

The procession from the Palace to the church was led by 100 or 120 poor women in black cloth gowns and white Holland linen head dresses (called "kerchers"), provided by John Fortescue. Their appearance was traditional or old-fashioned. Next followed those in mourning cloaks and mourning gowns. Andrew Noel carried the banner of Scotland. Ten women from Mary's household followed, wearing hoods with black taffeta at the front and white veils at the back in the French fashion. Most of the Scottish mourners from Mary's household left the cathedral before the service started, not wishing to attend a Protestant service. Gillis Mowbray or Barbara Mowbray remained in the cathedral with Andrew Melville.

William Wickham, Bishop of Lincoln, gave a sermon and a prayer. Banners were placed on the hearse, and symbolic objects including armour, a wooden sword, helmet and crown, were delivered from the hearse to the Bishop. Richard Fletcher, Dean of Peterborough, read the funeral service where Mary was buried, and then the broken rods of her officers were placed in the grave.

=== Reburial at Westminster Abbey ===
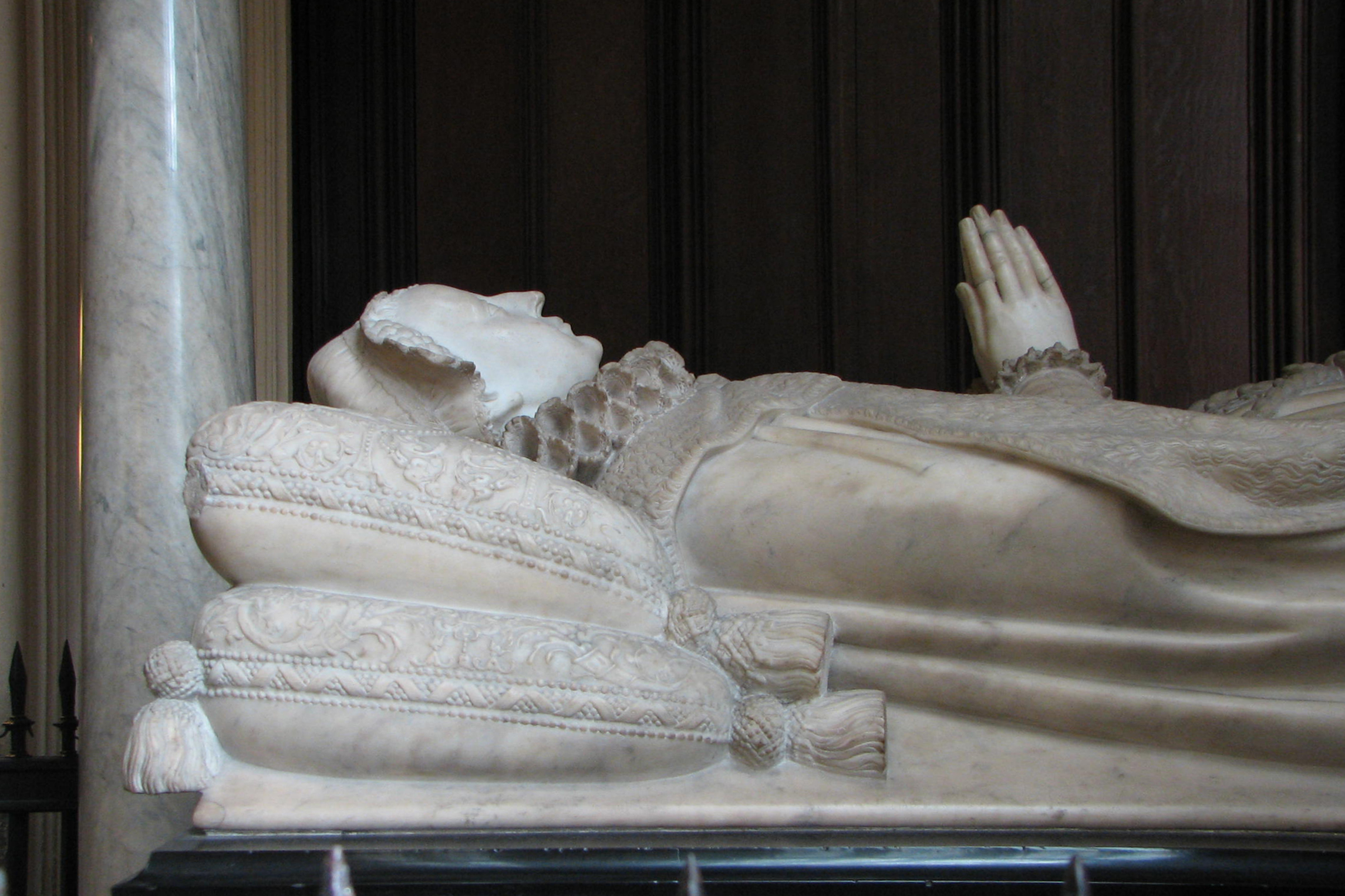
Mary's effigy at Westminster Abbey, by Cornelius Cure

In August 1603, following the Union of the Crowns and his English coronation, Mary's son James VI and I sent William Dethick to Peterborough with an embroidered velvet pall for his mother's grave.

In 1606, Cornelius Cure was commissioned to produce the monument to Mary in Westminster Abbey. He was paid for supplying "touchstone and rauncestone", two kinds of alabaster. The monument was finished by his son William Cure the Younger, and painted and gilded by James Manucci.

By order of royal warrant, dated 28 September 1612, Mary's body was exhumed and brought to London and reinterred at Westminster Abbey on 11 October 1612. The Earl of Northampton presided over a procession and the burial, held in the evening to avoid the "concourse" of people. King James had a marble tomb commissioned for her in the south aisle of the Lady Chapel, opposite the tomb of Elizabeth I.

== See also ==
- List of botched executions
- Execution of Charles I of England, Mary's grandson and the only other British monarch to be executed
- Execution of Louis XVI, King of France deposed in the French Revolution
- Murder of the Romanov family, extrajudicial execution of the Russian Tsar Nicolas II and his family by the Bolsheviks
