= Jane Kennedy =

Jane Kennedy may refer to:

- Jane Kennedy (courtier) (died 1589), Scottish courtier
- Jane Kennedy (actress) (born 1964), Australian actress and comedian
- Jane Kennedy (politician) (born 1958), British Labour Party Member of Parliament

== See also ==
- Jayne Kennedy (born 1951), American model, actress and sportscaster
