= John Mowbray of Barnbougle =

Scottish landowner

John Mowbray of Barnbougle was a Scottish landowner and supporter of Mary, Queen of Scots.

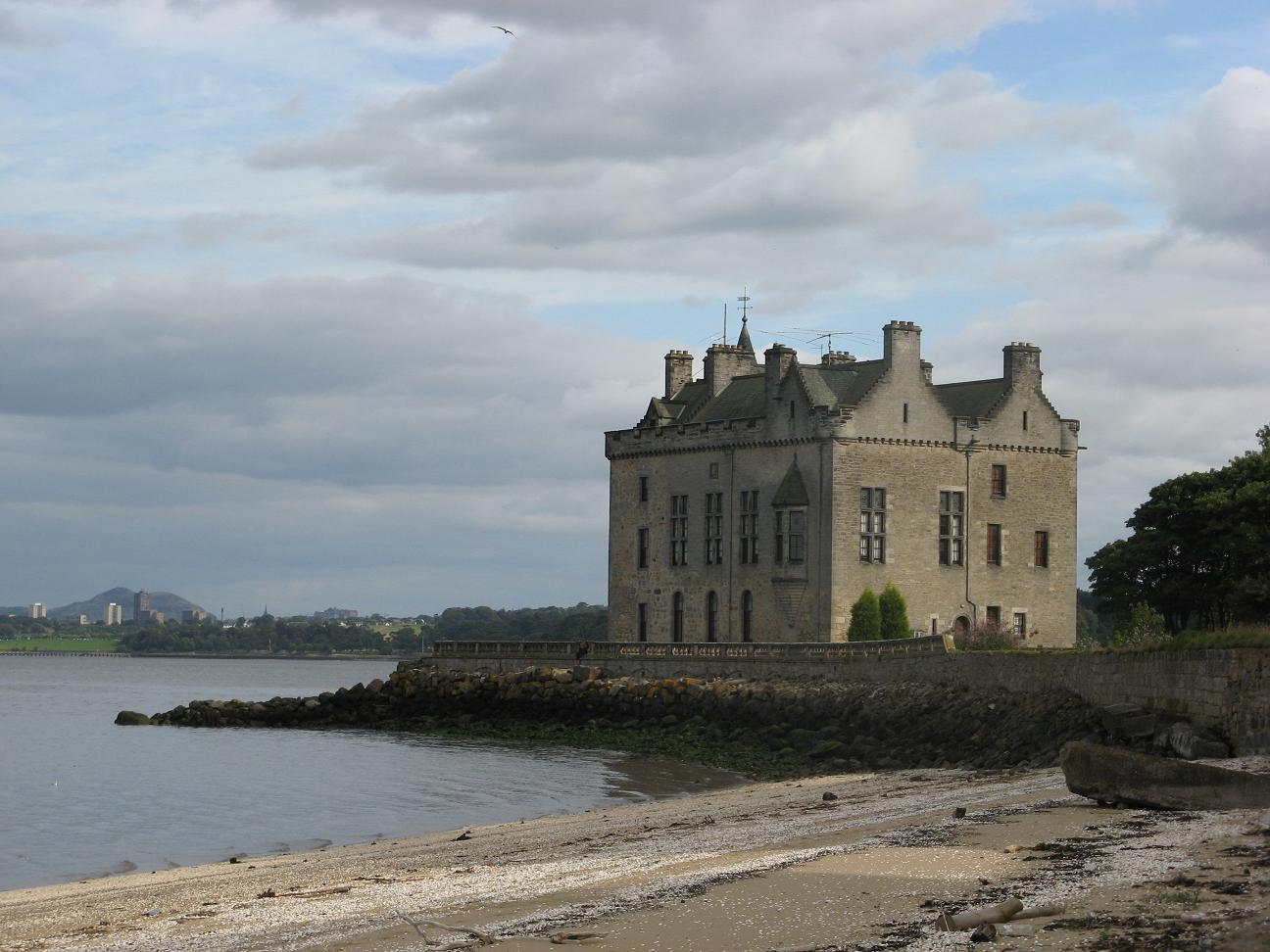
Barnbougle Castle

== Family background ==
John Mowbray's father was born Robert Barton, a son of Robert Barton of Over Barnton, Comptroller of Scotland. He married an heiress, Barbara Mowbray, daughter of John Mowbray of Barnbougle, and took the surname Mowbray. He died in 1538. John Mowbray was a son of his second wife, Elizabeth Crawford.

== Career ==
John Mowbray's lands included Barnbougle Castle close to Cramond Island near Edinburgh. The surname is also written as "Moubray". French sources calls him the Sieur Bouquel and the Baron de Barnestrudgal.

Mowbray claimed a right to capture Portuguese ships according to old "Letters of Marque" granted to the Barton family and Andrew Barton. The rights were suppressed by the Parliament of Scotland in 1563. He was with Mary, Queen of Scots in France in 1556.

He was one of the jurors who acquitted the Earl of Bothwell of the murder of Lord Darnley. In March 1567, Mary entrusted her son, the future James VI and I, to the keeping of the Earl of Mar at Stirling Castle. Mowbray was one of the witnesses to her written directions received at the gate of the castle on 20 March. On 11 June 1567, Mary and the Earl of Bothwell were besieged at Borthwick Castle. Mary's remaining supporters on the Privy Council sent Mowbray to Borthwick to challenge the Conferederate Lords.

After the "lang siege" of Edinburgh Castle, at the end of the Marian Civil War in August 1573, Mowbray presented a paper to Regent Morton with offers to save the life of his brother-in-law, William Kirkcaldy of Grange, including £20,000 worth of the jewels of Mary, Queen of Scots, remaining in her supporter's hands.

== Captive queen ==
Mowbray travelled to London and Paris and corresponded with Francis Walsingham. Mary sent the French ambassador in London, Guillaume de l'Aubespine de Châteauneuf, a newly devised cipher alphabet after receiving his message delivered by Mowbray. Two of his daughters worked for Mary, Queen of Scots in England.

According to a letter of the French diplomat Courcelles, and Adam Blackwood's Le Mort de Royne d'Escosse, Mowbray went to London in October 1586 to plead with Elizabeth I for Mary's life and the release of Claude Nau and Curle. Courcelles said that James VI decided not to give Mowbray letters for Elizabeth pleading for Mary as it was not yet clear that Mary was condemned.

After Mary's execution on 8 February 1587, he tried to secure the release of her servants, including his daughters, before Mary's funeral.

== Marriages and children ==
His wife, Elizabeth or Elspeth Kirkcaldy, was a sister of William Kirkcaldy of Grange (died 1573). Their children included:

- Robert Mowbray. During the Marian Civil War, in 1572, Robert attempted to capture Dundas Castle. John Mowbray was imprisoned and Barnbougle was garrisoned by the King's party. Robert Mowbray sold Barnbougle to Thomas Hamilton, 1st Earl of Haddington in around 1614.
- Francis Mowbray (died 1593), an intriguer who offered to serve Mary, Queen of Scots, in 1580, and carried letters.
- Agnes Mowbray, who married Robert Crichton of Eliock
- Elizabeth Mowbray, who married Archibald Napier of Merchiston and Edinbellie. They built Lauriston Castle.
- Marion Mowbray
- Barbara Mowbray (1556-1616), who married Gilbert Curle, a secretary of Mary, Queen of Scots. She died in Antwerp.
- Gillis Mowbray, who served Mary, Queen of Scots, and is said to have been the owner of the Penicuik Jewels.
