= Gillis Mowbray =

Gillis Mowbray or Gilles Moubray was a servant of Mary, Queen of Scots, associated with a small collection of jewellery held by the National Museums of Scotland, known as the "Penicuik jewels". Her first name is also spelled "Geillis" or "Geilles".

== Career ==
Gillis was a daughter of John Mowbray of Barnbougle and Elizabeth or Elspeth Kirkcaldy, a sister of the soldier William Kirkcaldy of Grange. When William Kirkcaldy of Grange was about to be executed in 1573, Gillis Mowbray's father, the Laird of Barnbougle, who was Kirkcaldy's brother-in-law, wrote to Regent Morton to plead for his life, offering money, service, and royal jewels worth £20,000 Scots. Mary made a will in 1577, bequeathing 100 Écu to a "Gilles", probably another member of her household.

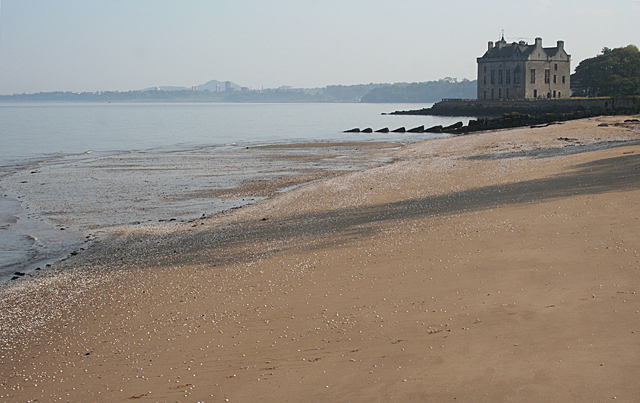
Barnbougle Castle

Gillis Mowbray travelled to London in 1585, hoping for permission to join her sister Barbara in Mary's household. Mary wrote to Francis Walsingham for a passport for Gillis Mowbray on 30 September 1585. Walsingham agreed that Gillis could join the household, but mentioned his reservations in a letter to Amias Paulet, wishing that he and Queen Elizabeth had advance knowledge of her arrival in England and ordering that any women servants who intended to leave Mary's service when Gillis joined the household should be lodged apart for a time so they could not be given secret messages to carry.

Barbara Mowbray married Gilbert Curle, one of the secretaries of Mary, Queen of Scots at Tutbury Castle on 24 October. Paulet described Barbara Mowbray as Mary's "principal gentlewoman". Shortly after the wedding, in November, Gillis joined Mary's household, travelling first to Derby.

Her position at first was maid to Curle's sister Elizabeth, and she was later described as one of Mary's gentlewomen. In February 1586, Mary had discussions with Jean Arnault de Cherelles, the secretary of the French ambassador, at Chartley in the presence of Amias Powlet. She said that Gillis Mowbray had told her that James VI had sent a rich jewel to a Danish princess, a token of marriage negotiations. Gillis had heard the story when the Danish ambassadors were in Scotland before she left for London.

Mowbray remained at Chartley while Queen Mary was taken to Tixall. She was subsequently one of four damoiselles remaining with Mary, the others being Jean Kennedy, Renée Beauregard, and Elspeth or Elizabeth Curle.

Mary bequeathed Geillis Mowbray jewels, money, and clothes, including a pair of gold bracelets, a crystal jewel set in gold, and a red enamelled "oxe" of gold. She kept Mary's virginals, a kind of harpsichord, and her cittern.

At Mary's funeral, Gillis or Barbara Mowbray, or both sisters, remained in Peterborough Cathedral with Andrew Melville of Garvock, when Mary's other household servants left during the Protestant service and waited in the cloisters.

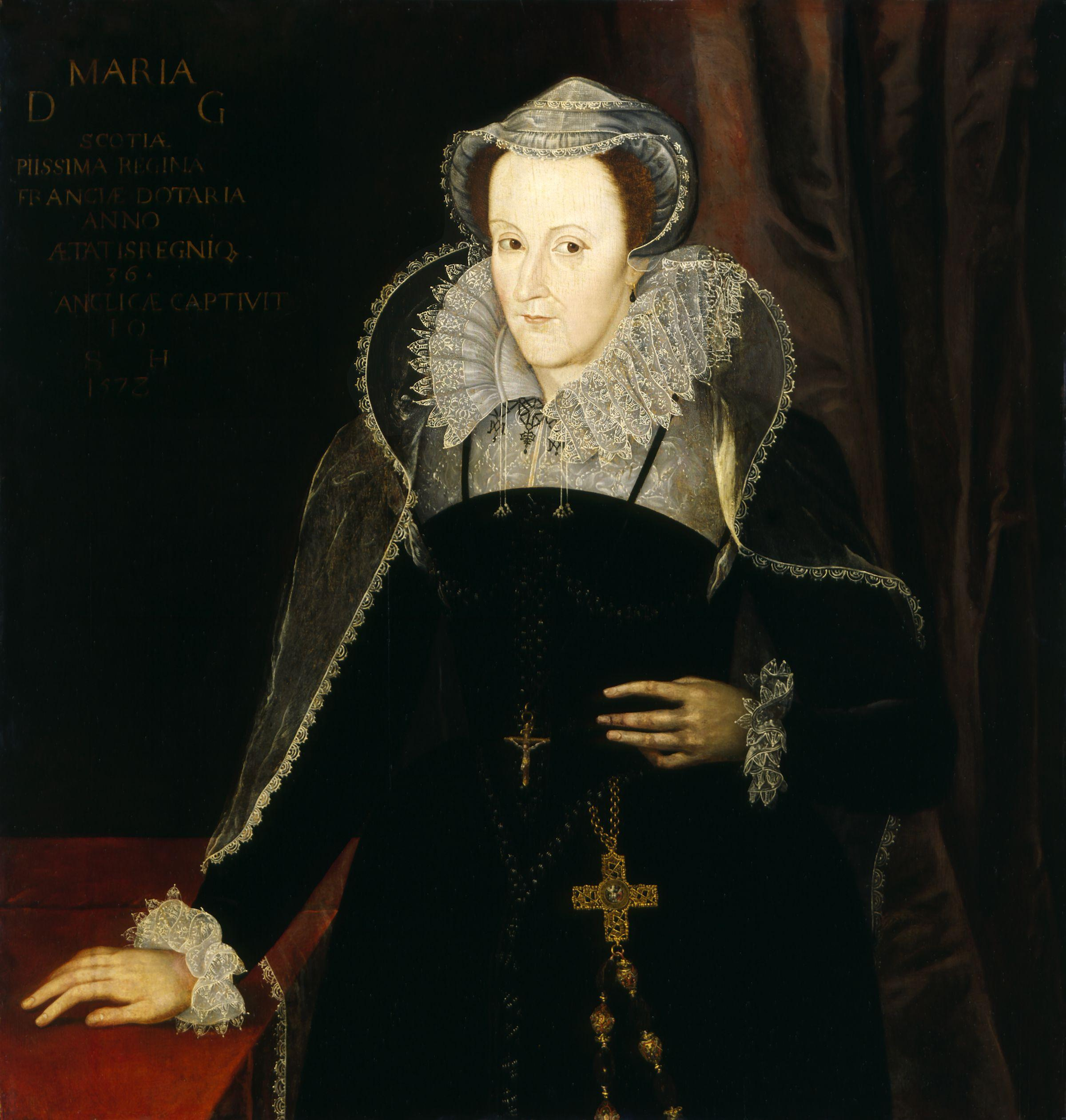
Mary, Queen of Scots gave some of her jewels to Gillis Mowbray

According to a list made in 1589, Gillis Mowbray (but perhaps Barbara), and her sister Jean Mowbray received pensions from Spain paid in gold ducats.

In 1603 Gillis' half-brother Francis Mowbray fell to his death from Edinburgh Castle.

== Penicuik jewels ==
Gillis Mowbray married John Smith of Barnton and was an ancestor of the Clerk of Penicuik family. Their son was John Smith of Grothill (at Craigleith), and their daughter Gillis or Egidia Smith married William Gray of Pittendrum. Their daughter Mary Gray married John Clerk, who bought the Penicuik estate in 1646.

In 1622, Gillis's husband John Smith built the house in Edinburgh now called "Lady Stair's House". The exact details of the family tree may be unclear. A 1613 charter held by the National Records of Scotland says that "Giles Moubray" was the spouse of William Smyth in Lymphoy.

It is thought that Mary gave jewels to Gillis Mowbray, known today as the "Penicuik jewels" and displayed at the National Museum of Scotland. The jewels include a pendant with a miniature portraits of Mary and James VI, and gold filigree pomander beads (for perfume) and spacer beads, now strung as a necklace.

Filigree gold beads made to hold "musk" perfume were used in bracelets, necklaces, and rosaries. Mary had a little "carcan" necklace with small grains of gold filled with perfume with little gold grains as spacer beads known as entredeux, and a paternoster or rosary with 36 beads for perfume with matching headdress and cottoire (a chain descending from a girdle). Her jeweller in France, Robert Mangot, had made similar gold beads for her. Mangot made beads called "gerbes", the word appears as "jarbis" in Scots for gold entredeux spacer beads. A crucifix and rosary with filigree beads, associated by tradition with Mary, was in the collection of a Newcastle antiquary, George Mennell, in the 19th century.

Possibly, the Penicuik beads may once been a pair of bracelets, an item in Mary's bequest to Gillis. Mary's inventories mention several pairs of bracelets, including a pair suitable for perfume, and seventy large gold "grains" made in two pieces to hold perfume. In 1577, Mary's secretary Claude Nau asked his brother in Paris to buy bracelets made in the latest fashion.
