= Francis Mowbray =

Scottish intriguer

Francis Mowbray or Moubray (died 1603) was a Scottish intriguer.

== Career ==
Francis Mowbray was a son of John Mowbray, Laird of Barnbougle Castle and Elspeth or Elizabeth Kirkcaldy, daughter of James Kirkcaldy.

His sisters, or half-sisters, Barbara Mowbray and Gillis Mowbray were servants of Mary, Queen of Scots in England. Barbara married the queen's secretary Gilbert Curle and lived in the Spanish Netherlands. Gillis Mowbray is associated with the jewels of Mary, Queen of Scots. Another sister, Agnes Mowbray (died 1595), married Robert Crichton of Eliok.

He met Francis Walsingham in December 1580. Some intercepted letters sent to the French ambassador Michel de Castelnau showed that he wished to serve Elizabeth I. Francis was probably the son of Laird of Barnbougle who carried letters between Mr Archibald Douglas and his nephew Richard Douglas in 1587.

He spent some time at the court of Isabella Clara Eugenia in Brussels.

In July 1592 the English ambassador Robert Bowes reported that Mowbray had brought letters to Scotland from Spain. He told Bowes that he been in a Spanish prison on suspicion of spying and preventing an attack on English shipping. Archibald Douglas had given him money. Mowbray told him of plans to send Spanish gold to Scotland to finance rebellion. Bowes doubted the stories of elusive Spanish gold, having heard that Philip II was not interested. Bowes recommended Mowbray to William Cecil as someone who could do some service for England as he was sent abroad on the affairs of Catholics, but he wanted more money than he had previously received.

On 14 April 1596 he wounded William Schaw, the royal master of work, with a rapier, apparently in a family feud. He spent some time with Walter Scott of Buccleuch, though denounced at the horn as a rebel. He told Robert Bowes about a league or contract between some border lairds against the Octavians. Mowbray was known to be an agent for the Earl of Huntly and Lord Sanquhar. In December 1596 he took the author of a newsletter sent to James Hudson to "a tailor's house in the Cowgate" to meet Huntly, Sir George Home and Sir Robert Melville.

In August 1601 he was imprisoned in Edinburgh Castle and interrogated by the Lord Chancellor and Sir George Home about a letter in cipher code and whether he had any secret dealings with Sir Robert Cecil. Mowbray declared his loyalty to James VI and denied knowledge of the coded letter. Cecil wrote to the Master of Gray in October that Mowbray was not in his employ, he had heard that Mowbray had been tortured with the boot, a device for crushing the leg. On 5 October it was agreed that Mowbray and his servant George Brock would go to Rossend Castle in the custody of Sir Robert Melville and then leave Scotland.

Roger Aston wrote that Mowbray was free in November and waiting at Prestonpans for a ship to England. Mowbray wrote to Cecil from Edinburgh complaining about the Scottish merchant and poet John Burrell in London who ridiculed him in verse and now had a sonnet against him published. Mowbray enclosed a copy of the poem and wanted the poet put in prison.

== Mowbray and Archdeacon ==
In October 1602, in England, an Italian called Daniel Archdeacon accused him of treason against James VI of Scotland. Archdeacon was from Piedmont and used to teach Italian and fencing to young gentlemen in London. He had hoped to come Scotland, with the recommendation of the Laird of Wemyss and teach Prince Henry. His acquaintance included Thomas Leedes of Wappingthorne, who he had lent £30.

Both men were sent to Edinburgh, and it was decided that, for this accusation of treason, they would fight a duel or combat at Holyrood Palace in January 1603. James VI bought swords and daggers for the combatants from an Edinburgh armourer William Vaus, and ordered the master carpenter James Murray to construct a barrier, or stage for the fight, outside Holyrood Palace. This plan was abandoned after a message came from England that Mowbray's treason could be proved.

The English letter writer John Chamberlain described Daniel Archdeacon as "a little pigmee Italian fencer", "the dwarfe Daniell" and a "little dandelot". He heard an incorrect rumour that they fought the judicial combat and both died.

Mowbray and Archdeacon were imprisoned or "warded" in Edinburgh Castle. Witnesses against him, Scottish men from London, were interviewed by the king. These included Walter Mowbray and John Anderson, who had been bankrupted and were not considered reliable. A French diplomat, the Baron de Tour interviewed Archdeacon, and found him to be both "a witty man and a cunning corrupted person." De Tour took the idea of plot seriously, and advised James VI that Mowbray should be tortured, rather than fight a duel with the Italian.

Mowbray was questioned on 12 December 1602 and a lengthy statement was drawn up. It notes that he was uncle to the laird of Barnbougle. He said he met Archdeacon because they both served the Earl of Argyll. Archdeacon had asked him about becoming a fencing and languages teacher to Prince Henry. He thought of going to Spain and taking Archdeacon with him. Mowbray explained his disappointment that his nephew's ward and marriage had passed from William Schaw to Laird of Easter Wemyss, but claimed not to have spoken against the king because of it, or to have criticised James VI for his reaction to the execution of Mary, Queen of Scots. Archdeacon had told them he had used a metaphor of sarks (shirts), coats, and skins about the king and his mother, which Mowbray denied.

On 30 January Mowbray escaped from Edinburgh Castle using a rope made from blankets but fell down the castle craigs injuring his head, either because the makeshift rope was too short, or because the castle guard saw him climbing down and shook him off the rope. He died the next day. On the king's orders his body was hanged, drawn and quartered, and his body was displayed on the four ports or gates of Edinburgh.

King James wrote that Mowbray "was to all appearance seduced by Satan, who was the first motioner of these his devilish enterprises".

King James gave Archdeacon a gold medallion in March 1606.
