= John Aylmer (bishop) =

English bishop (1521–1594)

The Right Reverend John Aylmer
- Bishop of London
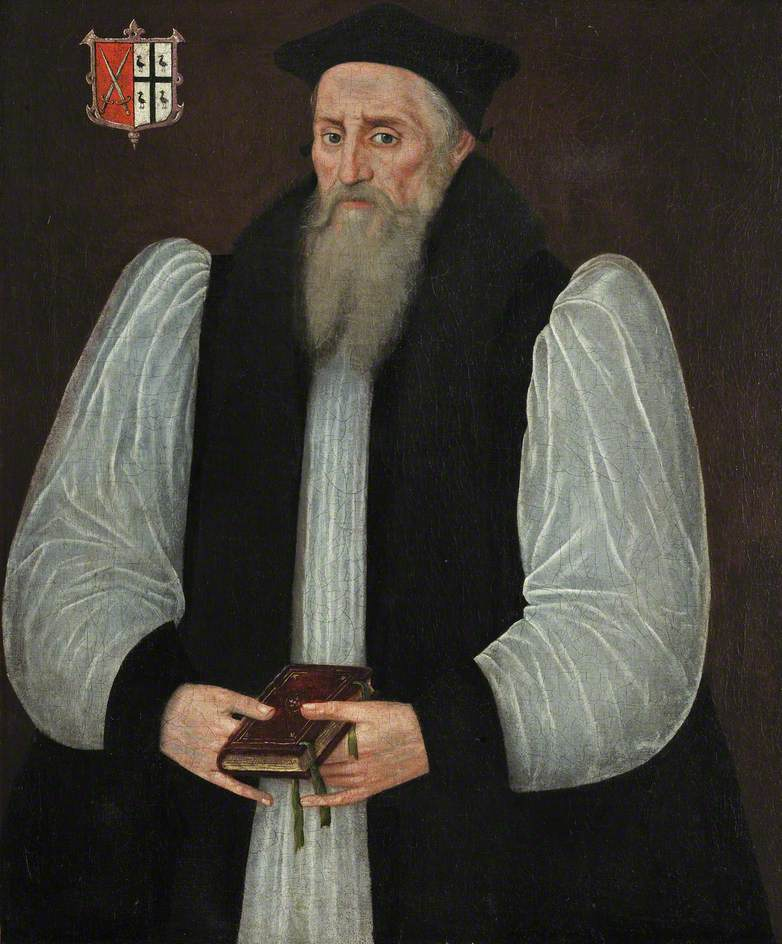
- Church: Church of England
- Province: Canterbury
- Diocese: London
- Elected: 12 March 1577
- Term ended: 3 June 1594
- Predecessor: Edwin Sandys
- Successor: Richard Fletcher
- Previous posts: Archdeacon of Lincoln; 1562–1577; Archdeacon of Stow; 1553–1554 & 1559–1562

Orders
- Consecration: 24 March 1577

Personal details
- Born: 1521 Tivetshall St Margaret, Norfolk
- Died: 3 June 1594 (aged 72-73) Fulham Palace, London
- Buried: St Paul's Cathedral, London
- Denomination: Anglican
- Profession: Scholar
- Education: Queens' College, Cambridge

John Aylmer (Ælmer or Elmer; 1521 – 3 June 1594) was an English bishop, constitutionalist and a Greek scholar.

== Early life and career ==
He was born at Aylmer Hall, Tilney St. Lawrence, Norfolk. While still a boy, his precocity was noticed by Henry Grey, 3rd Marquess of Dorset, later 1st Duke of Suffolk, who sent him to Cambridge, where he seems to have become a fellow of Queens' College. About 1541 he was made chaplain to the duke, and tutor of Greek to his daughter, Lady Jane Grey.

His first preferment was to the archdeaconry of Stow, in the diocese of Lincoln, but his opposition in Convocation to the doctrine of transubstantiation led to his deprivation and to his flight into Switzerland. While there he wrote a reply to John Knox's famous Blast against the Monstrous Regiment of Women, under the title of An Harborowe for Faithfull and Trewe Subjects, etc., and assisted John Foxe in translating the Acts of the Martyrs into Latin. On the accession of Elizabeth I he returned to England. "God is English", Aylmer proclaimed in 1558, attempting to fill his parishioners with piety and patriotism. In 1559 he resumed the Stow archdeaconry, and in 1562 he obtained that of Lincoln. He was a member of the convocation of 1563, which reformed and settled the doctrine and discipline of the Church of England.

In 1577 he was consecrated Bishop of London, and while in that position made himself notorious by his harsh treatment of all who differed from him on ecclesiastical questions, whether Puritan or Roman Catholic. Various efforts were made to remove him to another see. He is frequently assailed in the famous Marprelate Tracts, and is characterised as "Morrell," the bad shepherd, in Edmund Spenser's Shepheard's Calendar (July). His reputation as a scholar hardly balances his inadequacy as a bishop in the transitional time in which he lived. His Life was written by John Strype (1701).

He died in 1594 and was buried in St Paul's Cathedral. He had several children. His eldest son Samuel Aylmer was the High Sheriff of Suffolk for 1626. His eldest daughter Judith was the paternal grandmother of Sir Thomas Lynch, thrice Governor of Jamaica.

== Works ==
"Aylmer, like John Ponet and Stephen Gardiner before him, is an important figure in the story of the reception of classical mixed government in Tudor England." John Aylmer wrote his work An harborowe for faithful and trewe subiectes (1559), to defend the female monarchy of Elizabeth I associating "the rule of boyes and women, or effeminate persons" and on another basis; "that cytie is at pits brinks, wherein magistrate ruleth lawes, and not the lawes the magistrate: What could any kyng in Israell do in that common wealth, besides the pollycie appointed by Moyses?". His effort to familiarise his fellow countrymen with the "strange and alluring vocabulary of politics", introducing them to the classical forms and terminology, must be viewed as secondary to this primary goal.

Aylmer nevertheless described England as not "a mere monarchy, as some for lack of consideration think, nor a mere oligarchy, nor democracy, but a rule mixed of all these." ^{1} He goes on to say that in the mixed state, "each one of these have or should have like authority." He argued that in the king-in-Parliament, or, in Elizabeth's case, the queen-in-Parliament, was not the "image" of a mixed state "but the thing in deed." It was in Parliament that one found the three estates: "the king or queen, which representeth the monarchy; the noble men which be the aristocracy; and the burgesses and knights the democracy." As he says, "In like manner, if the Parliament use their privileges: the king can ordain nothing without them." Parliamentary restraint of a queen's feminine vices would, according to Aylmer, ameliorate the disadvantages of female monarchy.

His work, particularly his characterisation of England as a mixed monarchy, would be important to later English constitutionalists.

== Notes ==
Church of England titles
| Preceded by Edwin Sandys | Bishop of London; 1577–1594 | Succeeded by Richard Fletcher |
