= Andrew Melville of Garvock =

Scottish courtier

Andrew Melville of Garvock (died 1617) was a Scottish courtier and servant of Mary, Queen of Scots.

== Family background ==
Andrew Melville was a younger son of John Melville of Raith in Fife and Helen Napier of Merchiston. His older brother James Melville of Halhill wrote a famous political memoir. Another brother, Robert Melville, was a noted politician and administrator.

He was an uncle of the poet Elizabeth Melville.

Garvock was an estate to the east of Dunfermline. The House of Garvock was on a hill. It was demolished at the end of the 18th century. The last vestiges of the building included a massive wall with a stair.

== Servant of Mary, Queen of Scots ==
Andrew Melville was sent by his elder brother Robert Melville to Mary, Queen of Scots when she was imprisoned at Lochleven Castle. He brought her jewels, one piece from the Edinburgh goldsmith James Mosman and other items from her cabinet at Holyrood Palace. Subsequently he carried three gowns to Mary at Carlisle Castle in England. He joined Mary's household in England, and became the chief domestic administrator, the queen's Master of Household, succeeding Andrew Beaton.

In December 1581 Mary asked for six horses for riders to attend her. She was allowed four horses for her men to accompany her coach, and they were not allowed to carry pistols, called "daggs". The appointed riders were Melville, Claude Nau, Gilbert Curll, and Bastian Pagez. In January 1585 he received silver plate from Elizabeth's jewel house for Mary's use at Tutbury Castle.

Melville was one of the witnesses of a contract made at the wedding of Mary's Scottish secretary Gilbert Curll and Barbara Mowbray on 23 October 1585. Mary's keeper Amias Paulet noted that Melville disliked the French secretary Claude Nau. Although Melville seemed to keep himself aloof from the household, for security reasons Paulet wanted him, Elizabeth Pierrepont, and the groom Jérôme Pasquier removed from Mary's household. He suggested to Francis Walsingham that Melville should be sent to Mr Trentham's or later, to Mr Bagott's.

Melville married one of the queen's attendants, Jean Kennedy. He was suspected of involvement in plots in October 1586, and his family in Scotland were glad to hear he was found innocent. Melville was brought from Chartley Castle to rejoin the household at Fotheringhay in October 1586, with a daughter of Bastian Pagez, and his personal servant.

William Cecil required Melville and the queen's principal gentlewomen to sign and seal detailed orders for the queen's execution. At Fotheringhay, Mary spoke to him after leaving her chamber on the way to the great hall for her execution, giving him instructions and messages for her son James VI of Scotland. Another narrative of the execution says that Melville broke down at the burden of this charge and knelt before Mary on the way to the great hall, wailing loudly. Mary told him to be of good cheer and bade him farewell with a kiss.

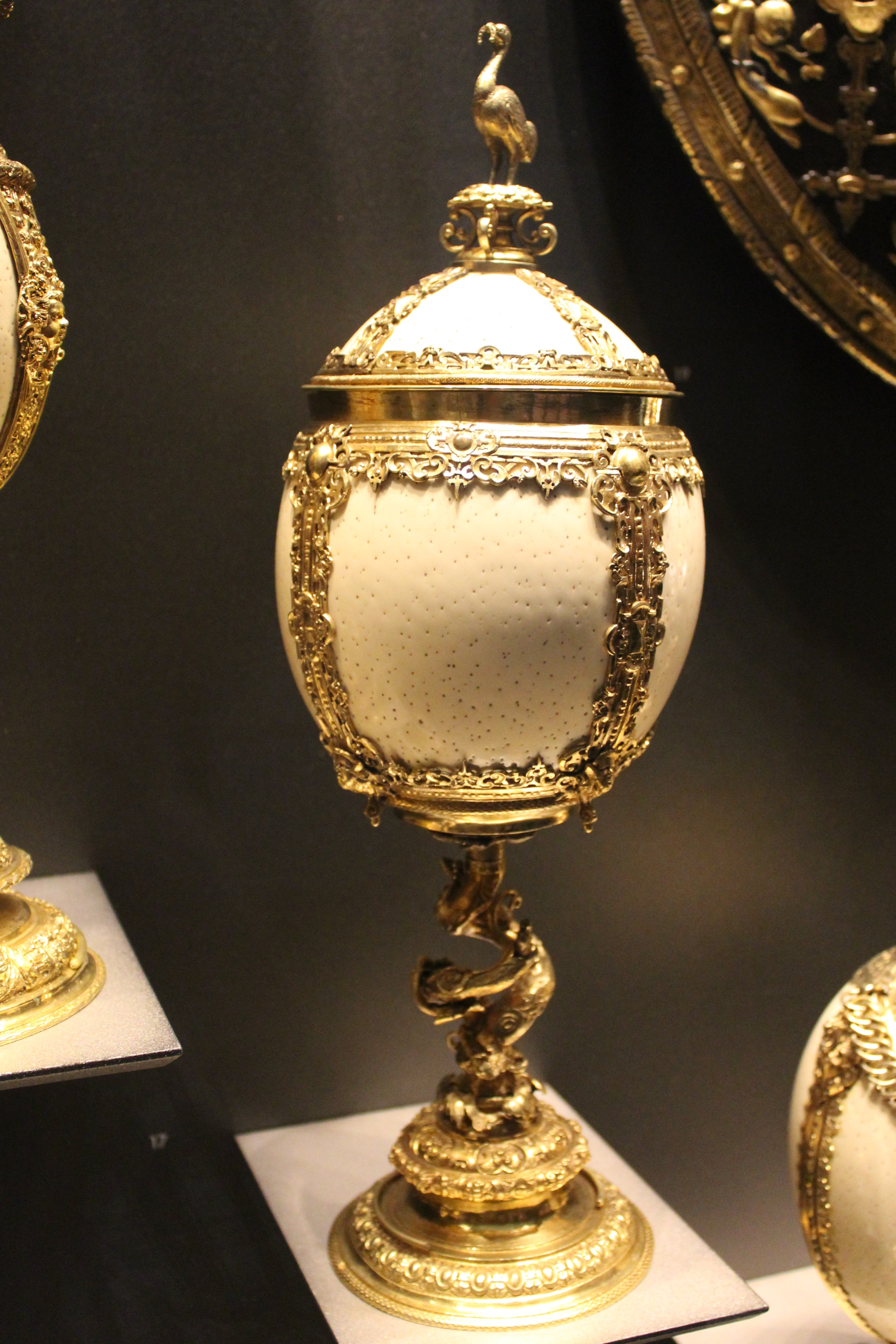
A Renaissance style ostrich egg cup, 1570s, made in Prague Waddesdon Bequest, British Museum

After Mary's execution, Andrew Melville, Jean Kennedy, and the queen's physician were placed in joint custody of Mary's remaining jewels and silver plate. Melville was in charge of the embroidery for a bed that Mary had made, and surviving pieces are now known as the "Oxburgh Hangings". Mary had asked Andrew to take the bed hangings and some of her other belongings back to Scotland and her son James VI after her execution, including portraits of her ancestors and a piece of unicorn horn. In April 1603, the secretary of Anne of Denmark, William Fowler recorded some of the emblems or devices embroidered by Mary on bed curtains at Holyrood Palace.

While still at Fotheringhay, Melville wrote a note for Amias Paulet to settle the affairs of some of the household. Some of the servants were owed money by the French ambassador. The surgeon and Renée de Rallay, called Beauregard, had left money with Claude Nau which had been confiscated. Beauregard requested the return of her aunt Mademoiselle Rallay's will and testament. Elizabeth Curll hoped for a payment, and Bastian Pagez and his wife Christine Hog wanted accommodation for their seven children. Paulet forwarded Melville's note to William Cecil, and favourable answers were made.

Melville was allowed to choose who and how many of the household would attend the queen's funeral at Peterborough Cathedral. Only Melville attended the final sermon. It was customary for the officers of the household to break symbolic staffs of office over their head and put them in the grave, and Melville may have done this.

Melville was detained in England for a time. His brother James Melville wrote to him in October 1587 saying that their mother hoped to see him before she died. and James VI asked his ambassador Archibald Douglas to secure his release. Douglas' services were not needed, as he found that Melville had already been released.

== Master of Household to James VI ==
Andrew returned to Scotland. In May 1588 an English diplomat Richard Wigmore went to Scotland and was instructed to discover any secret messages that Mary had sent to James VI. Jean Kennedy was drowned in a ferry accident on the Forth in 1589. The accident was blamed on a storm or on the drunken incompetence of the sailors, but also was drawn into ideas of witchcraft and malevolence current during the North Berwick witch trials.

Andrew Melville continued to serve as a Master of the Royal Household after the death of his wife. His staff included William Henderson as marshall and John Windegates as caterer. Melville was given £200 Scots for clothes to attend the coronation of Anne of Denmark in May 1590. Guests at the coronation, like the Laird of Arbuthnott, were asked to bring gifts of food to the coronation, such as beef, mutton, wild fowls, and venison. They were asked to have the food delivered to Andrew Melville at the old royal mint in Edinburgh.

Melville received a pension from the lands of Crossraguel Abbey, and in June 1590 his servants James Boswall and David Ardeis witnessed his receipt for payment. In October 1590 he made an inventory of silver plate used in the king and queen's household with Jerome Bowie, the Master of Wine Cellar. This includes two silver ships or nefs and an ostrich egg cup, described as an "ostrix eg coupe garnessit in silver dowble overgilt".

In 1591 he was on hand to protect the King at Holyroodhouse when he was surprised by Francis Stewart, Earl of Bothwell. Melville had a house on the north side of Holyrood close. He armed himself and entered the palace through the Abbey using a secret passage. Melville and the other Masters of Household complained of planned economies in the royal household and asked for greater remuneration due to their onerous duties.

In July 1594 he and his brothers entertained the Danish and German ambassadors who had arrived for the baptism of Prince Henry. In August, he received £214 from money managed by the goldsmith Thomas Foulis, for the expenses of the King's household, in addition to £8,718 Scots which he had been given in 1593.

Melville continued to correspond with Bess of Hardwick, who had been Mary's keeper, and her family. In 1607 he sent news of the trial of Margaret Hartsyde a servant of Anne of Denmark accused of stealing her jewels. In November 1608 he wrote to the Earl of Shrewsbury mentioning an earthquake felt at Garvock. In that year he hosted Louis Frederick, Duke of Württemberg-Montbéliard during his visit to Scotland.

He died on 13 April 1617.

It has been suggested that Andrew Melville preserved a manuscript of the Scottish version of the history of Mary's times composed by John Lesley, Bishop of Ross.

== Marriages and children ==
His first wife was Jane Kennedy, who drowned in the Forth ferry accident in 1589. He married secondly Elizabeth Hamilton. James VI gave a ring to his wife at the christening of their eldest child in 1594.

His children with Elizabeth Hamilton included:

- Janet Melville (born 1600)
- Andrew Melville (born 1603)
- John Melville (born 1604).
- Anna Melville, who married Sir James Murray of Tippermuir in January 1624. He is known as the compiler of a miscellany of verse.
- George Melville, who married the widow of the king's servant David Drummond.
- Elizabeth Melville
- Helen Melvelle
