= Timothy Cagnioli =

Italian merchant and banker

Timothy Cagnioli (floruit 1540–1590) was an Italian merchant and banker in Scotland. Cagnioli was active in Edinburgh during the Regency of Mary of Guise and the personal reign of Mary, Queen of Scots. As a merchant he supplied luxury fabrics used in costume and interior decoration. He was able to lend large sums of money and issue letters of credit needed by travellers abroad.

== Career in Scotland ==
He wrote to Mary of Guise from Edinburgh in July 1552, sending three pounds weight of crimson silk, gold and silver thread, and 24 ells of golden gauze. He had ordered more gold and silver gauze to be made in Paris. An account of textiles provided in 1553 includes black velvet, black satin, black damask, taffeta, silk chamlet, and more silver gauze, and crimson, gold, and silver thread. The fabrics were delivered to her at Stirling Castle and recorded in her wardrobe book.

Around this time, the French ambassador in London, Antoine de Noailles, mentioned that "Thymothée Camodey" an associate of Mary of Guise's diplomat Henri Cleutin, kept an account of the expenses of French soldiers garrisoned in Scotland. Cagnioli lent money to Cleutin, but seems to let him down in 1555. Cleutin had to find Scottish lenders.

A tax roll or stent of 1556 includes him a resident of the south-west quarter of Edinburgh. The burgh council of Edinburgh allowed him to sell whole "sticks" or lengths of silks which he had imported in September 1557, as a wholesaler, but not cut and sell fabrics to customers as free merchants or burgesses of the town could.

In February 1558 he provided finance for Mary's half-brother, James Stewart, Commendator of St Andrews, to travel to Paris to complete the marriage contract of Mary and the Dauphin. Cagnioli gave letters of credit worth £6,687 Scots. His mother, Margaret Erskine, Lady of Lochleven, made a bond for repayment with the Clerk Register, James MacGill, and two Edinburgh merchants, James Adamson (burgh treasurer) and James Barroun. At the same time Cagnioli advanced the Earl of Cassilis £6,720. Cassilis died in France and Cagnioli was still not repaid in 1586.

His cook, Ninian McCrechan, was censured by the town council for slandering the kirk minister John Knox on 8 April 1562. He said in public on the High Street of Edinburgh that the Earls of Bothwell and Arran were agreed, and so Knox's time was run. He was whipped in the tolbooth and put in the branks. Another offence would result in his banishment.

Cagnioli received £500 Scots from the queen's income known as the "Thirds of Benefices" in 1562. This was repayment for money advanced to decorate a cabinet room for Mary, Queen of Scots in Holyrood Palace. The queen's valet Servais de Condé had lined the cabinet room with 26 ells of a fabric called "Paris Green". The English diplomat Thomas Randolph mentions this cabinet as a space to which he was not admitted, where the queen withdrew to write letters and to weep.

On 17 February 1565, at Wemyss Castle, Mary made Cagnioli her "argentar", in charge of her personal expenses. She met Lord Darnley for the first time on the same day. On 23 February he was made a burgess of Edinburgh, and had customs exemptions granted by Mary. He was allowed to be a burgess because his wife Jonet Curle was from Edinburgh. In October 1565 he was involved in a contract for mining lead ore at Leadhills granted by Mary and Lord Darnley.

Joseph Riccio, a brother of Mary's servant David Rizzio ran away from Edinburgh towards England in January 1566, taking money belonging to courtiers including Cagnioli.

James Stewart, now Regent Moray, granted him a pension of £100 yearly on 17 May 1569. His wife, Jonet Curle, was a sister of Mary's secretary Gilbert Curle. Jonet Curle later pledged a pair of gold and pearl "garnishings" to Janet Fockart for a loan, these were probably worn with a French hood, and may have been a wedding gift.

In June 1574 he had a legal dispute with Marie Pieris, Lady Seton. He stood as "cautioner" for customs owed by a Dutch merchant Symon Lastrik, and eventually had to pay. In August 1586, he wrote to his brother-in-law Gilbert Curle about repayment of a loan.
