= Richard Fletcher (bishop) =

16th-century English Anglican bishop

The Right Reverend Richard Fletcher
- Bishop of London
- Church: Church of England
- Province: Canterbury
- Diocese: London
- Elected: 30 December 1594
- In office: 10 January 1595 – 15 June 1596
- Predecessor: John Aylmer
- Successor: Richard Bancroft
- Previous posts: Bishop of Worcester; Bishop of Bristol; Dean of Peterborough

Orders
- Consecration: 14 December 1589

Personal details
- Born: c. 1544/5 Watford
- Died: 15 June 1596 (aged approximately 51–52)
- Denomination: Anglican
- Children: John Fletcher

Richard Fletcher (1544/5, Watford – 15 June 1596) was a Church of England priest and bishop. He was successively Dean of Peterborough (1583–89), bishop of Bristol (1589–93), Bishop of Worcester (1593–95) and Bishop of London (1595–96).

Fletcher was educated at Norwich School and at Trinity College, Cambridge, matriculating in 1562, graduating B.A. 1566. Moving to Corpus Christi College, where he gained a fellowship in 1569, he graduated M.A. 1569, B.D. 1576, D.D. 1580. He was the father of playwright John Fletcher.

During Fletcher's time as Dean of Peterborough Cathedral he was present at the execution of Mary, Queen of Scots on 8 February 1587, described by Fraser as "pray(ing) out loud and at length, in a prolonged and rhetorical style as though determined to force his way into the pages of history" (1969:584), and presided over her initial funeral and burial at Peterborough Cathedral.

Fletcher was elected Bishop of Bristol on 13 November 1589 and consecrated on 14 December 1589. He was translated to the bishopric of Worcester on 10 February 1593, and to the bishopric of London on 10 January 1595.

Fletcher died in office on 15 June 1596.

== Sources ==
- Harries, R.; Cattermole, P.; Mackintosh, P. (1991). A History of Norwich School: King Edward VI's Grammar School at Norwich. Norwich: Friends of Norwich School. ISBN 978-0-9518561-1-6.
- Horn, J. M. Fasti Ecclesiae Anglicanae 1541–1857. Institute of Historical Research.

Church of England titles
Preceded by William Latymer	Dean of Peterborough; 1583–1589	Succeeded by Thomas Nevile
Preceded by John Bullingham	Bishop of Bristol; 1589–1593	Vacant Title next held by John Thornborough
Preceded by Edmund Freke	Bishop of Worcester; 1593–1595	Succeeded by Thomas Bilson
Preceded by John Aylmer	Bishop of London; 1595–1596	Succeeded by Richard Bancroft
