= William Wickham (bishop) =

Bishop of Winchester

William Wickham (Wykeham) (1539 – 11 June 1595) was an English bishop.

== Life ==
He was educated at Eton College and King's College, Cambridge, where he was a Fellow in 1559, and M.A. 1564. He was a fellow of Eton in 1568, and vice-provost there around c. 1570. He was a royal chaplain, before 1574, and owed his career largely to the influence of Lord Burghley.

After holding successive canonries at Westminster Abbey (1570–1571) and St George's Chapel, Windsor (1571–1584), he became Bishop of Lincoln in 1584, and preached at the funeral of Mary, Queen of Scots, on 2 August 1587 in Peterborough. His prayer for her led him to be attacked by Martin Marprelate.

He became Bishop of Winchester in 1595. He died in Southwark at Winchester Palace, and was buried at St Mary Overies. William Wickham, Member of Parliament for Petersfield was his descendant.

== Notes ==
Church of England titles
Preceded by Thomas Cooper	Bishop of Lincoln; 1584–1595	Succeeded by William Chaderton
Preceded by Thomas Cooper	Bishop of Winchester; 1595–1595	Succeeded by William Day
