= Marie Pieris =

French lady in waiting

Marie Pieris, Lady Seton (c. 1520–1576) was a French lady in waiting at the Scottish court.

She was the daughter of René Pierres, Seigneur du Plessis-Baudouin and Antoinette d'Hommes. The French Pierres family claimed to have descended from the Percy family of Northumberland.

== Scotland ==
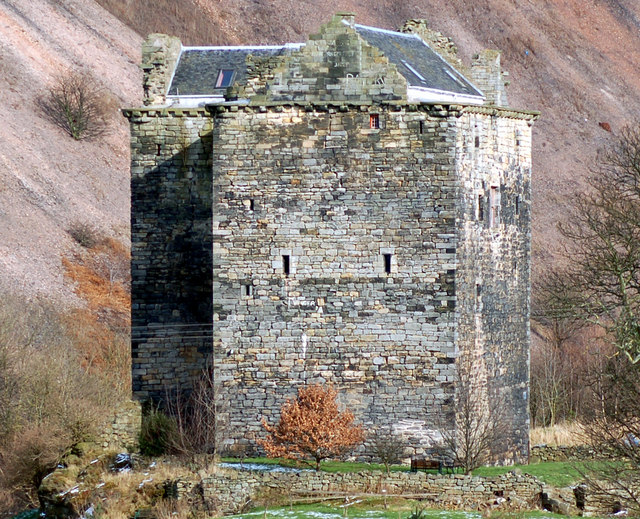
Niddry Castle was one of Marie Pieris' homes

Marie Pieris joined the household of Mary of Guise when she married James V, King of Scotland. Soon after coming to Scotland, she married George Seton, 6th Lord Seton. Their handfasting was held at Falkland Palace in February 1539. Her father wrote from Plessis-Baudouin to Mary of Guise to thank her for arranging the marriage, and he promised that after his death Marie would have her inheritance from him. René Pierres was improving his home at this time with a new drawbridge and a chapel at the parish church of Joué-Étiau in Maine-et-Loire.

In early modern Scotland married women did not change their surnames. Her children included Robert Seton of Greendikes, James, and Mary Seton, the well-known companion of Mary, Queen of Scots. Little is known of Robert and less of John.

Her colleague in the queen's household, Jeanne Delareynveil, married Robert Beaton of Creich in 1539, and their daughter Mary Beaton was another of the celebrated four Marys.

== War with England ==
After the death of James V, Scotland was ruled by James Hamilton, 2nd Earl of Arran as "Regent Arran". The infant queen remained in the care of her mother, Mary of Guise, at Linlithgow Palace and then at Stirling Castle. A proposal from Henry VIII that the infant queen Mary should marry his son Prince Edward, led to a war, now often known as the Rough Wooing.

Marie Pieris wrote to Mary of Guise from Niddry Castle, warning her that Lord Seton had heard of a plot by Regent Arran to kidnap the infant Mary, Queen of Scots. As she mentions that she has discussed the plot with Cardinal Beaton, the letter may date from 1543, when the Cardinal was held in Lord Seton's custody. She signed the letter "Marye Pyerres".

The couple were given a new charter of the lands of Winchburgh and "West" Niddry Castle on 27 June 1548. During the siege of Haddington the family lived at Culross in Fife. Lord Seton died in July 1549 and was buried in the quire of Culross Abbey. When the war was over, Marie Pieris had his body reburied at Seton Collegiate Church next to his father.

The Seton family and the Hamiltons were reconciled by August 1550 when her step-son George Seton, 7th Lord Seton married Isobel Hamilton, daughter of Sir William Hamilton of Sanquhar, who was Captain of Edinburgh Castle for his kinsman Regent Arran. The wedding was celebrated on 12 August with a feast at Edinburgh Castle. William Hamilton is said to have organised repairs to Seton Palace which had been damaged by the English army following the sack and burning of Edinburgh in May 1544.

== Second marriage ==
In 1554 Lady Seton married Philippe Pierre de Cluys, Seigneur de Briantes (d. 1558), whose name is usually given as "Pierre de Clovis" or "Cluise". A drawing of his portrait from the studio of François Clouet is in the collection of Musée Condé at Château de Chantilly.

Cluys attended Mary of Guise during her visit to England in 1551. In 1554, he came to Scotland bringing a letter from the accountant Jehan Bougouin about Mary Queen of Scots' French household. He was a nephew of Jacques de la Brosse a former French diplomat in Scotland and soldier at the Siege of Leith. They had no children. Marie Pieris was occasionally known as "Madame Briant", but also used her title "Lady Seton".

== Mary, Queen of Scots: in Scotland and England ==
With Jeanne Delareynveil and Marie Courcelles she joined the household of the widowed Mary Queen of Scots when she returned to Scotland in 1561. Mary gave "Ladie Seitoun" white and red silk taffeta in November 1561, possibly for a gown. Marie seems to have done sewing for the queen, and in January 1564 was given Holland linen to line sleeves for the queen or her ladies.

A grant from Mary, Queen of Scots to Lady Seton in 1565 was addressed to "Dame Marie Pier, Lady Seytoun and Brieane." Payments to "dame Marie Pierre, Lady Seyttoun" occur in the accounts of Mary, Queen of Scots. Mary gave "Madame Briant" a hat in March 1565. Before the wedding of Mary and Darnley, "old Lady Seton" and David Rizzio were with the couple when they walked in disguise or masque costume on Edinburgh's High Street.

When Mary was pregnant, in May 1566 she made a will bequeathing her jewels, and if she had died "Madame de Briante" would have a pair of bracelets studded with amethysts. At Easter 1567, with the rest of the household, she was given linen and was listed as "Madame de Briande". The occasion was a Maundy Thursday, or "Skyris Thuriday", ceremony when the queen washed her ladies' feet.

The day after the death of Lord Darnley at the Kirk o' Field, the servant known as "French Paris" came to queen's bedchamber at Holyrood Palace to hang her bed with mourning black and light candles in the "ruelle", a space between the bed and the wall. "Madame de Bryant" gave him a fried egg for his breakfast. He noticed her speaking privately with the Earl of Bothwell concealed behind a curtain.

Mary, Queen of Scots was deposed in 1567 and was taken to Lochleven Castle. She escaped and first made her way to safety at Niddry. In 1568 she went to England and Marie's daughter Mary Seton joined her. In August 1570 Mary Pieris was at Blair Castle with the Countess of Atholl and heard her daughter was ill in England. She wrote from Dunkeld to Queen Mary to ask if she could come home. The messenger carrying the letters, John Moon, was captured. On 29 August "dame Marie Pier" and her son Robert were arrested for passing letters to Moon for Mary, Queen of Scots. They were put on trial in Tolbooth at Edinburgh, on the charge that their letters denied the authority of James VI of Scotland and his representatives. They were released on their promise they would not write to Queen Mary again. The Bishop of Ross, John Lesley, had written to Regent Lennox that she was Mary's special servant and one of her Dames of Honour and should be freed. In October, Queen Elizabeth heard she had been arrested and would be banished from Scotland, and took action that Regent Lennox should know that she thought it no great cause. Marie Pieris had already been released before this intervention, promising not to write to Queen Mary again.

As the Marian Civil War continued, Marie Pieris stayed in Edinburgh Castle during the "lang siege" and helped Mary Fleming make an inventory of jewels of Mary, Queen of Scots remaining in the castle. She signed the document "Marye Ladye Seton". The jewels were subsequently pledged by William Kirkcaldy of Grange for loans from the queen's supporters to pay his soldiers.

In June 1574 she had a lawsuit against the Italian cloth merchant and financier Timothy Cagnioli. Mary, Queen of Scots wrote that "Madame de Briante" had returned to France in November 1574 to discuss her marital property with her brother-in-law. Mary wrote that she served her and her mother Mary of Guise, and her daughter Mary Seton continued in agreeable daily service at Sheffield Castle. Mary recommended her again, "la bonne dame de Seyton", to the Archbishop of Glasgow in a letter of 20 February 1575.
