= Gilbert Curle =

Scottish secretary

- Born: Edinburgh, Kingdom of Scotland
- Died: 3 September 1609; Possibly Madrid, Spain
- Other name: Curll
- Occupations: Secretary, diplomat, cryptographer, courtier
- Employer: Mary, Queen of Scots
- Known for: Secretary to Mary, Queen of Scots; involvement in the Babington Plot correspondence; use of ciphered communications

Gilbert Curle or Curll (died 1609) was a Scottish secretary who served Mary, Queen of Scots during her captivity in England. He married Barbara Mowbray, one of three sisters serving Mary.

== England ==
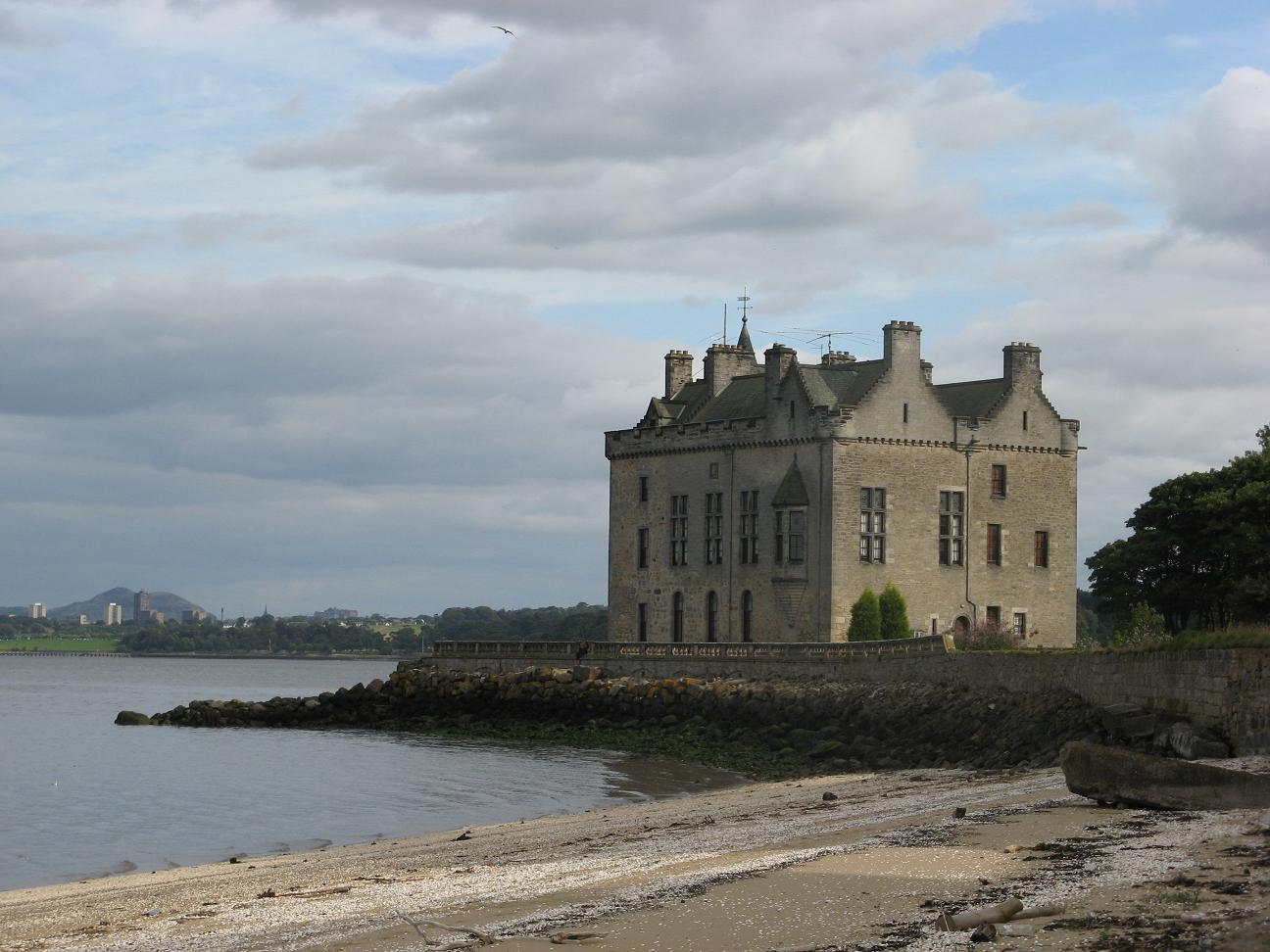
Gilbert Curle married Barbara Mowbray, a daughter of the Laird of Barnbougle

Little is known of Curle's family background, but he seems to have been from an Edinburgh family. His sister Jonet Curle was married to Timothy Cagnioli an Italian banker in Edinburgh, and their father James Curle was a textile merchant in Edinburgh who supplied the household of Regent Arran.

According to the confession of Nicolas Hubert alias French Paris, Mary wanted Curle in her service to replace Alexander Durham in 1567 shortly before the murder of Lord Darnley. Mary distrusted Durham. Curle was listed as a valet of the chamber in Mary's household in 1567.

Gilbert Curle was with Mary, Queen of Scots in England in September 1568, acting as her secretary for the Scots language and six months later was made a valet of her chamber. Some letters for Mary were given to his brother James Curle in Edinburgh. He brought letters in 1577, as noted by John Constable and Gilbert Talbot, who wrote that Curle's brother and another Scot came selling linen to the household. By the 1580s Mary's correspondents often added postscripts to their letters addressed to Curle.

In December 1581 Mary asked for six horses for riders to attend her. She was allowed four horses for her men to accompany her coach, and they were not allowed to carry pistols, called "daggs". The appointed riders were Andrew Melville, Claude Nau, Gilbert Curle, and Bastian Pagez.

One of his sisters, Elizabeth Curle, joined him in the queen's household.

== Marriage at Tutbury Castle ==
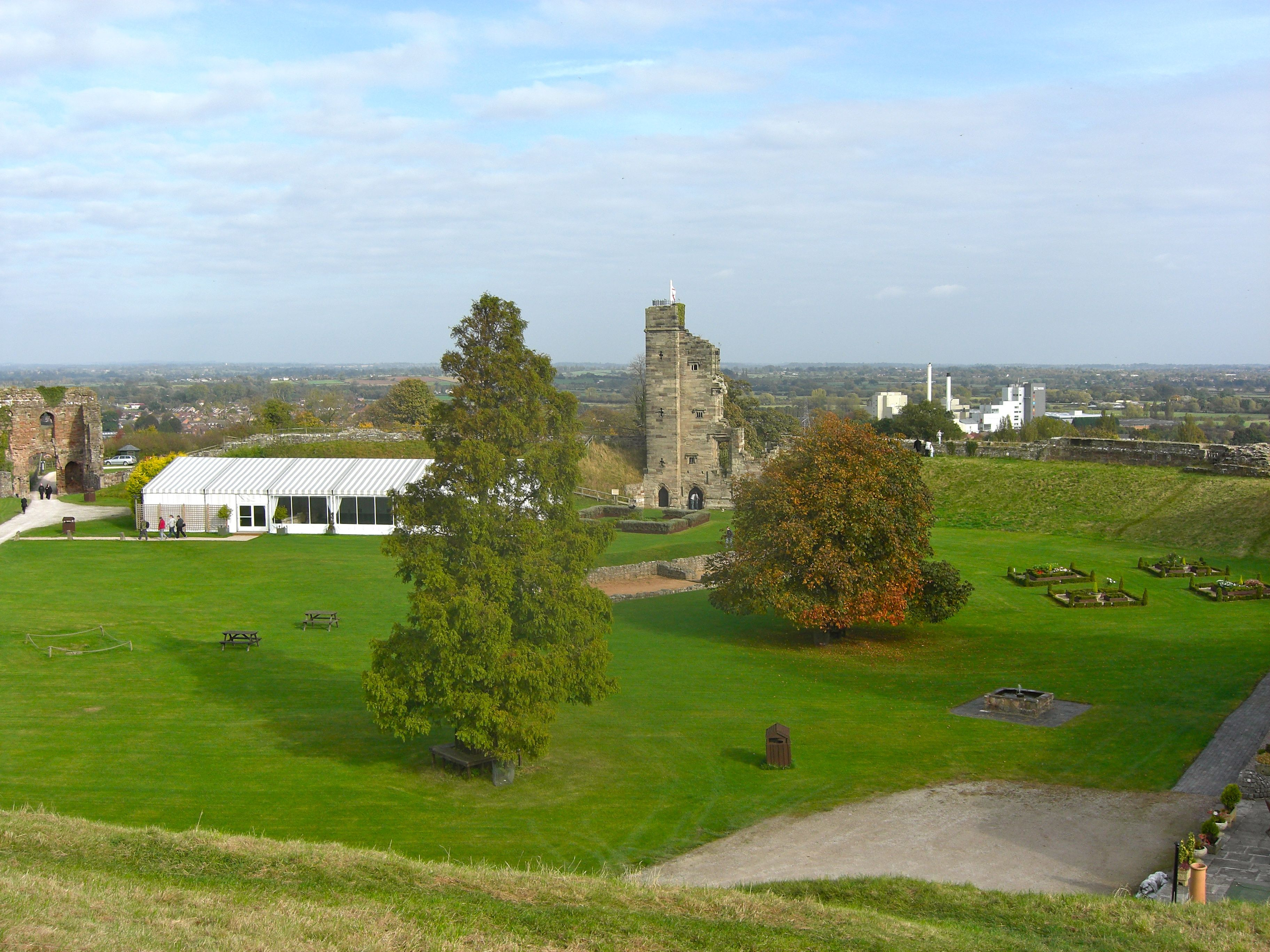
Gilbert Curle married Barbara Mowbray at Tutbury Castle

Curle married Barbara Mowbray, one of Mary's gentlewomen. She was a daughter of John Mowbray, Laird of Barnbougle in West Lothian, near Cramond Island, and Elizabeth Kirkcaldy, a sister of William Kirkcaldy of Grange. Grange had been a commander in the Marian Civil War and was executed in July 1573.

John Mowbray was in touch with Francis Walsingham in December 1580, after one his sons, Francis, met him in London. The French ambassador, Michel de Castelnau, was informed that Francis Mowbray wished to serve Elizabeth I.

Coded letters to the French ambassador Castelnau mentioning the arrival of Barbara Mowbray or one of her sisters in Mary's household were discovered in the Bibliothèque nationale de France and deciphered in 2023. Curle, Nau, and Jérôme Pasquier ciphered letters for Mary.

As well as using substitution ciphers, Curle also wrote letters disguising the content as an ordinary merchant's letter. In 1584, a letter from William Wilbeck to his cousin Thomas was really a secret message to Thomas Baldwin. In the letter, Elizabeth I was called the merchant's wife and so on. The letter was intercepted and a key or nomenclator was made.

=== Betrothal ===
The marriage was discussed in October 1584 at Wingfield, and Ralph Sadler notified Francis Walsingham that the couple had written to the Laird of Barnbougle for permission to marry, and Mary had asked him to speed the letter.

Meanwhile, Curle was taken from Wingfield to view Tutbury Castle and examine the accommodation in advance of Mary moving there. He reported the lodgings were in a poor state. Sadler wrote to Walsingham that Curle's report was misleading, and he had lied "like a false Scot". Sadler and his assistant John Somers admitted that Curle had justly noted that the glazing was in disrepair in the great tower, but they suspected Mary's household were reluctant to move for "secret causes".

A great deal of furnishings were needed for Tutbury. John Somers was "every day assaulted" by Nau and Curle with daily requests for horses for Mary. He said the weather was too cold for riding and she could always borrow horses. Somer thought that Mary intended to send Curle as a messenger to Scotland, and he provided a sketch of the secretary's character for William Cecil. Curle was not so quick-witted or prompt as Nau, French-like, but with a shrewd melancholy wit, and not so pleasant in speech and utterance, and suspect enough. Mary liked him for his fidelity and secrecy. If Curll went to Scotland, he would "go lightlier in post" and not make such an expensive show of his status as Nau would.

=== Merchant's letter ===
Curle corresponded with Thomas Baldwin, a servant of the Earl of Shrewsbury. In order to disguise the meaning of his letters, Curle wrote about a "merchant of London" to mean Elizabeth I, Mary was a "merchant of Newcastle", and Francis Walsingham was the "merchant's wife". Mary's keeper Ralph Sadler was "the carrier" and his assistant John Somers "the carrier's man", and the Earl of Shrewsbury was "the peddler". Curle could then write letters that might pass as unsuspicious mercantile correspondence. Sadler inspected an intercepted letter in October 1584 and thought the identifications were not entirely correct. his colleague Somers seemed to be implicated in Curle's schemes, and Curle claimed the "carrier" and "carrier's man" disliked Bess of Hardwick. Sadler reported to Walsingham that he and Somers were angry with Curle for letting them down or betraying them, and Somers had not been turned or compromised. Somers wrote to Walsingham, as a conceit taking on the persona of the "carrier's man". Baldwin was sent to the Tower of London.

=== October wedding ===
Curle and Mowbray's wedding was held at Tutbury Castle on 23 or 24 October 1585. Mary had previously promised the couple a gift of 2000 French crowns, and they transferred the sum to Mary's French secretary and treasurer, Claude Nau. This transaction was witnessed by Andrew Melville, the Master of the Household, and Sebastian Megalli, the queen's almoner. Mary later made a will at Sheffield Manor in 1577, mentioning the sum of 4,000 Francs promised to the couple.

Amias Paulet, Mary's keeper at Tutbury, knew the couple were betrothed, but wrote to Walsingham after the wedding, saying that Mary had not told him of the ceremony in advance.

=== Gillis Mowbray comes to Tutbury ===
Barbara's sister Geillis or Gillis Mowbray came to England from Barnbougle too late for her sister's wedding. Mary wrote to Francis Walsingham for her passport from London on 30 September 1585. Geillis was sent from London to Derby, and arrived at Tutbury on 9 November. Her position at first was maid to Curle's sister Elizabeth. Geillis was an ancestor of the Clerk of Penicuik family, and it is thought that Mary gave her jewels, known today as the "Penicuik jewels" and displayed at the National Museum of Scotland.

In February 1586, Mary had discussions with a French visitor, Monsieur Arnault, at Chartley in the presence of Amias Powlet. She said that Geillis Mowbray had told her that James VI had sent a rich jewel to a Danish princess, a token of marriage negotiations. Geillis had heard the story when the Danish ambassadors were in Scotland before she left for London.

=== Arrested ===
Barbara Curle was pregnant in May 1586. They had eight children in total. Curle was arrested before their daughter was born in August 1586. Mary wanted her christened with her name, but there was no priest, so, after her return from Tixall, she made a form of baptism herself.

== Arrest and exile ==
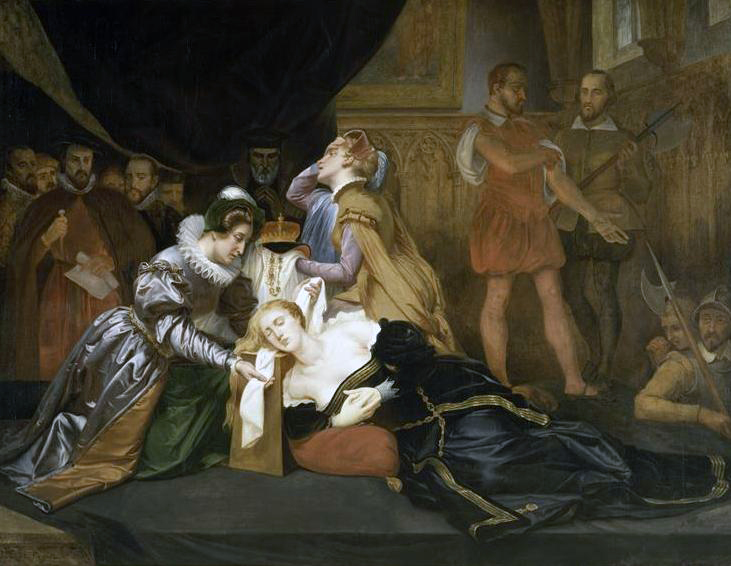
Jane Kennedy blindfolds Mary, Queen of Scots beside Elizabeth Curle, 19th-century painting by Abel de Pujol, (Valenciennes, musée des Beaux-Arts)

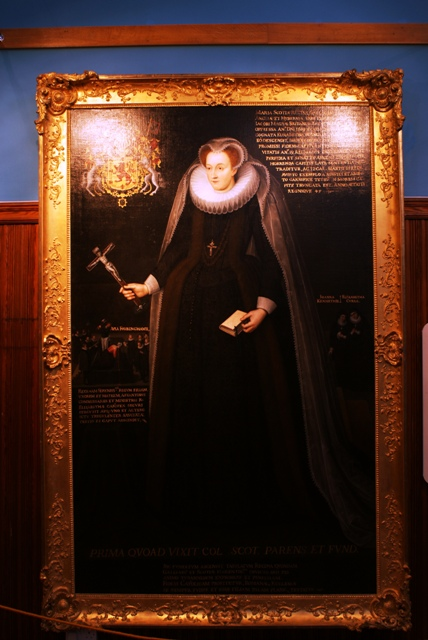
The Blairs Memorial portrait of Mary, Queen of Scots belonged to Hippolytus Curle.

Curle and Claude Nau were arrested, brought to London, and interrogated on 4 August 1586, suspected of involvement in the Babington Plot. Elizabeth I considered that neither Nau or Curle were so desperate that they might kill themselves.

Francis Walsingham asked Mary's keeper Amias Paulet to move her from Chartley Castle and detain the two secretaries. Thomas Gorges was sent to Chartley. Mary was taken to Tixall after setting out on hunting trip. During her protestations to Amias Paulet she lay in Elizabeth Curle's lap. Barbara Curle had her baby while she was away.

Evidence against Mary and her secretaries had been gathered by the code-breaker Thomas Phelippes. Phellipes had written to Walsingham in July that he hoped Nau and Curle would be hanged. Evidence from their work was used at Mary's trial. They were also questioned in order to demonstrate that Mary was the author of letters which they had written from her dictation, translated, and transcribed into cipher. Curle testified that he warned Mary not to respond to Babington's letters.

On 2 September 1586, Curle noted on a copy of a letter to Charles Paget that Mary had first given him a draft in French, which he translated into English. William Cecil added a further note, that this was Curle's "superscription". Charles Paget was involved in the Babington plot.

During his detention, his mother-in-law Elizabeth Kirkcaldy wrote from Barnbougle to the Scottish ambassador in London, Archibald Douglas, asking for his help. His sister Janet Curle wrote to him, hoping that Queen Elizabeth would release him. At this difficult time, Curle also received a demand for payment from Mary's Italian banker Timothy Cagnioli. Cagnioli was married to Jonet Curle, probably Gilbert's sister. In May 1594 there was a rumour that the rebel Francis Stewart, 5th Earl of Bothwell had been secretly lodged in Janet Curle's house on the Castle Hill in Edinburgh.

Walsingham sent news to the Scottish Court in September 1586 that Mary was to be moved to Fotheringhay, and that "the matters whereof she is guilty are already so plain and manifest (being also confessed by her two secretaries), as it is thought, they shall required no long debating".

When Mary's household moved to Fotheringhay, Gilbert Curle's wife Barbara, his sister Elizabeth, and sister-in-law Geillis Mowbray, and his servant Lawrence, a Scotsman, remained at Chartley. At Fotheringhay, Jane Kennedy and Elizabeth Curle helped Mary onto the scaffold and Kennedy tied her blindfold. Jane and Elizabeth had been chosen for this duty by Mary herself. Later, Kennedy told the Spanish ambassador Bernardino de Mendoza that she had blindfolded Mary at the execution, rather than Elizabeth Curle, because she had precedence of noble birth.

Curle's wife, Barbara Moubray, spoke to a friend or agent of the cryptographer Thomas Phelippes on 22 February 1587. She thought that Phelippes was to blame for her husband's troubles and imprisonment, and she thought that James VI would take revenge for Mary's death. Phelippes' agent, who was travelling to Scotland, dismissed her speeches as "womanish presumptions". He was going to talk to father, the Laird of Barnbougle.

After his release, Gilbert Curle went to France and then settled in the Spanish Netherlands. A note made around 1589 indicates that Geillis Moubray, who had returned to Scotland, her husband Sir James Lyndsey, and her sister Jean Mowbray received pensions from Spain paid in gold ducats.

== Death and commemoration ==
Gilbert Curle died on 3 September 1609, possibly in Madrid. Barbara died in Antwerp on 31 July 1616, and her sister-in-law Elizabeth Curle died on 29 May 1620.

Barbara Mowbray's son Hippolytus Curle and Elizabeth Curle had a monument made in the church of St Andrew Antwerp which includes a portrait of Queen Mary. The monument was made by Robert and Jan De Nole and the portrait was painted on copper by Frans Pourbus the Younger (1569-1622).

Hippolytus Curle gave an encaustic or enamelled "Agnus Dei", depicting St Ignatius of Loyala on one side, to the Scots College at Douai, now lost, with the memorial portrait of Mary which is kept by Blairs College Museum in Aberdeen. The crucifix depicted in the portrait may be similar one worn by Mary, with which Elizabeth Curle was familiar.

== Elizabeth Curle and the jewels of Mary, Queen of Scots ==
An inventory taken of the queen's goods at Chartley in August 1586 mentions that Elizabeth Curle was in charge of several lengths of silk, linen and other suchlike items, not included in the inventory, and many various everyday objects of little value.

After the execution of Mary, Queen of Scots in 1587 an inventory was made of her jewels. Several pieces were listed as in the custody of Gilbert's sister Elizabeth, including; a chain of coral and gold musk or pomander beads set with pearls; a chain of small pearls; a chain of amber with small pearls and other beads; a gold "book" enamelled, with the portraits of Mary, Darnley, and James VI; a gold ring set with a ruby; a diamond ring; a ring of mother of pearl set with a blue sapphire; a gold enamelled spear; a gold tree with a queen on top and a boy pulling the branches; a silver looking glass; 12 biliards and an ivory ball.

A miniature portrait of Mary in a later setting held by the Blairs Museum is thought to have belonged to Elizabeth Curle. She mentioned a miniature set in gold in her will, a gift from the queen on the "morning she was martyred". The surviving miniature portrait resembles a portrait of Queen Mary revealed by x-ray imaging beneath a depiction of John Maitland of Thirlestance by Adrian Vanson.

Mary had asked Elizabeth to give Barbara Curle a gold ensign depicting one of Aesop's fables and two rings, one with a diamond. She was to give Curle's youngest child two rings, one set with five little opals, and a small chain of coral and mother of pearl.

Elizabeth Curle had custody of Mary's chamber plate, including two little silver flagons, two mazer cups mounted with silver gilt, and a little silver bell. She also had two more looking glasses, two large watches, and a smaller watch. She had 200 French crowns for one of her sisters, and 100 crowns for Gilbert Curle's servant Lawrence.

She also had several items from the queen's wardrobe, including a silk camlet gown, a black petticoat edged with sheepskin, a russet satin doublet, and a beaver felt hat. She was keeping for Barbara Curle the queen's cloak of figured velvet lined with shag, and a white satin doublet, and for Curle's child, a satin kirtle, and another white satin kirtle.

Mary made a plan that Philip II of Spain should have her rights to inherit the English throne after Elizabeth I, if James VI was not by then a Catholic. Elizabeth Curle and Mary's apothecary Pierre Gorion were said to have carried her instructions to the Spanish ambassador in Paris, Bernardino de Mendoza.
