= Mademoiselle Rallay =

Scottish courtier (1561–1585)

- Born: c. 1505
- Died: 1585
- Relatives: Renée de Rallay (niece)

Mademoiselle Rallay or Madame Raylie (fl. 1561 – d. 1585) was a Scottish courtier. She served as chamberwoman and then lady-in-waiting to Mary, Queen of Scots. She was described as one of Mary's favorites. Her niece Renée de Rallay, also known as Beauregard, also served Mary, Queen of Scots.

== Life ==
=== Secretary Raulet ===
Mary first mentioned her wise and honest servant the "damoyselle" called "Rallay" in a letter to her mother Mary of Guise around the year 1557. In May 1574, Mary wrote that Rallay had served her and accompanied her in her chamber when she was a girl in France. The title "Mademoiselle" could in this time period be used for both married and unmarried women, since the title "Madame" was an honorary title. Rallay was married to the queen's private secretary Augustine or Pierre Raulet, Raullet or Roullet.

He had worked for Mary of Guise, and in March 1558 organised payments to French merchants for clothing fabrics. In December 1564, the English diplomat Thomas Randolph wrote that Raulet had been displaced from some of his duties by David Rizzio. It was said that Randolph and Raulet had been familiar together, sharing confidences.

Raullet administered Mary's dowry and jointure estates in France, and was intended to come to England to report on her finances in 1569. The English ambassador in France, Henry Norris, wrote that Secretary Raulet was a "crafty fellow". He was with Queen Mary at Sheffield Castle in 1571, described as her secretary for the French language. He died on 30 August 1574 at Sheffield after three month's illness. The Earl of Shrewsbury searched his papers and Mary took charge of his legacy of 280 French crowns. Claude Nau replaced him as Mary's secretary for the French language.

=== Scotland ===
She was one of the French courtiers who accompanied Mary, Queen of Scots from France to Scotland in 1561. She was originally a chamberwoman, but was promoted to lady-in-waiting. Rallay was described as one of the queen's favored confidants.

One of her first tasks in Scotland in September 1561 was to make an inventory, with the wardrobe servant Servais de Condé, of the goods and furnishings that had belonged to the queen's mother Mary of Guise. She appears in the 1562 menu of the household, eating at a table with the maidens of honour.

In December 1561 Mary either gave her, or asked her to repair, a zibellini, a fur of ermine and marten to wear around her neck, with a gold head and feet, enamelled and set with precious stones and pearls, which had belonged to Mary of Guise. Rallay made night caps or "coifs" for the queen from Holland linen. In one version of the incident she was called the "Mistress of the Maids", suggesting her role was like the Mother of the Maids at the English court, supervising younger women.

John Knox mentioned she was 'mistress to the Queen's "dountibours"', in charge of the younger maids, "dountibour" being a Scottish term of abuse for women of the court. According to Knox, when the Catholic mass was interrupted at Holyrood Palace by Protestant townspeople in August 1563, she fetched the comptroller John Wishart of Pitarrow from St Giles' Kirk to help.

Her name appears frequently in the accounts of fabric kept by Servais de Condé, for her bedding and for items she made for the queen. In January 1562, she lined marten and ermine fur for the queen to wear about her neck with red frieze cloth. She was given fabric to make pouches and holders to keep the queen's rings and jewelled girdles when they went on progress. Mary gave her an old black damask gown with wide sleeves bordered with velvet that had belonged to Mary of Guise. She was given "yellow crimson violet satin" in July 1562 and white sewing silk for a project in January 1563. In December 1563 she was given canvas for wigs or hair dressings for the queen called "perruques", possibly for masque costume.

Rallay appears to have returned to France in 1567.

=== England ===
After Queen Mary had been imprisoned in England, Rallay returned to her service. She brought her niece Renée Rallay, also known as Beauregard (the name of the family estate in France), who was also employed in Mary's household in England. They were at the French court and Mary's ally in France, the Archbishop of Glasgow requested a passport for them in December 1573. The passports had not been granted in May 1574. Mary sent a gift of needlework to Elizabeth, and suggested that if Rallay was allowed to come she could make better novelties.

A coded letter from Mary to the French ambassador Michel de Castelnau mentioning Rallay's niece, who had been at Reims with Renée of Guise, was discovered in the Bibliothèque nationale de France and deciphered in 2023. Mary made a will at Sheffield Manor, bequeathing 100 Écu to "Beauregart", enough to see her home.

In July 1578, Mademoiselle de Rallay, said to over 70 years old, had been ill in bed at Sheffield Manor since Easter, troubled with a great catarrh. She wanted to retire and needed a passport to return to France. She could be replaced by the 13-year-old daughter of Janet Scott and Thomas Kerr, Laird of Ferniehirst. Queen Elizabeth would not permit this change in the household. Probably, it was suspected that the girl's presence would facilitate Mary's secret correspondence with her supporters in Scotland.

In 1585 woollen fabric bought in Coventry called "dornix" was used to make a canopy for Rallay at Tutbury Castle. She was said to be around 74 or 80 years old in February 1585, and sick. Mary was ill herself, but was carried to visit her servant in her chamber. Rallay died soon after, and Ralph Sadler delayed giving Mary letters from Queen Elizabeth because the loss of her old servant troubled her mind so. In a letter to the French ambassador Michel de Castelnau, Mary described Rallay as 'one of the principal consolations of my captivity'. She hoped a daughter of the Countess of Atholl could join her household, filling the place of Lady Seton and "ma bonne Rallay"; my good Rallay.

== Renée Rallay alias Beauregard ==
Her niece Renée, the younger Rallay, Beauregard, was one of four damoiselles remaining with Mary in 1586, the others being Jean Kennedy, Gillis Mowbray, and Elspeth or Elizabeth Curle. She was still with Mary when she was executed in 1587. She was noted as the keeper of some of the queen's jewels, including a diamond ring, a chain of pearls and amber, a jewel of crystal set in gold, and a bodkin set with a sapphire for hair dressing, with 100 French gold crowns, an unfinished bed, and the queen's set of embroidery silks.

A description of Mary's funeral in La Mort de la Royne D'Escosse states that the Scottish attendants who processed into the Peterborough Catedral were Barbara Mowbray, Christine Hog (the wife of Bastian Pagez), Gillis Mowbray, Elspeth Curle, Renée de Rallay, Marie Pagez (a daughter of Bastian), Jean Kennedy, and Susanne Kirkcaldy (a daughter of William Kirkcaldy of Grange).

Mademoiselle Rallay's will had been confiscated with other papers at Chartley Castle. In August 1587 Claude Nau, one of Mary's secretaries, made a note of money to be returned to the late Queen's servants, including a legacy of 626 French crowns that Mademoiselle de Rallay had left to the "young gentlewoman" her niece, "Renée de Rally, called de Beauregard". Renée was given a passport to return to France.
