= Cornelius Cure =

English-born sculptor of Dutch parentage

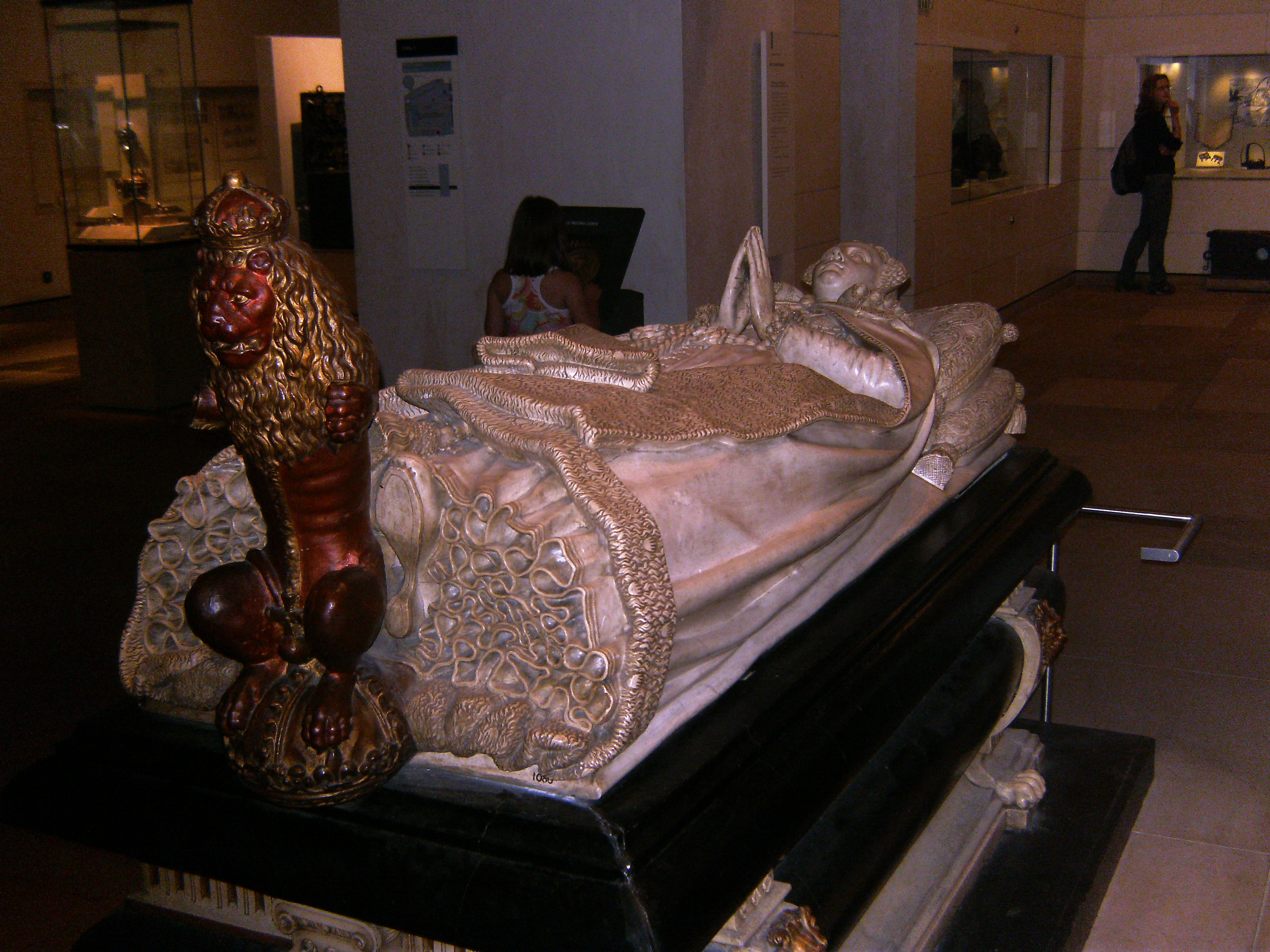
Tomb slab of Mary, Queen of Scots, copy of the effigy in Westminster Abbey, sculpted by Cornelius Cure and his son William, National Museum of Scotland, 1612

Cornelius Cure (died 1607) was an English-born sculptor of Dutch parentage, being the son of the sculptor, William Cure I.

His father made and installed a fountain for Nicholas Bacon at Redgrave Hall in September 1568.

Cure lived and worked in Southwark in Surrey (now London). William Cecil, Lord Burghley recommended his appointment to replace Edward Young as royal master mason to the courtier William Killigrew, praising his skill, honesty, and knowledge of work in foreign places. Cure was appointed Master Mason of the Tower of London and the Queen's other residences on 28 June 1596.

He held the office of Master Mason to both Queen Elizabeth I and King James I, originally jointly with his father. He was a popular sculptor of church monuments, such as those to Sirs Philip and Thomas Hoby, Thomas' widow, Elizabeth, Lady Russell, at Bisham in Berkshire, and Sir William Cordell at Long Melford in Suffolk.

In 1606, he was commissioned to produce the great monument to Mary, Queen of Scots, in Westminster Abbey. He was paid for supplying "touchstone and rauncestone", two kinds of alabaster. The monument remained incomplete at his death, but was finished by his son, William. The queen was interred in September 1612, under the Cures' sculpture, for which they received £825.
