= Jane Kennedy (courtier) =

Scottish courtier

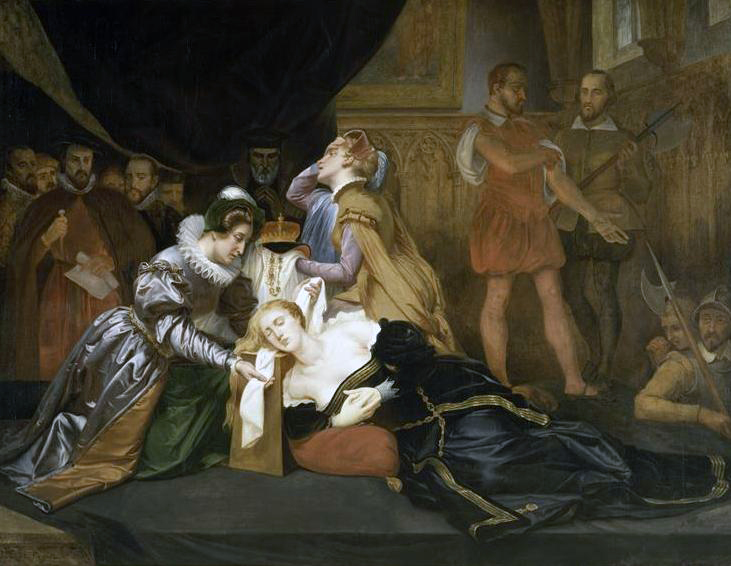
Jane Kennedy blindfolding Mary, Queen of Scots, 19th-century painting by Abel de Pujol, (Valenciennes, musée des Beaux-Arts)

Jane, Janet, or Jean Kennedy (died 1589) was a companion of Mary, Queen of Scots, during her captivity in England.

Jane was perhaps a daughter of Gilbert Kennedy, 3rd Earl of Cassilis, or more likely a relative.

== Servant of the captive queen ==
After the battle of Carberry Hill, Jane waited on Mary at Lochleven Castle where Mary was confined and signed abdication papers. Different accounts suggest that she either jumped from a wall while practicing for the Queen's escape, or leaped from a window to join the Queen as she fled the island, later helping row the boat to Kinross. Stories of Kennedy's role at Lochleven were publicized by Nicolas Caussin in La Cour Sainte (Paris, 1645), who included a detail that the queen's boat left without Jane Kennedy and she jumped into the loch from a castle window and swam after it.

In England, Jane was listed as a "maid" in Queen Mary's household at Tutbury Castle in October 1569, her name recorded by a French scribe as "Gin Cannate". At Sheffield Castle, in 1571, she was listed as a "maid of the chamber". The Earl of Shrewsbury wrote to William Cecil about a suspected servant called Martin, mentioning he seemed to be forming a relationship with "Jane Kenyte, the Scottish queen's woman". Shrewsbury made him swear on the Bible to have no further dealings with her. Mary made a will at Sheffield Manor, bequeathing 1000 Francs to "Jeanne Kenedy" in recompense for her service.

In 1586, at Chartley Manor, Jane, described a Gentlewoman of the Queen's chamber, was responsible for Mary's jewels. An inventory of the jewels and silver in Jane's keeping was made when Mary was taken to Tixall for a fortnight and her possessions searched. Jane was also in charge of linen and laundry. Subsequently, Kennedy was one of four damoiselles remaining with Queen Mary, the others being Renée Rallay alias Beauregard, Gillis Mowbray, and Elspeth or Elizabeth Curle.

At Fotheringhay Castle, Jane Kennedy and Elizabeth Curle helped Mary onto the scaffold. Mary intended to give Jane the gold cross from her neck but the executioner took it. Then Jane tied her blindfold. Jane and Elizabeth had been chosen for this duty by Mary herself.

The two ladies are featured and named in the Blairs Memorial Portrait of Mary Queen of Scots; Jane holds a white cloth. Another version of the picture is in the Royal Collection. One narrative of the execution describes the cloth as "a handkerchief of cambric all wrought over with gold needlework", another, as a "Corpus Christi cloth". A "Corpus Christi cloth" is used during the Catholic Mass to cover the consecrated host.

== After Mary ==
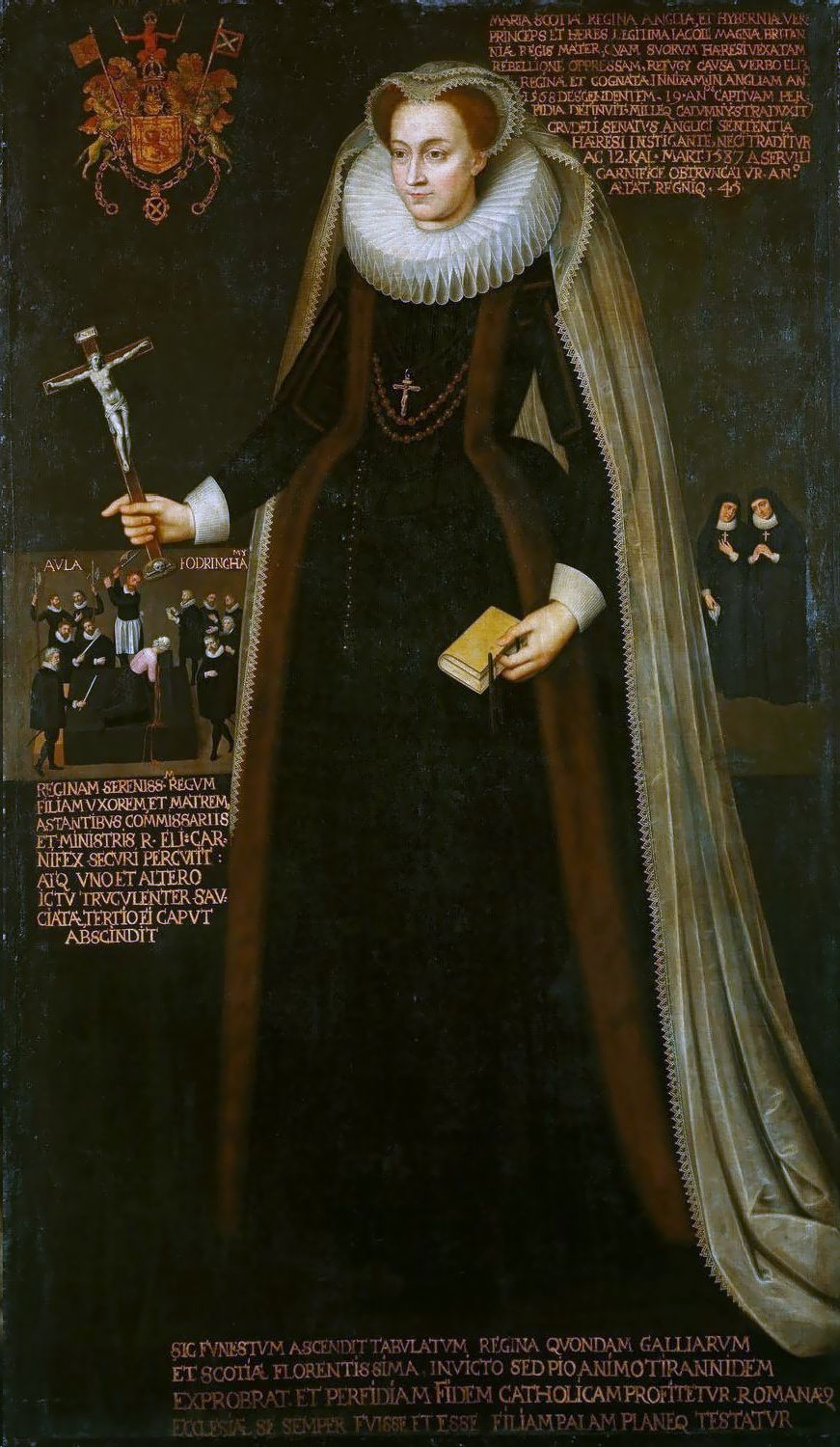
Memorial picture showing Jane Kennedy as a background figure to the right of Mary, (Royal Collection)

At the funeral of Queen Mary at Peterborough Cathedral on 1 August 1587, her ladies joined the procession in this order; Barbara Moubray, Christine Hog (the wife of Bastian Pagez), Renée du Raullay, Marie Pagez, Jane Kennedy, and Susannah Kirkcaldy.

Jane Kennedy collected two beds from Mary's belongings, one for the Duchess of Guise, the other for Madame de Châlons. She told the Spanish ambassador Bernardino de Mendoza that she had blindfolded Mary at the execution, as she had precedence of birth before Elizabeth Curle. Mendoza was considering if she should have a pension from Spain. He wrote that her ship was driven back to Portsmouth by a storm.

Jane Kennedy returned to Scotland from France in January 1588. She talked to James VI for two hours about Mary's last days and told his courtiers about the execution. King James was sad and pensive and had no supper that day.

She married Andrew Melville of Garvock. Garvock is near to Dunfermline. Andrew was a brother of the diplomats James Melville of Halhill and Robert Melville. In 1568 he had brought a gold chain to Mary when she was imprisoned in Lochleven Castle, which she had left with the goldsmith James Mosman to make into a necklace. He became the master of Mary's household in England. Andrew and Jane were placed in joint custody of Mary's remaining jewels and silver plate. Mary had asked Andrew to take some of her belongings back to Scotland and her son King James VI after her execution, including portraits of her ancestors and a piece of unicorn horn. Andrew Melville was detained in England for a time after Mary's execution, and James VI asked his ambassador Archibald Douglas to secure his release. Douglas found that Melville was already free.

=== Loss of the ferry boat ===
Jane and her servant Susannah Kirkcaldy were drowned on the 7 or 8 September 1589 crossing the river Forth between Burntisland, where the Melvilles held Rossend Castle, and Leith. The ferry boat was "midway under sail, and the tempest growing great carried the boat with such force upon a ship which was under sail as the boat sank presently." Jane had been summoned by James VI to await the arrival of Anne of Denmark, who was then expected to arrive at Leith.

The ferry boat sank after colliding with another vessel during the storm, and the sailors of the other boat, William Downie, Robert Linkhop, and John Watson of Leith were put on trial for the deaths of sixty passengers in January 1590. The outcome of the trial is not recorded. The loss of the ferry boat in stormy weather with all but two of the passengers was subsequently blamed on witchcraft. In the following year people from North Berwick were made to confess to raising the storms and incriminate Francis Stewart, Earl of Bothwell. According to the account of the witch trials in the tract Newes from Scotland, Agnes Sampson confessed to causing the storm by sinking a dead cat into the sea near Leith.

In later years the disaster came to be blamed on an error of the sailors, said to be drunk in calm weather by a writer in 1636, who added that £10,000 worth of goods and jewels were lost.

=== Andrew Melville of Garvock ===
Andrew Melville continued to serve as a Master of the Royal Household. He was given £200 to buy clothes to attend the coronation of Anne of Denmark. In 1591 he was on hand to protect the King at Holyroodhouse when he was surprised by Francis, Earl of Bothwell. Andrew, who lived on the north side of Holyrood close, armed himself and entered the palace through the Abbey using a secret passage. In July 1594 he and his brothers entertained the Danish and German ambassadors who had arrived for the baptism of Prince Henry.

He remarried to Elizabeth Hamilton and James VI gave a ring to his wife at the christening of their child in 1594. In 1600 they had a daughter, Janet, and a son Andrew in 1603, and John in 1604. He died in 1617. In January 1624 his daughter Anna married Sir James Murray of Tippermuir, known as the compiler of a miscellany of verse. His son George married the widow of the king's servant David Drummond.

== In fiction ==
In Friedrich Schiller's play Maria Stuart, Jane, as "Hanna Kennedy" is portrayed as Mary's nurse, and Andrew is "Melvil."

Jane is a principal character in Flora Carr's 2024 novel The Tower, which reimagines the captivity of Mary, Queen of Scots at Lochleven.
