= Wardrobe of Mary, Queen of Scots =

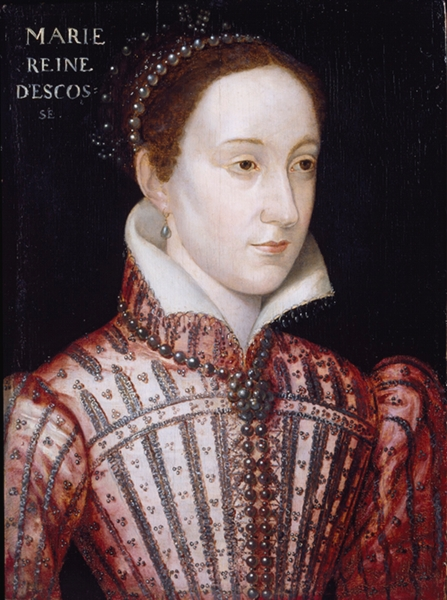
Mary, Queen of Scots in France, after François Clouet, her high collared doublet in pink or "incarnate" satin is embroidered with triplets of pearls, V&A

The wardrobe of Mary, Queen of Scots, was described in several contemporary documents, and many records of her costume have been published. Mary's clothing choices are apparent in the contexts of her appearance as a ruler, at her pastimes, and as a prisoner in England. Mary was involved in textile crafts, dressed her gentlewomen en-suite, organised events including costumed masques, and made and accepted gifts of clothing. Her choice of clothing at Fotheringhay for her execution has been examined as gesture and political theatre.

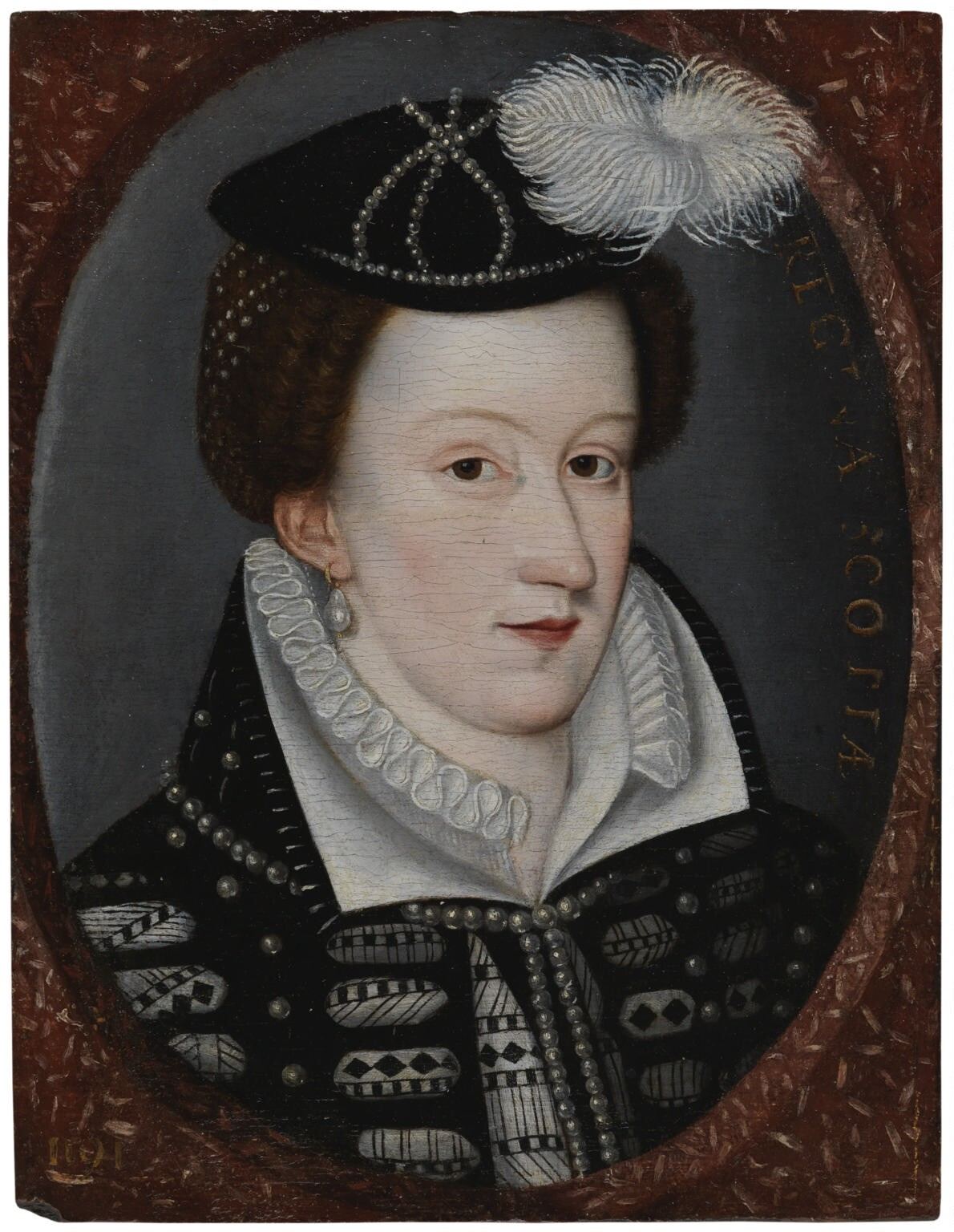
Mary's pearl embroidered black velvet bonnet, seen here at the National Portrait Gallery, also makes an appearance at Hardwick Hall

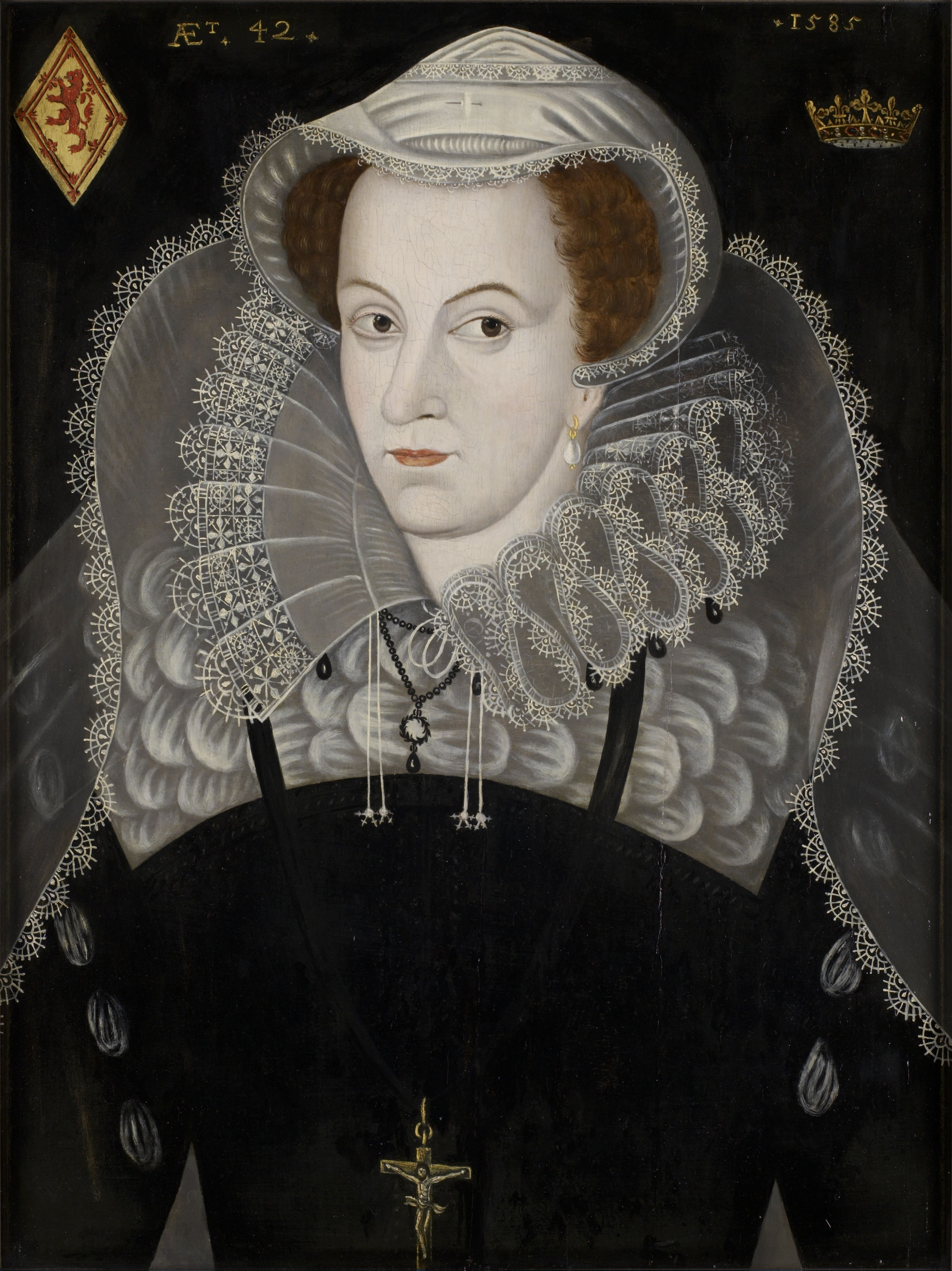
A version of the so-called "Sheffield Portrait" by a follower of Rowland Lockey, the most familiar image of Mary, featuring devotional jewellery against the black velvet background of the queen's robe, GAC

== Clothes for a queen ==
Mary, Queen of Scots (1542–1587) lived in France between 1548 and 1560 and clothing bought for her is particularly well-documented in the year 1551. Her wedding dress in 1558 was described in some detail. More detailed records of her costume survive from her time in Scotland, with purchases recorded in the royal treasurer's accounts and wardrobe accounts kept by Servais de Condé. Inventories were made of her clothing and her jewellery during her time in Scotland and after she abdicated and went to England. Details of her costume on the day of her execution at Fotheringhay Castle in 1587 were widely reported and circulated in manuscript.

Few details of known of Mary's clothes in infancy in Scotland, except that Margaret Balcomie, or Malcomy, had an allowance of soap and coal to warm the water to wash her linen. She became laundress to James VI at Stirling Castle in 1568. In 1548 her mother, Mary of Guise, asked her envoy Henri Cleutin to buy cloth of gold for a gown for her, from René Tardif and Robert Fichepain, merchants of the "argenterie" who served the French court. In January 1537, Tardif and Fichepain had supplied fabrics to James V for his wedding to Madeleine of Valois. In France, in 1551, René Tardif supplied velvet, satin, taffeta, and Holland linen. Mary's servant, Agathe Burgensis, made linen nightshirts and embroidered sleeves. The embroiderer serving the royal children was Pierre d'Anjou.

Mary's clothes were embroidered with jewels by her tailor Nicolas du Moncel, a white satin skirt front and sleeves featured 120 diamonds and rubies, and coifs for her hair had gold buttons or rubies. Du Moncel had been one of Mary of Guise's tailors and was listed in her household rolls as the valet des filles, a servant to the maids of honour. Mary mentioned his wages in one of her early letters to her mother. He made a farthingale, "une vertugalle", for her in 1551. Moncel received a pension as an usher of the chamber, according to a 1567 household roll.

Mary's portrait, and the portraits of the French royal children, were painted in June 1552. The painter was supervised by the governess of the royal children Françoise d'Humières. Germain Le Mannier, a painter was an usher in the children's household. A chalk drawing, attributed to François Clouet at Chantilly dated 1 June 1552 and July 1552 showing Mary at the age of 9 years 6 months may represent the painter's work. She wears slashed sleeves and her hair is in an embroidered caul banded with jewels.

A French household for Mary was formed in January 1554. In 1555, Mary gave some of her old gowns to her aunt, to be recycled as altar frontals. Mary wrote to her mother in December 1555 about a disagreement with Françoise de Paroy, and said she would have an inventory of her clothes since coming to France drawn up. She wanted Jean, possibly Jehan Allotot, a valet of her chamber to be promoted to Master of the Wardrobe.

Gift giving was an important part of court culture. In 1560, a courtier, Florimond Robertet, wrote of his plans to give Mary two pairs of long Granada silk stockings of the best kind, one of red or pink (incarnate) and another turquoise (bleu turquin) of an azure shade.

A woodcut illustration for a book on hunting by Jacques du Fouilloux, first printed in 1561, shows the author and Francis II. A full-length female figure in a portico in the background is very probably intended to depict Mary.

=== Masques in France ===
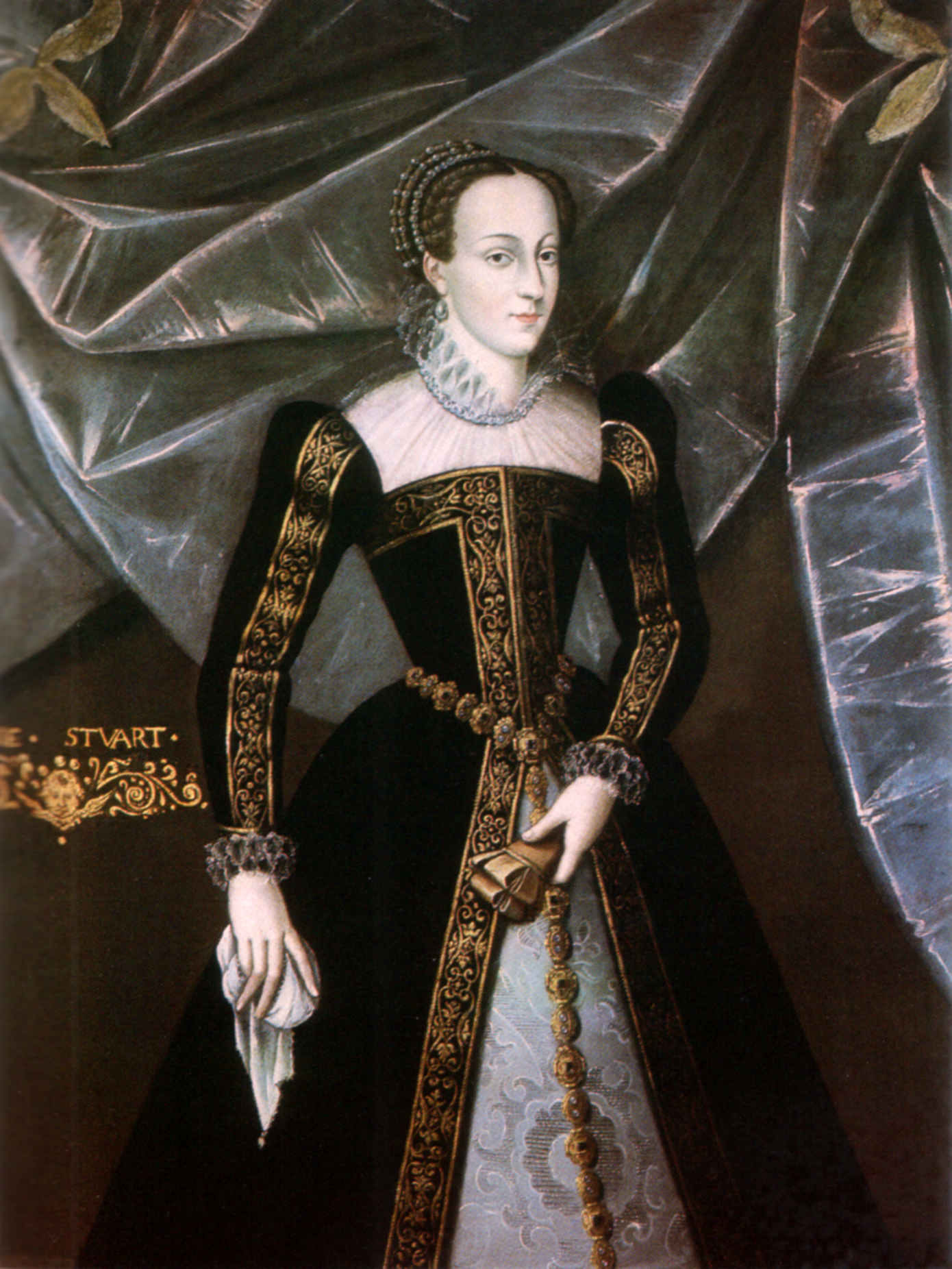
Mary's skirts are shaped by a French farthingale in the Blairs Museum portrait

Masques and dance were the heart of festivities at royal courts. Mary danced in masques (with the French governess Françoise d'Humières) in costumes made with lightweight silver and gold fabrics decorated with silver and gold metallic spangles. These were a type of sequin or "oes" called papillotes or espingles in French. Her dance teacher, or balladin, was Jehan Paulle alias Paule de Rege, otherwise known as "Giovan Paulo". Whether Italian or French, he was sent to teach the royal children and their companions to dance in January 1549 by Henry II of France and said to be "virtuous and well conditioned". In 1554, Mary played the Delphic Sibyl and Mary Fleming was the Erythraean Sibyl in a masque at Saint-Germain-en-Laye written by Mellin de Saint-Gelais.

In 1554 her governess Françoise d'Estainville, Dame de Paroy, wrote to Mary of Guise asking permission to buy two diamonds to lengthen one of Mary's headbands (worn on her French hood) with rubies and pearls. She also wanted to buy a new gown of cloth-of-gold for Mary to wear at the wedding of Nicolas, Count of Vaudémont (1524–1577), and Princess Joanna of Savoy-Nemours (1532–1568) at Fontainebleau. This new costume was intended to emulate the fashion adopted by the French princesses of the blood, Elisabeth of Valois and Claude of France (1547–1575), and accord with her status as queen of Scotland. In a letter to her mother, Mary mentions a pair of embroidered sleeves that were being made for her in Scotland.

Pageants at Mary's wedding in April 1558 were designed by Bartolomeo Campi of Pesaro, who had previously worked for Guidobaldo II della Rovere, Duke of Urbino, and designed costume for two court festivals in Urbino.

On 6 July 1559, Mary, as Reine dauphine, ordered counterfeit precious stones for masque costumes from a painter Éloi Lemannyer, for the weddings of Elisabeth of Valois and Margaret of Valois. Lemmanyer, an usher of the Dauphin's chamber, provided 1,262 imitation rubies, diamonds, and emeralds. Mary wore cloth of silver at their weddings. Her embroiderer up to 1561 was Henri Lemoyne or Le Moyne. He had worked for Mary of Guise in Scotland, and with the tailor Nicolas du Moncel had been a witness to a wedding at Falkland Palace.

According to family tradition, Marion or Marjory Livingstone, who was a member of the household of Mary of Guise around 1553, served as mistress of the robes to Mary, Queen of Scots, in France in 1559. A dress belonging to Marjory Livingstone was preserved at Cullen House until 1746. She married James Ogilvie of Cardell a master of Mary's household in France. Her 1577 will includes bequests of clothing.

=== Coin portraits ===
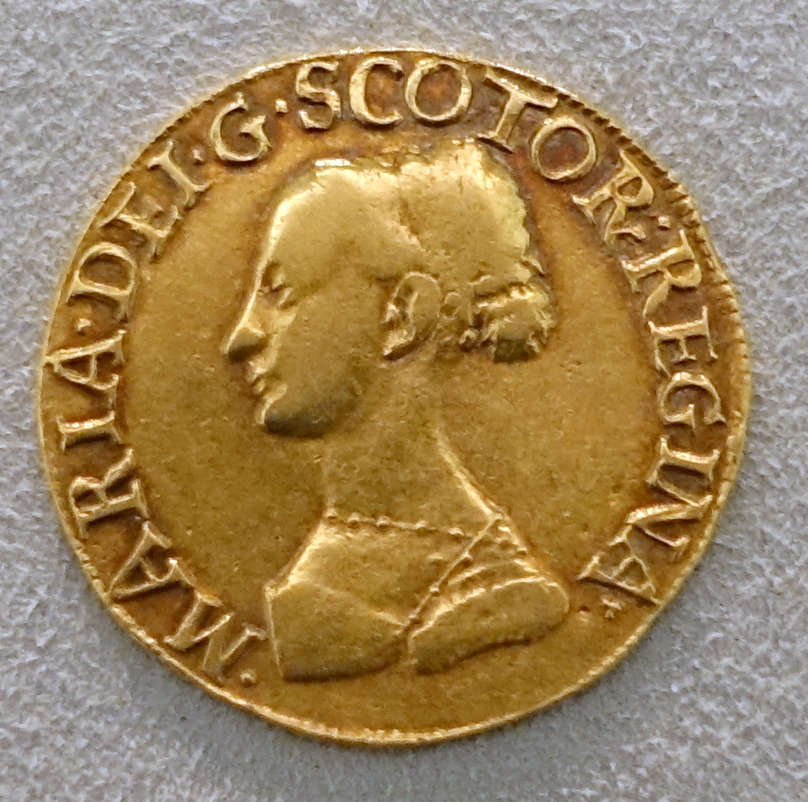
Portraits used for Mary's Scottish coinage reflect her costume in France in the 1550s

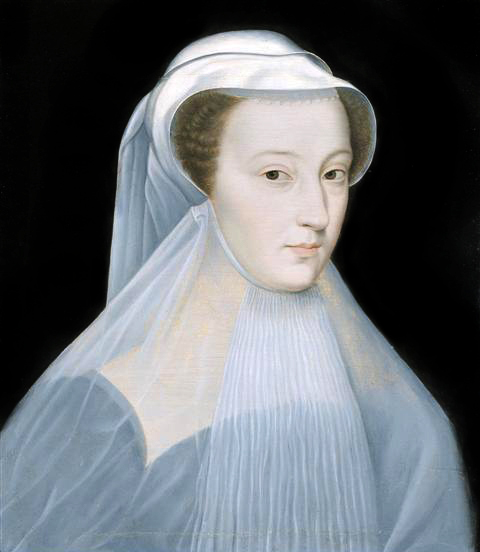
Mary in deuil blanc mourning, after François Clouet, Wallace Collection

Some of Mary's Scottish coinage was designed by John Acheson, who visited the court in France in 1553. Coins including the gold ryal show her in profile, wearing a caul or hairnet with two jewelled bands. Several sets of these bands appear in her jewel inventories listed in French in pairs as bordures or brodures, the bordure de touret at the forehead and the longer bordure d'oriellette over the head. In England, the equivalent accessories for French hoods were called upper and nether billiments.

The French word oriellette in records of Mary's costume may refer to the band at the front of a French hood sometimes called a "paste", though Antonia Fraser has suggested that a reference to 12 pairs of orilletes listed amongst linen sent to Mary at Carlisle in 1568 were bandages to act as earmuffs.

=== Mourning clothes in white and black ===
After the death of Mary I of England, and the death of her first husband Francis II of France in December 1560, Mary wore a form of mourning called deuil blanc, involving a white pleated cambric veil. Her portrait was drawn by François Clouet, and reproduced in several painted versions made after her death. The paintings indicate either a dark blue or green gown, not present in the drawing. Mary discussed her image as a woman in mourning with the English ambassador Nicholas Throckmorton in the context of sending her portrait to Queen Elizabeth. Throckmorton's letter suggests she was not wearing the deuil when they spoke in August 1560, and she said:

I perceive you like me better when I look sadly than when I look merrily, for it is told me that you desired to have me pictured, as when I wore the deuil.

Mary also wrote a poem on her portrait, image, deuil, and her pale violet cheek. The verse may be a response to the courtier poet Pierre de Bourdeille, seigneur de Brantôme, who wrote of her snow white complexion merging with the white deuil.

In September 1561 tailors and "boys" made black mourning "dule" riding cloaks and skirts for Mary, Queen of Scots, and her 15 ladies to wear at her Entry to Edinburgh. Mary wore black Florence serge, the other costumes were made from 50 ells of cheaper black stemming.

The royal accounts for November 1561 mention the women of the household transitioning into a "second mourning", or perhaps receiving their second allowance of black velvet and satin mourning clothes. In December, a mourning hood "chapperon de deuil", that had belonged to Mary of Guise was dismantled and its ermine trim was re-used on the gowns of gentlewomen for their second mourning. Some commentators contrasted Mary's mourning clothes with a lack of gravity and her taste for "joyousitie". According to David Calderwood, writing a later date:

In presence of council she was grave; but when she, her fiddlers, and dancing companions got the house alone, there might be seen unseemly scripping, notwithstanding that she wore the doole weid.

In December 1561, Mary solemnly observed the anniversary of her husband's death with Obertino Solaro, Monsieur de Moret, the ambassador of Savoy. The Queen's candle in the chapel at Holyrood was draped with black velvet. The English ambassador, Thomas Randolph, noted that the Scottish nobles at court did not wearing mourning "dewle" for the day. One "dule weid" mourning outfit comprised a large veil and seven components or pieces of "black crisp of silk". Randolph also noted Mary's practice of needlework, "sewing some work or other", in the council chamber of Holyrood Palace.

In April 1562, Randolph wrote about plans for Mary's interview with Elizabeth in England, and he thought the Scottish party would be dressed in black cloth, to suit Mary's wearing of mourning clothes and also save money. Mary asked the Privy Council to support her interview plans on 19 May. At the end of May, Mary invited the Hepburn or Cockburn Laird of Ormistoun, the Earl of Cassilis, and others to come the borders for the meeting of the queens. They were instructed that her "whole train will be clad in dule, therefore address you and such as will be in your company in like sort". The meeting (at York) was cancelled. Mary made a progress to Aberdeen and Inverness Castle instead. Randolph said the court had cast aside its "sorrowful garments and mourning weeds" in June 1563.

Mary incorporated mourning clothes into the ceremony when she married Lord Darnley on 29 July 1565. She entered the chapel of Holyroodhouse wearing "a great mourning gown of black" with a "great wide mourning hood". Randolph said the costume resembled her dress at her first husband's funeral. After the wedding and mass, she went to her bedchamber and courtiers unpinned these garments, and her ladies put on her new costume. There were three wedding rings, a gold ring with a rich diamond and red enamelling was perhaps the principal. Her costume and its solemn removal was described by Thomas Randolph in a letter to the Earl of Leicester:

She had on her backe the greate murning gowne of blacke, with the greate wyde murning hood, not unlyke unto that whiche she woore the deulfull daye of the buriall of her husbonde ... there [in her chamber] beinge required according to the solemnitie to off her care, and leave asyde these sorrowful garments ... she suffreth them that stood by, every man that could approve, to tayke owte a pyne, and so being committed unto her ladies, changed her garments.

Mary's mourning clothes after the death of Darnley in February 1567 required 24 papers of pins. The fabric was black serge of Florence, with some black plaid, the skirt and sleeves were silk chamlet lined with taffeta, the headdresses were linen and camerage (cambric). Florian Broshere, the tapestry worker and embroiderer, draped her bed and hanged the chapel at Holyrood with fine French black.

=== Clothing in the inventories and treasurer's accounts ===
During Mary's adult reign in Scotland, purchases of textiles for her clothes and payments for tailors appear in the accounts of the Lord Treasurer. Her mother, Mary of Guise, as Regent (1554-1560) had paid for her clothes from her own French incomes. Mary had a wardrobe as a department of her household, with several officers and artisans including tailors and embroiderers, and the "tapissiers" who looked after tapestry, beds, and furniture with her menusier, Nicholas Guillebault, the household carpenter or upholsterer. In March 1566 she rewarded her French embroiderer, Pier Veray, with the lucrative position of clerk of the customs of Edinburgh, an office taken from a suspect in the murderer of David Rizzio. Charles La Brosse or Labroce was also working as her embroiderer at this time. There were workers outside the household too, mostly in Edinburgh, including the Flemish shoemaker Fremyn Alezard and the furrier Archibald Leche or Leich. In the 1590s, one of Fremyn's former apprentices Alexander Crawfurd made shoes for Mary's son James VI.

Servais de Condé, a valet of the chamber, assisted by Angell Marie, perfumer and varlet of the wardrobe, kept a written record in French tracking the use of the more expensive fabrics. A broadly similar record of fabrics used by Mary of Guise from 1552 to 1554 also survives. Mary imported some of her fabrics from Flanders, buying over £300 worth of silk and velvet in September 1565, while purchases from Scottish merchants are also recorded. Cuthbert Ramsay provided merchandise worth £1583 Scots in July 1566. Textiles in his shop were detailed in the will of his wife, Jonet Fleming.

In this example from July 1564, black velvet was given to Mary's tailor Jean de Compiègne, also known as Jehan Poulliet, to make a purse for kerchiefs:

Plus a Jehan de Conpiegne i quartier de veloux noyr pour faire une grand bource pour la Royne lequelz fert a metre les mouchoy.
More, to Jehan de Compiegne, a quarter of black velvet to make a big purse for the queen, which she carries to hold kerchiefs.

Inventories of Mary's clothes written in French survive in the National Archives of Scotland and were printed by Joseph Robertson in 1863. This is an example of a skirt, with a note that it was given to the queen's favourite Mary Beaton:

Une vasquyne de satin cramoysy enrechye d'une bande d'ung passement d'argent faict a jour et borde d'ung passement d'argent.
Au moy de Fevvrier la Royne donne laditz vasquine a Mademoysel de Beton.

This was one of fifteen embroidered skirts with passementerie listed in 1562. There were six plain skirts, and fifteen skirts of cloth of gold or silver. A cloth of gold skirt with matching sleeves was given to Magdalen Livingstone for her wedding. A skirt of cloth of silver was unpicked in 1566 for fabric to dress a bed. Mary had several skirts made to match doublets, in silk camlet, velvet, and satin. Mary wore skirts over a shaped farthingale, these were lined or doubled with taffeta, and their bell-shaped form stiffened with "girds" of whale baleen. In December 1563 the tailor and valet of the wardrobe Jacques de Senlis reworked an old black velvet skirt that had belonged to Mary of Guise into a new style for the queen.

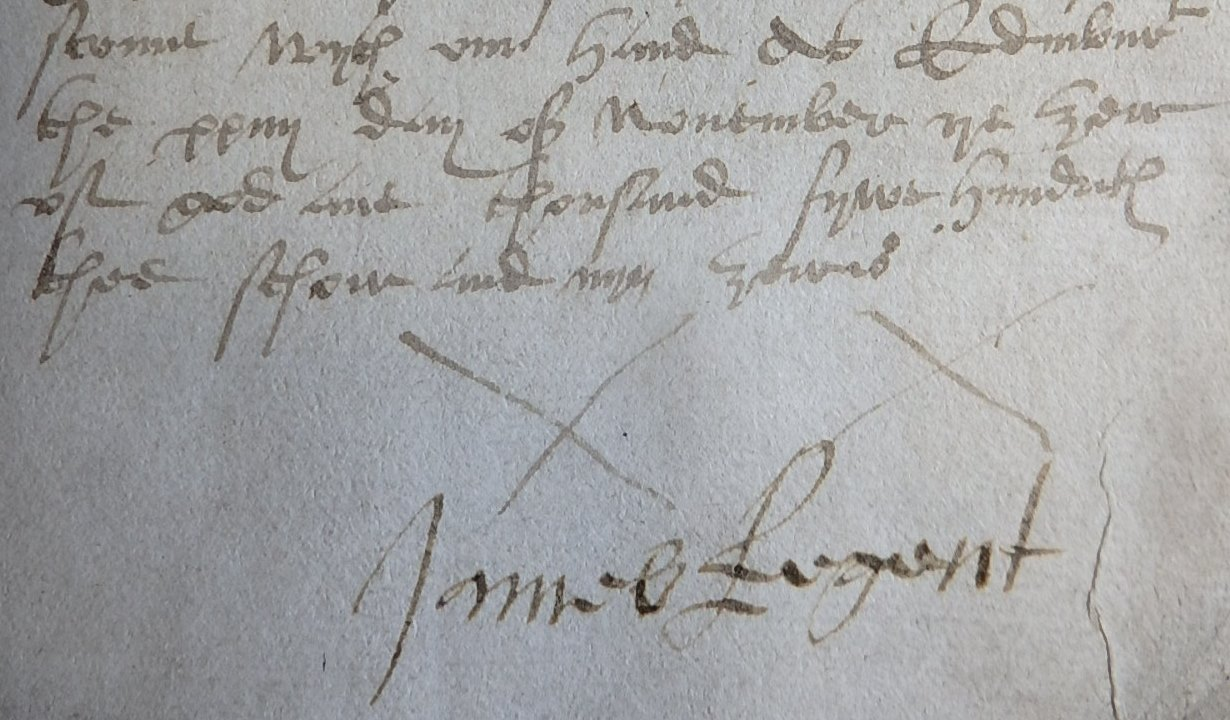
Signature of James Stewart, as Regent Moray, on an inventory of Mary's goods, (National Records of Scotland)

Hats for Mary and Darnley were made by Johnnie Dabrow, a Portuguese milliner who had settled in Edinburgh. Linen was bought to line her bath, and a kind of canvas or linen called "plet" was used to line coffers for stroting clothes and to wrap jewels. The accounts also mention furnishings and beds, and a variety of accessories including collars for the queen's little dogs, "les petitz chiens de la Royne", made from a length of vintage blue velvet.

The Scots language and older French vocabulary in the inventories of Mary, Queen of Scots can be difficult to read and interpret. Some linen mouchoirs in the inventories may have been handkerchiefs, while others appear to be head coverings. A French word caleçons appearing as "callesons" or as a "pair of kelsounis", in lists of her linen, may be a word for linen hose or stockings, or for pairs of drawers. Linen was given to the governess of the fool known as La Jardiniere to make three "paires de callesons" and some "mouchoirs". One of Mary's French gentlewomen Mademoiselle Rallay made night caps or "coifs" for the queen from Holland linen.

Some help is given by the original cross-referencing numbers which were printed in the 19th-century editions. French and Scots language entries for the same item can be compared, in many cases giving insightful contemporary translations. The letter "H" seen in the inventories refers to items confiscated from Huntly Castle, and a letter "S" means an item was at Stirling Castle.

Mary's French vocabulary and the French words used by her clerks caused confusion when she was in England. In 1584, Ralph Sadler had to explain that she wanted "Turkey-work foot carpets" (rugs) to lay around her bed. A French phrase used for these rough-textured hairy rugs tapisserie velue had been confused with velvet cloths, tapisserie de veloux.

Notes added to the inventories record gifts of clothing that Mary made from her wardrobe to favourite aristocrats, courtiers, and women of her household. She gave a skirt to the "little daughter of her laundress", Margaret Douchall who later followed her mother into royal service and married Jerome Bowie, a servant in the wine cellar. Costumes were given to household servants. In March 1567 five pages and seven lackeys were provided with riding cloaks of black stemming, pourpoints (doublets), and Mantua-style bonnets and hats by the tailor John Powlett (Jean de Compiègne). The list of fabrics survives in French and Scots. The smart and uniform appearance of these servants, visible when Mary travelled, greatly contributed to the impression of royal magnificence. These black clothes were the official mourning for the death of Lord Darnley.

=== Beds and bedding ===
A candle set fire to Mary's bed at Stirling Castle in September 1561. Much of the work to make and maintain bed curtains and coverings was performed by Mary's "tapesars" or tappisiers. Mary had inherited a number of beds from James V and Mary of Guise. These impressive beds conveyed royal status and some were positioned in public rooms. Mary acquired beds from Huntly Castle in 1562 after the battle of Corrichie, and these were converted into a newly fashionable "four nuikit" style by her tailors and "tapesars" in Edinburgh.

In November 1565, Pierre Martin, a "tapesar", worked on three beds made with green plaiding, he made fabric covers for bed posts, and in November 1566, with (or for) Margaret Carwood, he made a green covering and a canopy lined with plaiding for a bed, with bedding stuffed with feathers described as a "matt" and "two palyeasis", and sheets described in French as linceux. Perhaps in advance of the baptism of the Prince James, fabric was issued in October 1566 to the "tapissier" for a green velvet bed, the embroidered bed (lictz d'ouvraige), for the "bed of the Phoenix", and the "bed of the Jennet". The ceremony at Stirling involved a bed of cloth of silver and gold for the Prince. In 1567, an embroiderer Pierre Oudry embellished the bed of cloth of gold and silver for Mary's use. Florence, another "tapesar", made black "dule" mourning hangings for a bed after the murder of Lord Darnley.

Much of the work of the tapissiers did not involve tapestry or wall hangings. Pierre Martin made table cloths of velvet backed with taffeta, and canvas bags for Mary's slippers and laundry. The wardrobe record mentions that he used violet taffeta to pick out an escutcheon for Mary's stomacher and to finish a bonnet, "de taffetas viollet pour piquer ung ecuysson pour metre sur lestomac de la Royne avec ung bonnet". Palliases or mattresses for the royal guard were made by Pierre Martin from the poor quality canvas used to wrap Mary's furnishings for transport. Another "tapissier" used a fabric called "plette blanche" to make wrappings and pouches for the Queen's jewelled girdles and golden head dresses.

== Ceremony and special costume ==
=== At Parliament ===
Mary wore her crown and robes for state ceremonies, including the first day of the Parliament of Scotland on 26 May 1563. Her robes were later described as a "rob ryall of purper velvot embroiderit about with gold, furrit with spottit armenis (ermine) and a band about". Scottish monarchs had robes for their coronations and for Parliament. When Charles I came to Scotland for his coronation in 1633 he had the old Parliament robes of James IV refurbished and perfumed for his use. In March 1566, Mary's tailor Jehan de Compiegne made her headdresses of cloth of silver to wear in Parliament, or at the election of the Lords of the Articles, presumably when not wearing the crown.

John Knox criticised the appearance of Mary's gentlewomen at Parliament in 1563 as a "stinking pride of women" and wrote that preachers denounced the "taregetting of their taillies" (apparently the embellishment of their costumes), and there were calls for reform by sumptuary law "for order to be taken for apparel". Knox also criticised the costume and jewellery of Mary's gentlewomen at Holyrood Palace. In 1557, Knox had advised his female Protestant followers in Edinburgh not to wear farthingales or elaborate hair styles and attires.

=== Riding clothes and archery ===
Mary's costume would have included outfits designed for riding and hunting, a pastime she enjoyed. She rode sidesaddle or astride depending on occasion. At this time, women might wear a safeguard when riding sidesaddle, known in French as a devantiére, which can be described as a wrap-around apron, possibly worn over some kind of breeches or a shorter skirt more convenient for riding. In Scotland, these apron safeguards seem to have been known as "wardegards" and in Mary's time, as "devanters". Mary sometimes ordered riding clothes of black stemming fabric for herself and her gentlewomen. The inventories mention a caparison for a horse made of cloth of gold and silver, which Mary gave to Lord Darnley in September 1566.

Mary had special gloves for archery, made from velvet. The French wardrobe record includes "veloux pour faire une gan pour la Royne lequel fert tirrer de l'arc". In April 1562, Mary shot in the butts in her privy garden at St Andrews and took part in a competition with the Master of Lindsay against the Earl of Mar and one of her ladies. The conspirators who murdered Rizzio considered sending Mary to Stirling Castle where she could harmlessly shoot her bow in the garden and practice her embroidery. Mary continued to practice archery with a long bow in England. Dominique Bourgoing describes her riding to hunt in August 1586 with Bastian Pagez carrying her cloak and the valet Annibal carrying her crossbow and arrows.

Mary was said to have dressed as a man to ride from Borthwick Castle to Dunbar on 10 June 1567. George Buchanan wrote that Mary changed into a shorter skirt, or little tunic, reaching just below the knee, before appearing at the battle of Carberry, presumably a skirt length worn when riding beneath her safeguard, and not as she would usually wear in public. A French account (written by the Captain of Inchkeith) describes a short garment covering her legs halfway "une cotte rouge qui ne luy venoyt que à demie de la jambe". A contemporary sketch of her surrender shows her accompanied by Mary Seton, both riding sidesaddle and possibly wearing safeguards. Before the battle she left a change of clothes in a chest at Fa'side Castle. On other occasions, Mary may have worn hose called chausses when riding. Mary also wore possibly bifurcated linen "callesons", but these do not seem to have been riding breeches.

=== Highland costume ===
James V, Mary's father, had worn Highland clothes, made from a "tartane" fabric and shirts called "Heland sarks". Mary and her court wore Highland clothes in Argyll and during visits to the north and Inverness. In June 1563 the court prepared "Hyeland apparell" for the progress to Argyll and Inveraray. Mary would wear a "marvellous fair" costume which had been a gift from Agnes Campbell the wife of James MacConel or MacDonald of Dunyvaig. The inventories of Mary's father, James V of Scotland, include Highland clothes, possibly made for his voyage around Scotland in 1540.

The wardrobe accounts mention white fabrics to line a box and "plette" to wrap Mary's coifs and jewels "pour porter au voyage que la Royne fit en Arguylle", for carriage on the Queen's journey to Argyll. The French word "plette" can also mean a plaid or arisaid, Mary's tailor Baltazar Hully made "une plette bigaree" for Mary to wear in Argyll The word "bigaree" may mean finished with a decorative scalloped edge.

A "Hunt Hall" for the use of Mary, Queen of Scots, was built in Glenartney by James Stewart, 1st Lord Doune in August 1563. The French author Brantôme claimed to have seen Mary in Highland costume. He said she looked like a goddess, as her beauty transformed such costume, as anyone who had seen her portrait in such clothes would agree. Such a portrait, if it ever existed, does not survive. Brantôme, like other French writers of the period, writes of the "barbarous fashions of the savages of her country". Mary's accounts mentions cloaks and hose, made "à la façon de sauvage" probably a version of the arisaid.

Locally made woollen tartan or plaid was bought in Inverness. These cloths may not have closely resembled modern tartan fabrics. Some "Highland" items appear in inventories, including three Highland mantles in black, blue, and white, perhaps relating to these progresses, or used as masque costume. Among Mary's smocks or shirts, called "sarks", were four English blackwork sarks, and a "hieland syd sark of yallow lyning pasmentit with purpour silk and silver". Changing clothes to cross regional boundaries was traditional. Randolph, the English ambassador, joked about having to wear a yellow "safferon shyrte or a hylande pladde" if he went to Argyll.

== Masques and dance costume ==
Mary enjoyed dance and the costumed performance of the masque. Red and white taffeta masque clothes made by Jacques Senlis in February 1562 were probably intended for the wedding of the Earl of Moray and Mary's friend Agnes Keith, and red and white costumes were made for three lutenists. Costumes were made by Mary's tailor Jacques de Senlis for dancers and lute players who performed for Mary and the court during a wedding at Castle Campbell on 10 January 1563. They were dressed as shepherds in white taffeta with purses or satchels made of white damask.

A masque in December 1563 involved three large blue velvet Swiss bonnets and wigs. There was also a blue velvet bonnet for Nichola the Fool, and Mademoiselle Rallay was given canvas to fashion wigs. The occasion may have been her twenty-first birthday, where she tired herself with "dancing over long". Mary's tailor Jehan de Compiegne made costumes from orange "changing" or shot taffeta for a masque at a banquet in February 1565 at Holyrood Palace, with a smaller costume in the same fabric for a young girl at court. The event was held in the ballroom or salle du balle at Holyrood Palace.

The English ambassador Thomas Randolph described the Twelfth Night or Shrovetide masques and banquets of February 1564. The four Maries and the queen's ladies wore white and black at one banquet. Costumed figures represented Eros, Chastity, and Mutual Love (the love of the two sister sovereigns, Mary and Elizabeth). Verses were sung or recited as the courses were brought in by gentlemen wearing black and white. Mary herself in white and black with white and black lace at her neck wore no other jewels except a diamond ring, a gift from Elizabeth I, worn as a pendant. In Randolph's words:

The Queen of the Bean (Mary Fleming) that day was in cloath of silver, her head, her neck, her shoulders, the rest of her body, so besett with stones, that more in our whole jewell house wer not to be found. The Queene herselfe apparalled that day in collours whyt and black, no nether (other) jewell or gold about her that day bot the ring that I brought her from the Queen's Majestie (Elizabeth) hanging at her breast with a lace of whyt and black about her neck. The cheare that day was great.

=== Black and white ===
Mary seems to have emulated the fashion of other courts by dressing herself and her ladies in black and white for the masque, echoing colours adopted by Diane de Poitiers, and Elizabeth I was entertained by a masque of men dressed in black and white at the house of Sir Richard Sackville in July 1564. Elizabeth told the Spanish ambassador that black and white were her colours. For Elizabeth (and Mary), according to heraldic lore, black and white may have symbolised purity, steadfastness, and virginity.

=== Silver tock ===
Fabrics bought for Mary included "silver tock" or "toig", a metallic tinsel fabric that was much less expensive than cloth of silver, at 20 shillings for an ell length. Silver tock was particularly used in masques, in France when Mary was a child in 1550 and later in Scotland in the reign of Mary's son James VI. A blue satin masque coat was decorated with silver stars, "starnis of toig", and six red coats were lined with "toige of silver". A red coar was "begareit", slashed to show the silver tock lining of its bodice. Another inventory mentions "seven coifs of cloth of silver" and the "railyettis of the same". These were orillettes, fore edge bands or pastes for French hoods possibly used in a masque.

== Masquing, male costume, and Lord Darnley ==
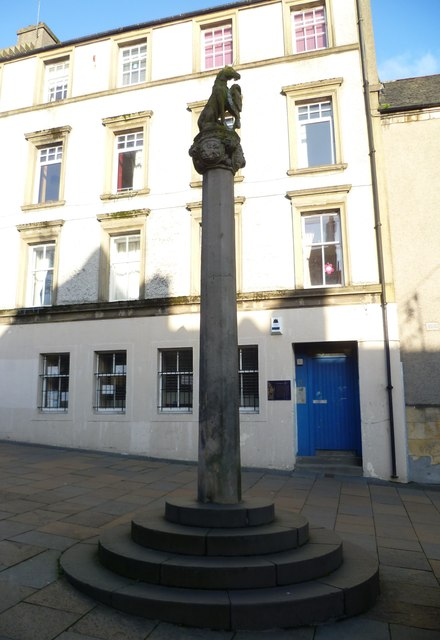
Mary, Queen of Scots is said to have danced around the Market Cross of Stirling disguised "in homely sort" in July 1566.

A French envoy reported in January 1565 that Mary spent all her mornings at the hunt and the evenings at dances and masques. Several sources refer to Mary and her ladies wearing male costume for dance and for disguising or "guising", masked visits and promenades in Scottish towns. On Easter Monday in April 1565 Mary and her ladies dressed like "bourgeois wives" and walked up and down the steep streets of Stirling, collecting contributions for a banquet. The activity can be identified with the custom of "Hocking", more usually recorded as an English custom. Thomas Randolph's report of this Easter dressing-up custom reveals that the clothes worn by ladies at court were notably different from the costume worn by merchant's wives or other women living and working in Scotland's burgh towns, probably both in terms of fabrics and style. Mary celebrated Easter at Stirling Castle this year, not in Edinburgh. She had compared herself to a "bourgeois wife" in February 1565 while staying in a merchant's house in St Andrews, keeping a small household with little ceremony, and no cloth of estate, the canopy used above a throne.

In the days after her marriage, in July 1565, Mary and Darnley walked up and down Edinburgh High Street in disguise with David Rizzio and "old Lady Seton". For a masque to entertain the French ambassador, Nicolas d'Angennes, seigneur de Rambouillet, who brought the Order of Saint Michael for Darnley, the tailor Jean de Compiegne made six costumes decorated with flames made of cloth of gold reused from old cushion covers. During the masque the queen's ladies, "cled in men's apperrell", presented 8 Scottish dirks or daggers to the French guests, with black velvet scabbards embroidered with gold. A chronicle called the Diurnal of Occurrents described the scene in February 1566:

And the sammin nycht at evin, our soveranis maid ane banket to the ambassatour foirsaid Rambouillet, in the auld chappell of Halyrudhous, quhilk wes reapparrellit with fyne tapestrie, and hung magnificentlie, be the saidis lordis maid the maskery efter supper in ane honourable maner. And upoun the ellevint day of the said moneth, the king and quene in lyikmanner bankettit the ambassatour; and at evin our soveranis maid the maskrie and mumschance, in the quhilk the quenis grace, and all hir Maries and ladies wer all cled in men's apperrell; and everie ane of thame presentit ane quhingar, bravelie and maist artificiallie made and embroiderit with gold, to the ambassatour and his gentilmen, everie one of thame according to his estate.

Randolph wrote that Mary, Darnley, and David Rizzio took part in a costly masque with seven other dancers in rich attire to welcome Rambouillet. Darnley's costume for his investiture in the Order was given to a French herald (Saint Michael, a Monsieur d'Oze) as a prerequisite, these clothes were of satin guarded with black velvet and satin, sewn with aglets of gold. Rambouillet stayed in Edinburgh's Canongate, and subsequently the Kirk Session found that Kathy Lintoun was pregnant by one of the Queen's "sangstaris" called Missall, and a number of local women were slandered as prostitutes and said to have visited the lodging dressed in men's clothes.

Mary went to Alloa Tower about a month after the birth of Prince James, and was said to have danced around the Market Cross of Stirling "abandoning herself to riotousness" while "arrayed in homely sort". When Mary was riding on horseback, she seems sometimes to have ridden astride, and sometimes sidesaddle, as a deliberate gender coded choice and statement which would have implications for her costume. One of her hunting saddles was described as ung harnoy de chasse fect a la ristre, a saddle made in the style of a German Ritter knight.

=== Wedding of Nicolas Wardlaw ===
On 31 August 1566, Mary's half-brother James Stewart, 1st Earl of Moray wrote from Stirling to the treasurer Robert Richardson to ensure Nicola or Nicolas Wardlaw, a daughter of Henry Wardlaw of Torrie and known as Madame Torrie, one of the queen's gentlewomen, received a purple velvet gown with passments of gold for her wedding to Patrick Wood of Bonnyton. Such gifts were customary, though usually organised by Mary herself. Mary was at Drummond Castle, on her way back to Stirling after hunting at Glen Artney. Moray wrote that Nicolas Wardlaw received the gift because "she hes bene ane auld servand and is sic a gentilwoman as is worthie to be furtherit".

There was a swift turnaround as the clothes were needed at Stirling for the wedding on Tuesday 6 September. Richardson passed a detailed list of requirements called a "memorial", written in French and signed by Mary, to Servais de Condé. Servais gave the outfit and materials to a page to carry from Edinburgh to Stirling. The "memorial" survives and was translated into Scots for the treasurer's accounts. The gown was made of 11 French measure ells of "violat velvote" or vellours viollet. Her white satin sleeves and skirt front, the grand manches and davant, were decorated with narrow gold braids, petite natte d'or. Her companion in Mary's bed chamber, Jonet Seton, was given a similar gown on her marriage to John Bellenden.

=== Costume and the baptism ===
On 5 September 1566 Mary ordered fabrics for the household of her son, the future James VI, at Stirling Castle, for beds and bedding for Margaret Beaton, Lady Reres and the gentlewomen appointed as rockers of the prince's cradle. Taffeta was bought to make costumes for the masque at James' baptism. Mary was concerned to impress the guests at the baptism and gave orders for the clothes of her lords and followers. John Forster, an English border warden, heard that Mary had ordered clothes for the Earl of Bothwell in blue, the Earl of Argyll in red, and the Earl of Moray in green, "at her own charge". She asked her lords to each bring a certain number of retainers dressed in colours. Lord Darnley's costume was said to have been neglected. According to George Buchanan, in response to criticism about disparities in Darnley and Bothwell's dress, Mary blamed the embroiderers and tailors, but it was known that she had embroidered some details for Bothwell's clothes herself.

In January 1567 the tailor Jehan de de Compiegne was given clothes including a black "Almain" or German-style cloak. In February the jester George Styne or Stevin had a costume made of blue kersey, and in March Nichola the fool had new linen. 10 ells of linen were bought for lining Mary's bathtub, and canvas for bathing was delivered to Toussaint Courcelles.

=== Bastian's wedding masque ===
On the night that Lord Darnley was killed by an explosion at the Kirk o'Field, Mary attended the wedding banquet and masque for her servant Bastian Pagez and Christily Hog. Mary gave the bride satin, velvet, and green ribbons for her gown. She also gave her servant Margaret Carwood clothes for her wedding. George Buchanan mentions the "masking-dance" at the wedding in his Dectection. Darnley's father, the Earl of Lennox later produced a narrative of events which says that some witnesses said Mary was dressed in men's clothing on that night, "which apparel she loved oftentimes to be in, in dancings secretly with the King her husband, and going in masks by night through the streets".

In November 1569, some costume for masques, "dansyne" or "maskyne cleise", was obtained by Regent Moray and his wardrobe servant, James Murray, brother of the laird of Polmaise. An inventory was receipted by his lawyer and secretary Robert Fleschour. Amy Blakeway suggests that Moray may intended to use them for festivities at Christmas time, but such plans would have been upset when fugitives from the Rising of the North crossed the border.

=== Dule and Mary's third wedding ===
Mary wore "dule weed" mourning clothes after the death of Darnley, the gown was of Florence serge and five double ells of black "plaiding" were used. The "Queen's dule" required 24 papers of pins. At the same time, Jean de Compiegne alias Powlet made a cloak and a "devanter" skirt of the same black serge dressed with ribbond (possibly a riding outfit). When Mary married Darnley her wedding guests had removed pins from her dule. On the day that she married the Earl of Bothwell, 15 May 1567, she wore dule again. On the same day she ordered a lavish gown of black figured velvet embroidered with gold and silver thread and gown passementerie.

== In conflict ==
When Mary was at Inverness in September 1562 she said, after seeing the armed guard return from watch at night, that she regretted she "was not a man to know what life it was to lie all night in the fields, or to walk upon the causeway with a jack and a knapschall (helmet), a Glasgow buckler, and a broad sword". Thomas Randolph wrote that Mary wore a "secret and privy defence on her body" while riding during the Chaseabout Raid. This was probably a kind of jack.

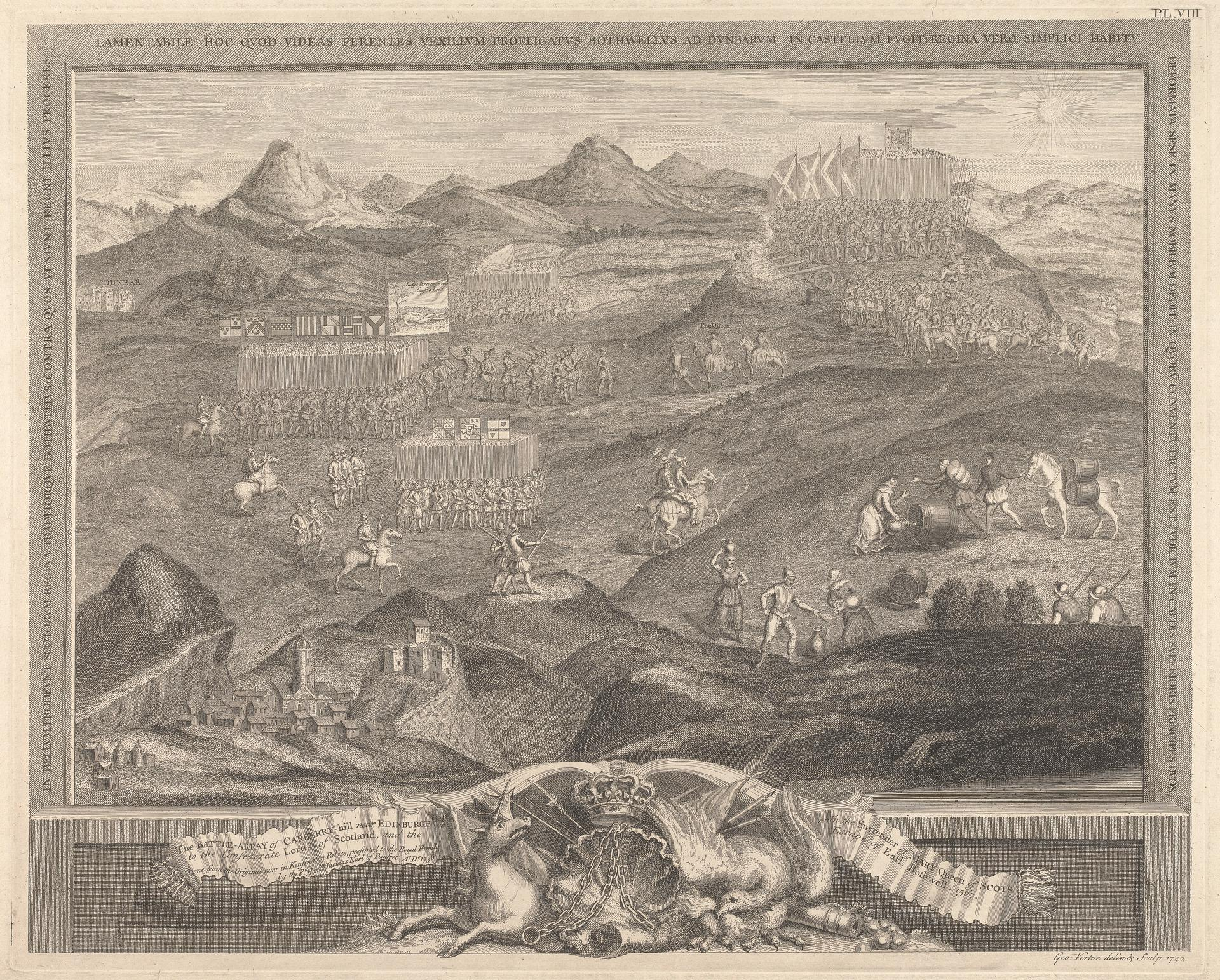
Engraving based on a contemporary sketch of the battle of Carberry Hill which includes Mary riding, led by William Kirkcaldy of Grange, and Mary Seton alongside

After the murder of Lord Darnley, when Mary seemed likely to marry the Earl of Bothwell, William Kirkcaldy of Grange wrote to the Earl of Bedford, an English diplomat, that Mary did not care if she lost France, England and Scotland for Bothwell's sake, and she had said she would go with him to the world's end in a white petticoat;

sho caris not to lose France Ingland and her owne countrie for him, and sall go with him to the warldes ende in ane white peticote or she leve him.

A report written by the Captain of Inchkeith, Robert Anstruther, and a chronicle called the Diurnal of Occurrents, mention that Mary wore male clothing and was "booted and spurred" on her ride from Borthwick Castle to Dunbar Castle in 1567, and she is sometimes said to have been disguised as a page.

Mary wore a short red petticoat at knee-length at Dunbar the next day before the battle of Carberry Hill. Anstruther's report written in French describes another item, but the words appear to be illegible. According to George Buchanan, Mary changed into a short skirt at Fawside Castle on the morning of 15 June 1567 before the battle of Carberry. She left some clothes behind in a chest, including a gown of black "estamet" (stemming) embroidered with grains of jet, a crimson camlet dress, a plaid, a great cloak, and a hat embroidered with gold and silver, with a panache. The black gown was "faict a la souvaige", perhaps meaning Highland fashion. Mary kept her linen in a small case covered with sea wolf's skin, une petite mallette de poil de loup marin.

An English soldier and border official, William Drury, heard another description of Mary's costume at this time, that she was dressed at the field of battle, "after the attire and fashion of the women of Edinburgh, in a red petticoat tied with points, a partlet, a velvet hat, and muffler". The partlet, worn over the shoulders, does not frequently appear in the queen's inventories but was included in lists of townswomen's property. Both male apparel and bourgeois costume featured in the clothing worn by Mary for masques and disguisings.

== Abdication and Lochleven Castle ==
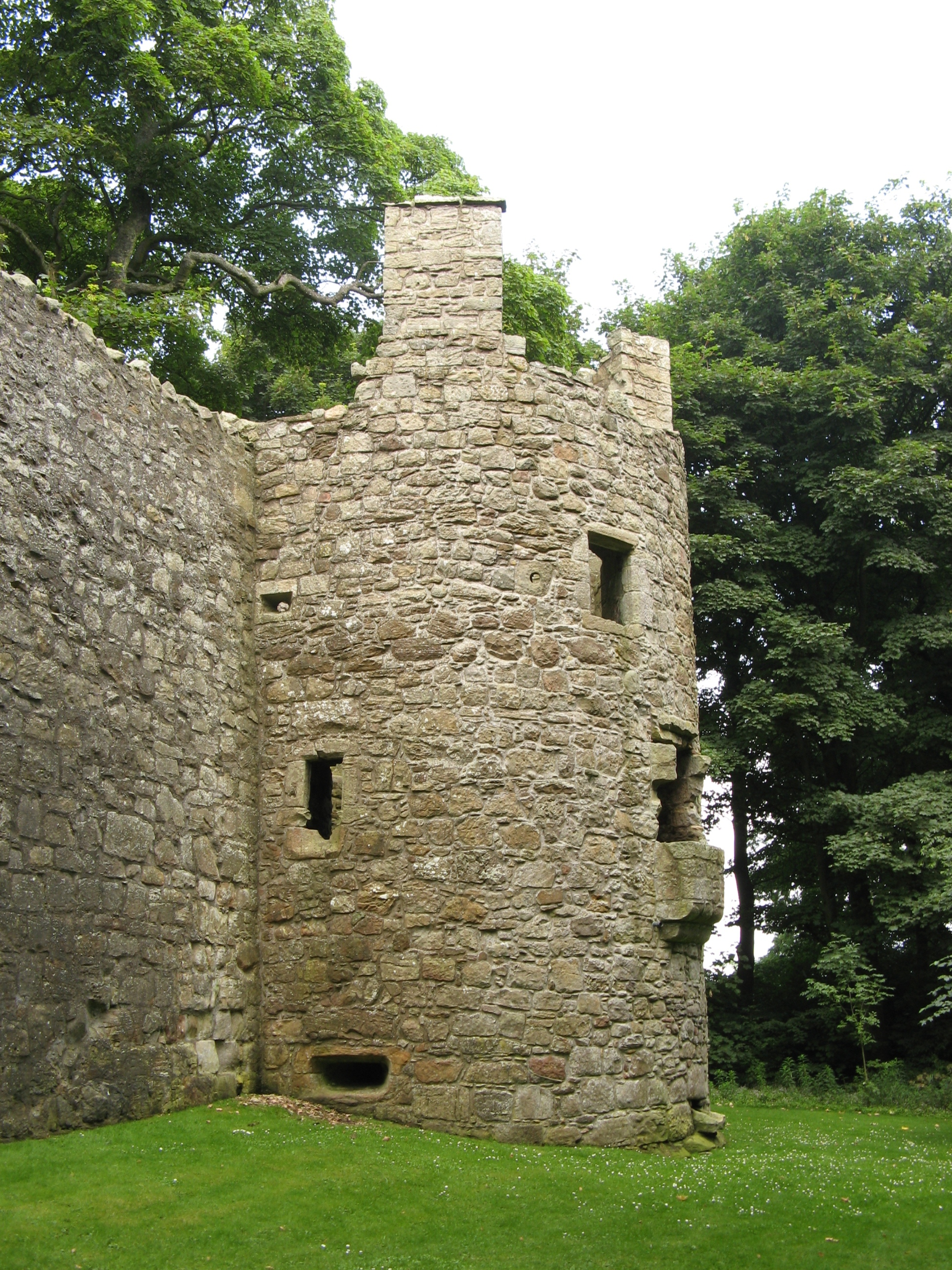
While confined at Lochleven Castle, Mary may have made a purse for her watch, later sent to her England.

After the battle of Carberry Hill, Mary was taken from Edinburgh to Lochleven Castle. According to John Lesley, "in the night privily she was conveyed, and with haste, in disguised apparel, to the strong fort of Lochleven, and after a few days, being stripped out and spoiled of all her princely attirement, was clothed with a coarse brown cassock".

Mary's secretary Claude Nau later wrote that Francisco de Busso, keeper of Holyroodhouse, gave her wardrobe to her enemies. When James Stewart, 1st Earl of Moray returned from France, he set a tailor who worked for his wife Annas or Agnes Keith, Countess of Moray to make Mary a new violet gown (une robbe de drap violet), and he let her have some of her older worthless clothes.

The treasurer's accounts mention a package of sewing and embroidery equipment in October 1566, which was sent from Edinburgh to Stirling Castle for Mary and her ladies which included six double hanks of gold and silver thread, with eight "mousis" with needles. After a time, clothes and sewing thread for embroidery and other textile works were sent to Mary in her prison at Lochleven Castle. The tailor Jean de Compiegne usually supplied her with silk thread for sewing and crochet, "soye à coudre et crochetz". On 17 July 1567, she requested the services of an embroiderer to draw patterns for her, to "draw forth such work as she would be occupied about". At this time, according to Nicholas Throckmorton, Mary thought she was seven weeks pregnant with Bothwell's child.

In August, Robert Melville brought Paris black, broad red, and fine English cloth to Lochleven for Mary's gowns. On 3 September, Mary wrote to Robert Melville to ask Servais de Condé to send silk thread and sewing gold and silver, doublets and skirts of black and white satin, a red incarnate doublet, a taffeta loose gown, clothes that she had asked Lady Livingstone to send, and clothes for her maidens. Mary also wanted camerage (cambric) and linen, and two pairs of sheets with black thread for embroidery, and needles and a mould (cushion) for net-work or lace called "rasour" or "réseau" (réseuil), a bed cover, and dried plums and pears. Servais sent fabric and a dozen hanks of gold and silver thread to Lochleven. Mary's wardrobe goods and tapestry were packed in coffers and taken from Holyroodhouse to Edinburgh Castle.

A part of her request was fulfilled by new purchases made by her half-brother Regent Moray in October. Green and black cloths, black and coloured silk thread, and hanks and silver and gold thread were bought for Servais de Condé to take to Mary. A memorandum written in French survives of textiles and thread sent to Mary at Lochleven, Carlisle, and Bolton Castle. Projects at Lochleven included large quantities of pins, called espingles, and pieces of canvas depicting flowers outlined in black thread. Regent Moray paid Fremyn Alezard for making Mary's shoes in July 1568.

Mary tried to escape disguised in the clothes of her laundress, but was recognised by the boatmen on Loch Leven who returned her to the castle after noticing her hands were "very fair and white". Mary escaped from Lochleven on 2 May 1568, her disguise involved a borrowed red dress and changing her hairstyle so she looked like a local woman. Usually, Mary's hair was elaborately dressed by Mary Seton. A Victorian antiquary, Charles Kirkpatrick Sharpe, claimed to possess the cap she wore during the escape. An Italian account of the escape says that Mary wore the clothes of the elder of her two chamberers or maids, "s'era messe le vesti della maggior di due cameriere".

Three days after her escape, her French cook Estienne Hauet (Stephen Hewat) and his wife Elles Boug packed four silk gowns, two velvet gowns, a chamlet gown, a satin partlet, and other items in a chest to send to the queen wherever she might be. After Langside, John Gordon of Lochinvar gave her clothes. When Mary arrived in England, "her attire was very mean", and she had no change of clothes. She wrote to Elizabeth from Workington on 17 May 1568, saying she had not changed her clothes since her escape, as she had been travelling by night.

== England ==
=== Carlisle Castle and Bolton Castle ===
At Carlisle Castle, Francis Knollys was impressed by the hairdressing skills of Mary Seton, who Mary said was the "finest busker, the finest dresser of a woman's head and hair that is to be seen in any country". Knollys wrote "among other pretty devices, yesterday and this day she did set such a curled hair upon the Queen, that was said to be a periwig that showed very delicately, and every other day lightly ... she hath a new device of head dressing, without any cost, and yet sets forth a woman gaily well". Mary had received clothes "of black colour" by 28 June 1568, and Knollys sent to Edinburgh for more of Mary's clothes, as "she seemeth to esteem not of any apparyll other than hyr owne". Andrew Melville of Garvock came to Carlisle bringing three gowns.

The first consignment of clothes from Lochleven Castle to arrive at Carlisle for Mary in July 1568 proved inadequate, and she complained to Knollys that in three coffers sent by Regent Moray there was only one gown of taffeta, the rest only cloaks, saddle cloths, sleeves, partlets, coifs, and "such like trinketts".

Queen Elizabeth apparently hesitated to send her some of her own clothes, but did send 16 yards of black velvet, 16 yards of black satin and 10 yards of black taffeta, a gift interpreted by the costume historian Janet Arnold as a hint that Mary ought to be in mourning clothes. Mary's secretary Claude Nau mentions the receipt of this gift of textiles at Carlisle, packed in a small box and in shorter lengths than specified in Elizabeth's warrant. The Spanish diplomat, Guzmán de Silva, seems to have reported this particular gift to Phillip II as an unsuitable present for a queen comprising two old chemises, some black velvet, and a pair of shoes and nothing else, according to his letter of 27 June, dos camisas ruines, y dos piezas de terciopelo nigro y dos pares di zapatos y no otra cosa.

Francis Knollys sent Richard Graham alias Garse Ritchie, a servant of Lord Scrope, to bring more of Mary's clothes from Lochleven. He brought five cart loads and four laden horses to Bolton Castle on 20 July 1568. He also brought "an old cloth of estate" which Mary was able to use above her chair in her great chamber. He went back to Scotland, where Regent Moray gave him a reward of 50 French crowns and a parcel of new clothing and costume fabric for his half-sister including; grey and black taffeta, black velvet, thread for stitching, jet buttons, and 12 pairs of leather shoes. Mary wanted Garse Richie to fetch her "jewels", the furs with gold mounts known as zibellini, from John Sempill of Beltrees but Moray would not allow this. Mary received her portable sounding alarm clock or chiming watch from Lochleven, kept in a purse of silver and grey réseau work which she may have made herself. She set up an old cloth of estate from Scotland above her chair in the Great Chamber at Bolton Castle, asserting her royal status.

=== Tutbury Castle ===
A consignment of furnishing was sent to Tutbury Castle for Mary in January 1569 from the English great wardrobe and "removing wardrobe" and from the Tower of London. This included a group of tapestries, verdure tapestry bedcovers, bedding, and chairs and stools covered in crimson cloth of gold and other rich fabrics, and 2000 hooks and two hammers to hang the tapestry. Some hangings were sent to Tutbury from Sheffield by Bess of Hardwick, the Countess of Shrewsbury. Chambers were "hanged" with tapestry for Lady Livingstone and her husband, and for Mary Seton. There was tapestry for three rooms of Mary's apartment, the great bedchamber, her own bedchamber, and the chamber for her grooms. Mary arrived at Tutbury on 4 February 1569 and her French tailor Jacques Senlis and the tapestry worker and embroiderer Florian rejoined her household.

The Earl of Shrewsbury described her at Tutbury in March 1569, working at embroidery and making designs with Bess of Hardwick, Lady Livingstone, and Mary Seton. This was an innocent domestic activity, unlikely to result in conspiracy and sedition: "this Queen continueth daily resort unto my wife's chamber, where with the Lady Leviston and Mistress Seton, she useth to sit working with the needle, in which she much delights, and in devising of works, and her talk is altogether of indifferent trifling matters, without any sign of secret dealing or practice". A visitor, Nicholas White, mentioned embroidery as her indoor pastime in wet weather. The diversity of the coloured silks relieved the tedium of the labour of the stitch. Mary gave a speech comparing carving, painting and needlework.

The surviving results of their collaboration are known as the Oxburgh Hangings. In a letter of 10 September 1570, Mary mentioned that her servant Bastian Pagez devised or "invented" pieces of work, embroidery patterns, to cheer her up. The panels are worked in tent stitch, the petit point embroidery which Mary probably learned in France. A surviving cushion includes a Latin motto Virescit Vulnere Virtus, courage is strengthened by the wound. The motif was linked with a plot for her to escape and marry the Thomas Howard, 4th Duke of Norfolk.

In January 1570, Mary sent clothes from Tutbury to Scotland for James VI with her servants James Lauder and Alexander "Sanders" Bog. The clothes were sent to Annabell Murray, Countess of Mar at Stirling. Mary wanted these to be his first proper clothes since she had given him his first coat, his first "doublet and long hose" provided by his mother. In her letter to the Countess of Mar, Mary said the gift did not include essential buttons, which with the rest of her jewels were kept from her, "whereto there wants such buttons as were worthy to garnish it, thanks to them who withholds from us suchlike and better." The Countess of Mar obtained Mary's buttons for James three years later.

There were rumours that Mary would try to escape from Tutbury in April 1571. One plan was that she should pretend to fall ill while dancing. When she was carried to bed a companion in her clothes would take her place. Mary would escape, dressed as a man, and ride away. Another plan was that she would slip away during a hunt, leaving a companion dressed in her riding clothes. Again, Mary would find an opportunity to change into male clothing and ride away with a messenger. A third plan was for the queen to cut her hair and smear her face with filth, like a "turnbroche", a boy who turned a spit over the kitchen fire. Mary seems not to have attempted escape by such methods.

Mary had clothes sent to her from France. In November 1572 she wrote to the French ambassador Mothe-Fénelon from Sheffield, hoping he could ask her mother-in-law Catherine de' Medici to buy linen for herself and her ladies. A shopping list drawn up in 1572 by her tailor, Jehan de Compiegne, for Jean de Beaucaire, Seigneur de Puiguillon, gives an idea of clothes and textiles obtained from Paris. She may have imported similar goods during her years in Scotland, utilising her French income, although similar goods were available in Edinburgh merchants' booths. The lengths of fabrics were specified for some garments, robes of Florence serge, and doublets of satin lined with taffeta. The order included Milan-style points or fers, and points of jet, an apparently ready-made velvet Spanish-style gown, stockings, shoes, velvet and leather slippers, plain and embroidered handkerchiefs, and other items. The purchases were packed in two coffers or bahuts and shipped in May to the French ambassador Mothe-Fénélon in London to forward to Mary at Sheffield Castle. The clothes had not reached her by 10 June, so Mary wrote to Mothe Fénélon about the missing coffer her tailor had brought to London. Mary seems to have made a similar order in April 1573.

=== Sheffield, French clothes, and a will ===
In January 1576, the French ambassador Michel de Castelnau asked Elizabeth I to allow four trunks of French-made clothes to be delivered to Mary at Sheffield Manor by her tailor's servants. Mary made a will when she was at Sheffield Manor in February 1577. She wanted the executors who would arrange for her funeral to have her large bed of "cramoysi brun" embroidered velvet, her tapestries of the Story of Aeneas and the Story of Meleager, a table nef, and a suite of wall hangings of cloth of gold and violet velvet. She bequeathed an old bed of violet velvet to a French servant Baltassar Hully. Ten years later, the "cramoysi brun" bed was described as "old purple velvet, embroidered with cloth of silver and flowers, with curtains of purple damask, and a covering of serge furred with fox".

While at Sheffield in 1581, Marie Castelnau, the wife of the French ambassador in London, Michel de Castelnau, sent her fabrics for a gown and a "soutane". Her tailor Jehan de Compiegne had died and she wanted to employ Jacques de Senlis (or "de Seulis"), a tailor who had worked for her in Scotland. She asked James Beaton, Archbishop of Glasgow, to buy dress materials in Rouen for her, and forward them to the French ambassador Castelnau. Mary was able to buy silk fabrics for her clothes in France, using 1039 crowns from her French income. A minor earthquake shook Mary's lodging at Sheffield in February 1575 while Mary's gentlewomen were working sitting on boxes and stools.

=== Invisible ink ===
After Castelnau was recalled from London, Mary wrote from Chartley to the new ambassador Guillaume de l'Aubespine de Châteauneuf about maintaining a secret correspondence. She suggested writing sometimes on supplies of white taffeta, or a fine linen called "linomple". The ambassador was to refer to the cloth in his letters, mentioning the length was a number of yards or ells plus one half. This would tell her that the ambassador had written on the cloth with invisible ink made with alum. A letter sent to Mary's secretary Claude Nau by his brother-in-law, Jean Champhuon, sieur du Ruisseau, was intercepted. It included the suspicious phrase "a hundred and a half-hundred of feathers", thought to indicate a secret message.

== Making gifts for Queen Elizabeth ==
Mary hoped to gain Elizabeth's favour by gift giving. Handmade items made personally or within the household could be highly regarded, especially if carefully chosen with insider advice and made from the finest materials. In 1574 Mary embroidered an incarnate or crimson satin skirt with silver thread using materials bought in London by the ambassador, Mothe Fénélon. She had sent him a sample of the silk required. Mary soon wrote for more incarnate silk thread, better quality thinner silver thread, and incarnate taffeta for the lining. Mothe-Fénélon presented the finished item to Elizabeth on 22 May, with a declaration of friendship, and reported to Charles IX of France that the gift was a success.

Presumably hopeful of an audience at the English court, in July 1574, Mary asked the Archbishop of Glasgow, her contact in Paris, to send coifs embroidered with gold and silver and the latest fashion in Italian ribbons and veils for her hair. She hoped that one of the French tailors who had served her in Scotland, Jean de Compiègne, would come to her at Sheffield, bringing patterns and fabric samples as worn at the French court.

Although she had few helpers for delicate work, Mary planned making more gifts for Elizabeth, including a "coiffure with the suite" and some lacework, "ouvrages de réseul". She asked Mothe Fénélon for advice on what Elizabeth would like best, and asked him to send lengths of gold passementerie, braids called "bisette", and silver spangles or oes which she called papillottes. Mary gave Elizabeth an accoustrement de reseul in December 1574, probably a hairnet or snood. Mothe Fénélon refers to "three small night caps of her own handiwork", troys petites coyfures de nuict, ouvrées de sa main.

Elizabeth remained cautious of Mary's gifts, and was reluctant to try some French sweets or sweetmeats which Mothe Fénélon offered her as a gift from the brother of the chancellor of Mary's dowry, for fear of poison. William Cecil had written a memorandum for the safety of Elizabeth, advising caution with gifts of scented clothing and perfumed gloves. A letter from the treasurer Dolu in March 1576 mentions lemons or citrons and dry sugar comfits. Dolu had also bought a chessboard ung damyer and pieces cessetz for Mary.

Elizabeth was pleased with one present received from Mary, and in September 1575 she sent Robert Beale to Mary's keeper, the Earl of Shrewsbury, who mentioned her gracious acceptance, and Beale brought Mary a gift of a jewel depicting the story of Pyramus and Thisbe.

Mary gave Elizabeth a skirt front or devant de cotte in July 1576, made in her household, and followed up with an embroidered casket and a headdress. She wrote that if the skirt pleased Elizabeth she could have others made, even more beautiful. Mary asked Elizabeth if she would send the pattern of the high necked bodice she wore, "un patron d'un de voz corps à haut collet" for her to copy.

The French ambassador's secretary, Monsieur Arnault, Jean Arnault de Cherelles (died 1637), discussed Mary's letters and packages with her gifts for Elizabeth in a letter to Archbishop Beaton in February 1577. He mentioned a "devant de cotte", a skirt front, and a "pourpoint fort bien elabouré", a richly embroidered doublet. Francis Walsingham would inspect the packages before the ambassador gave them to Elizabeth.

Mary embroidered a vest for James VI in 1579, but when her secretary Claude Nau came Scotland in June he was not permitted to deliver her gift. Mary provided clothes for some of the women in her household. When she was at Worksop Manor in September 1583, she wrote to "Bess Pierpont", who was at home with her family. Mary was having a black gown made for her and had ordered her a "garniture" to wear with it, either of wire-work and jewellery or a woven trimming, from London.

In 1584, Mary asked the French ambassador in London, Michel de Castelnau to take special care of her secret correspondence and pay the couriers well. He should pretend the money was for gold and silver embroidery thread he sent to her. His wife, Marie, sent her coifs to wear on her head in March 1585.

=== A gown for Lady Cobham ===
Mary found an ally in Anne Howard, Countess of Arundel. She had family connections in the north of England and could help get Mary's letters delivered in Scotland. In 1585, Mary wanted write to Frances, Lady Cobham and make her a gift of silk and velvet for a gown. Mary hoped the Countess of Arundel would buy the fabrics and give them to Cobham if this was appropriate. The French ambassador Castelnau would reimburse the Countess of Arundel.

== Clothes remaining in Edinburgh Castle, 1578 ==
While Mary was England, and her son James VI was growing up at Stirling Castle, a substantial remainder of Mary's wardrobe and the furnishings of her palaces were locked up in Edinburgh Castle. An inventory was made in March 1578, written in the Scots Language, including her "gownes, vaskenis, skirtis, slevis, doublettis, vaillis, vardingallis, cloikis". The inventory exists in two copies, one in the National Archives of Scotland and another in the British Library. The taking of this inventory was described in the chronicle attributed to David Moysie.

Among the hundreds of items; "a Highland kirtle of black stemming embroidered with blue silk" was related to the black gown found in Mary's chest at Fawside, and a pair of white canvas shepherd's kirtles were remnants from a masque performed at Castle Campbell in 1563 at the wedding of Lord Doune. There were items of costume from court revelries and masques including feathers, golden shields, headdresses of silver, and "Egyptian" hats made of red and yellow fabrics. Accessories included; "huidis, quaiffis, collaris, rabattis, orilyeitis (fronts of hoods), napkins, caming cloths, covers of night gear, hose, shoes, and gloves". At least 36 pairs of her velvet shoes remained in Edinburgh Castle "of sundry colours passmented with gold and silver stored in Edinburgh Castle. These had probably been made for her by Fremyn Alezard.

There were sixty pieces of canvas marked up for embroidery, including a canvas bed valance, "drawin upoun paper and begun to sew", with nine pieces of sewing canvas, some drawn and some undrawn. Some pieces of half finished embroidery included the arms of House of Longueville, and had belonged to Mary of Guise, whose first husband was the Duke of Longueville.

=== Dolls and Mary's cabinet ===
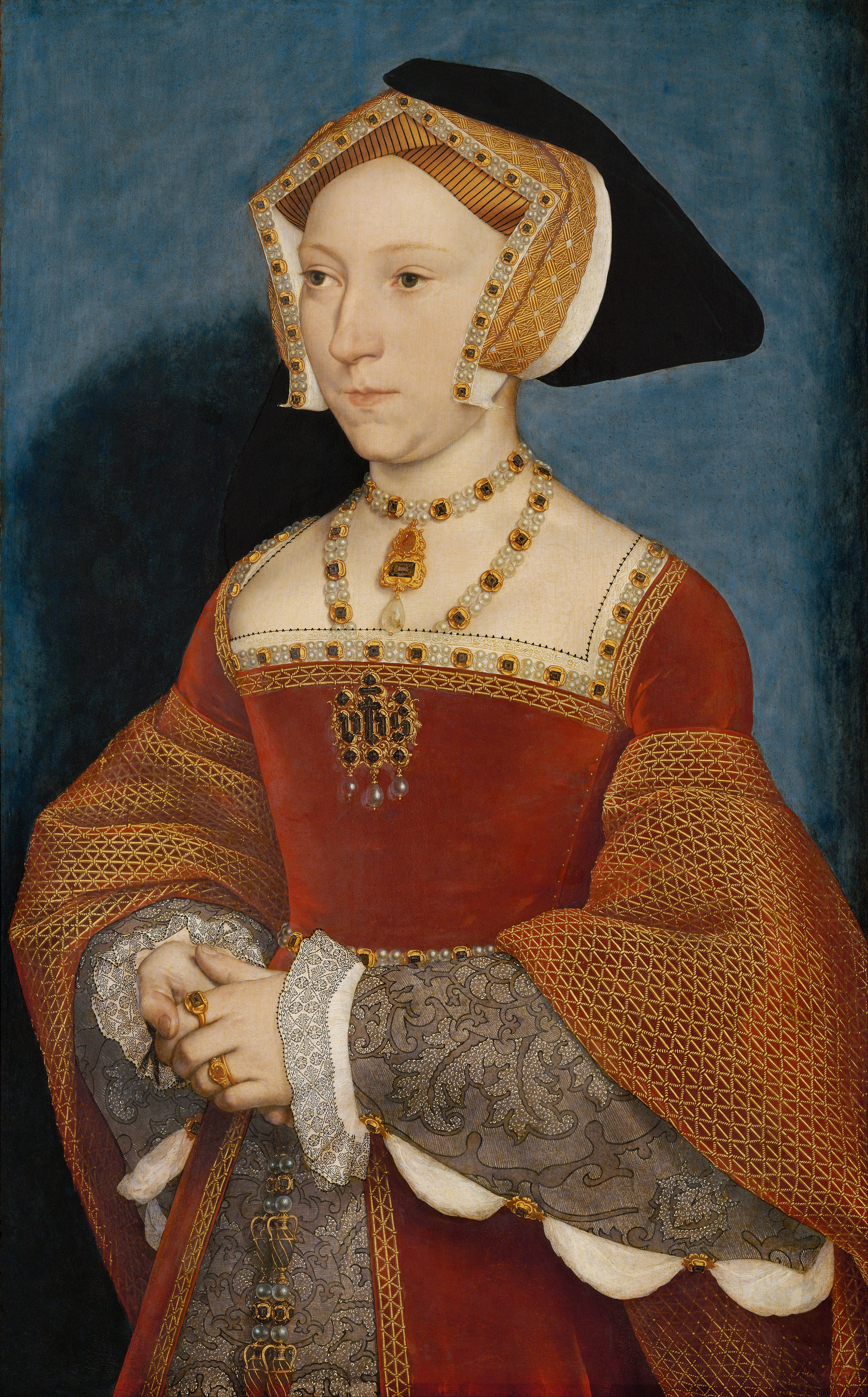
Jane Seymour owned dolls with miniature accessories

In one coffer stored in Edinburgh Castle there was a set of dolls called "pippens" with their miniature wardrobe of farthingales, sleeves, and slippers. The dolls may have been intended for play, or used as fashion dolls disseminating patterns for creating new outfits for Mary and her ladies in waiting.

Some renaissance dolls seem to have been destined for play. In 1571, Mary's former companion in France, Claude of Valois, Duchess of Lorraine, asked her goldsmith Pierre Hotman to send her some dolls "as well-clothed as he could find" in 1571, with a set of miniature silver plates for a buffet made in Paris, intended as a present for Christine, the new-born daughter of Renata of Lorraine, Duchess of Bavaria. Jeanne d'Albret also bought dolls in 1571.

Jane Seymour, third wife of Henry VIII, owned great and little "babies" dressed in gowns of cloth of silver, satin, and velvet tied with gold "aglettes", like her own sleeves. In a treatise on collecting printed in 1565, Samuel Quiccheberg noted that princesses and queens sent each other dolls with details of foreign clothing. Mary's tailor Jacques de Senlis updated the dolls' costumes with grey damask and silver cloth in September 1563.

Mary's dolls are listed in the inventory with miscellaneous items which appear to be a remainder of her cabinet of curiosities in Scotland. A cabinet room at Holyrood Palace had been fashioned for Mary by her valet Servais de Condé in September 1561, the walls lined with fabic called "Paris green". The work was financed with a loan from the banker and textile merchant Timothy Cagnioli.

=== Maundy in England ===
The Scottish monarchs celebrated Maundy by giving gifts to poor people. The number of recipients usually reflected their age. When Mary intended to give clothes in 1585/6, her secretary Gilbert Curle discussed her requirements with Amias Paulet. She needed more woollen cloth and linen than the usual merchant in Stafford could supply. In 1584/5, fabric had been given to 42 young maidens (she was 42) and to 18 young boys (James VI was 18), and £18 would be given to older people in Tutbury. The provision of cloth for the Maundy 1585/6 caused some misunderstandings. Some of the cloth was in left in the possession of Mary's tailor Robert Moreton after her death.

=== Elizabeth Stewart, Countess of Arran ===
In 1584, James Stewart, Earl of Arran gained political power in Scotland, and his wife Elizabeth Stewart, Countess of Arran became an influential and controversial figure. An English diplomat, William Davison, reported that she had obtained new keys to Mary's jewel chests, and the official keeper of the keys, Robert Melville, would resign his responsibilities. Davison heard that the Countess of Arran had surveyed the remaining royal wardrobe, and "tried what garments, and that were the Queen's, may best fit her, and choose out, at her own discretion, what she liketh". Davison thought that these actions of Arran and his wife in August 1584 would soon provoke a reaction against them.

== The 1586 inventories ==
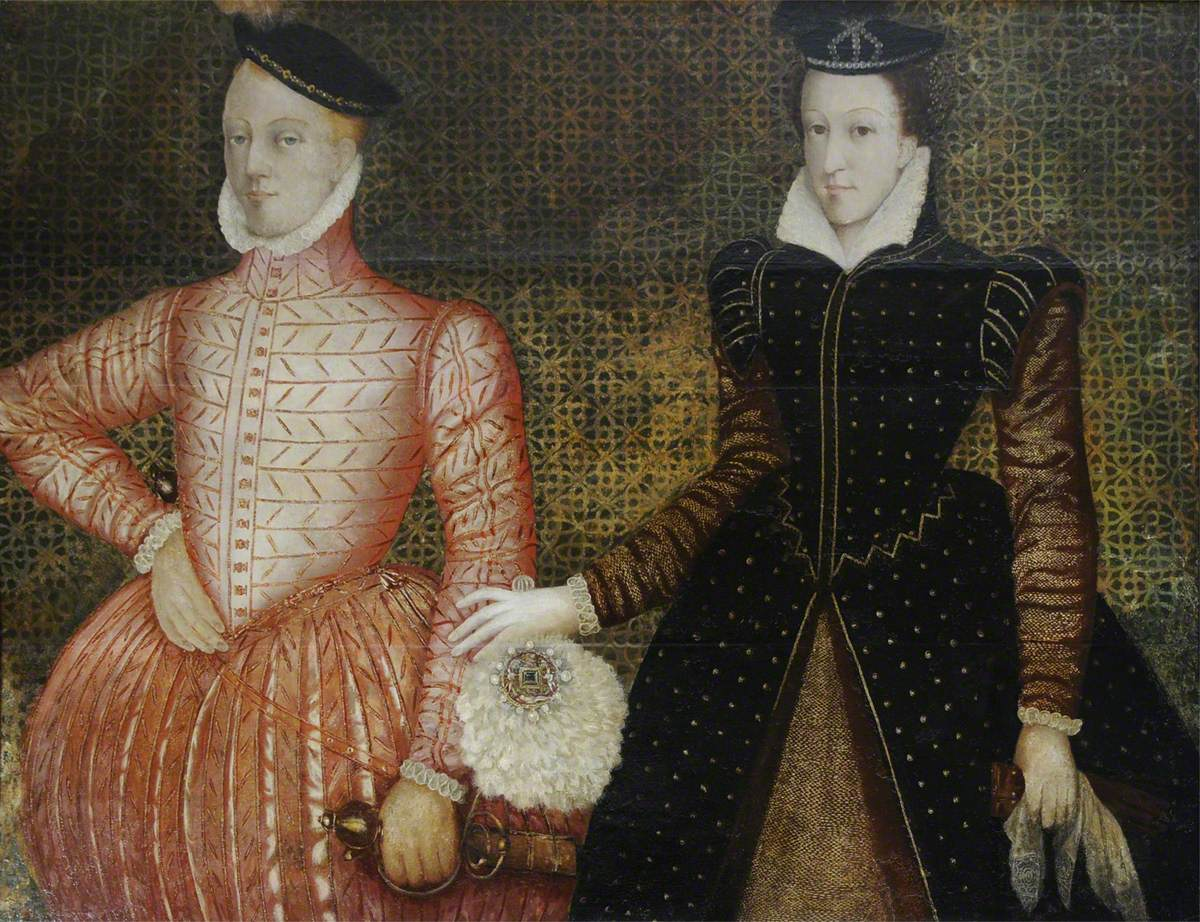
Mary in black velvet embroidered with pearls, with matching sleeves and vasquine skirt over a French farthingale, with Lord Darnley, Hardwick Hall

An inventory of Mary's wardrobe was made at Chartley Castle on 13 June 1586, written in French. The main headings are:

- Gowns or robes, including;
  - A black velvet gown with a tail, embroidered with pearls, lined with black taffeta, with pearl buttons on the front and on the sleeves
  - Another gown of crêpe, embroidered with jet, the bodice lined with white satin
  - Another gown of black satin, lined with black taffeta, two velvets passements at the front
- Skirts or vasquines
  - Another skirt of black taffeta, banded, lined with taffeta
  - Another of black satin, lined with black taffeta, with two bands of velvet passementerie at the front
  - Another of white satin, lined with white buckram, banded with beads of jet
- Doublets called pourpoincts
  - Another of white satin, with taffeta cordons on the sleeves
- Doublets called juppes
  - A jupe of "cramoisy brun" velvet with bands of black passementerie, lined with "brune" taffetta. This garment accords with a description of Mary's costume on the day of her execution given by Adam Blackwood, and the "iuppe de velours cramoisy brun" mentioned in La Mort de la Royne D'Escosse (1588).
  - A jupe of crimson figured satin, with four bands of blue silk and silver passementerie, with fringes of the same, lined with white taffeta
- Cloaks or manteaux
- Tapestries and cloths of estate
  - A dais or cloth of estate of violet silk, embroidered with the arms of Scotland and Lorraine.
  - Another cloth of estate of "cramoisy" brown velvet, barred with silver passementerie.
- Other items in the wardrobe coffers
  - The bodice of a velvet gown with a high collar, with sleeves embroidered with passementerie and jet
  - A garniture or ornament for a gown with bands of pearls on black velvet

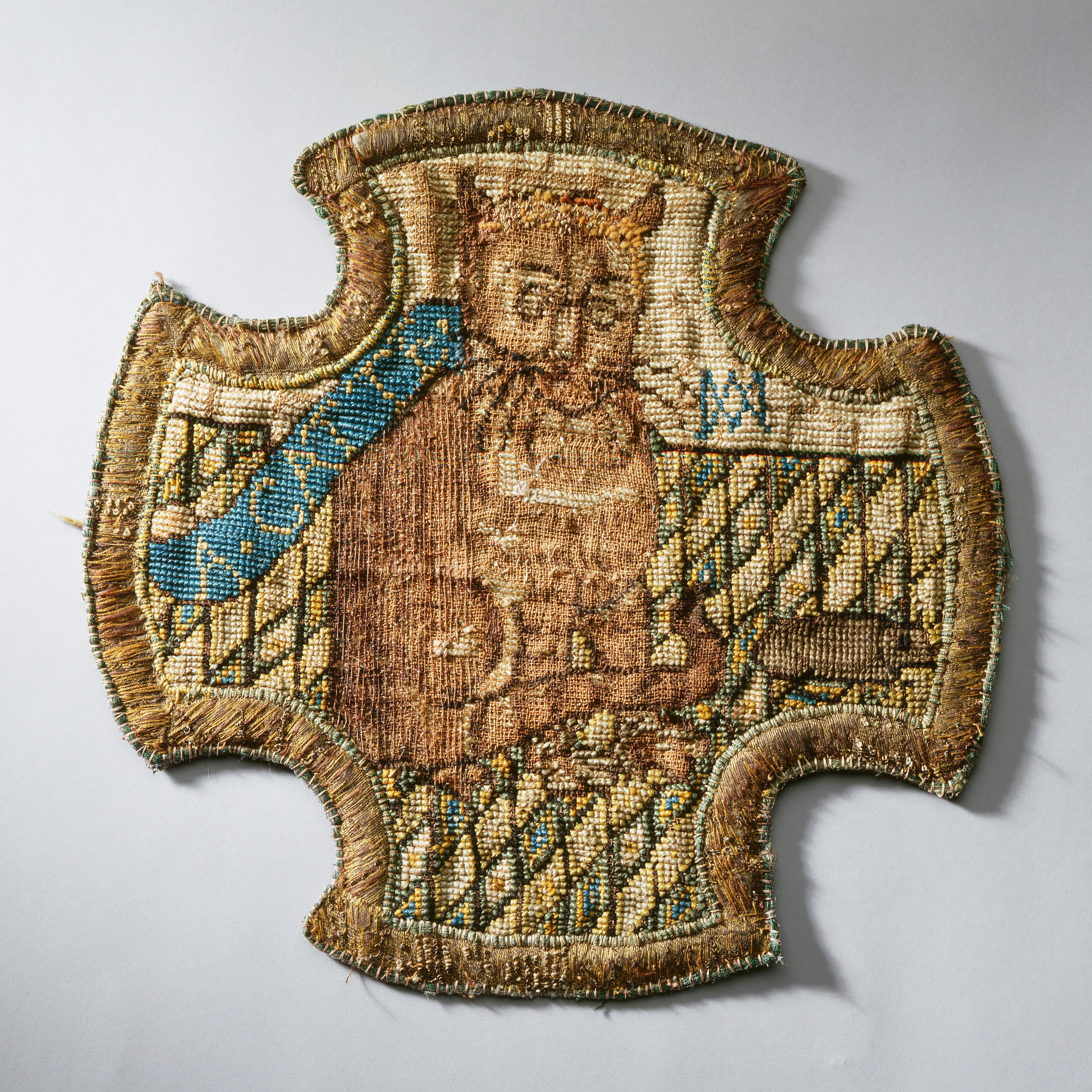
Mary, Queen of Scots, embroidered a picture of a cat, Royal Collection

=== Embroidery and pictorial sources ===
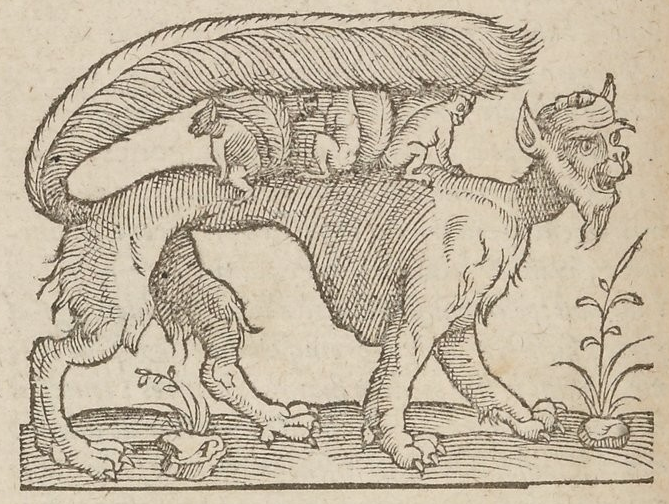
Mary embroidered one of the Oxburgh panels with an image of the "Su", an animal from Patagonia illustrated by André Thevet.

A further inventory was made at Chartley on 18 May of needlework in the keeping of Renée Rallay alias Mademoiselle de Beauregard. This includes 102 flowers worked in petit-point, 124 birds, and another 116 birds cut-out, 16 four-footed beasts including a lion attacking a wild boar, 52 fish, and other works of embroidery intended for a bed and a cloth of estate. Another paper (in two parts) in French describes the devices on Mary's bed, the embroidered emblems with Latin mottoes.

Embroidery was a lifelong hobby and passion for Mary. She embroidered a pair of cushions as gifts for the Cardinal of Lorraine in 1574. One of her French administrators, Gilles, Seigneur du Verger, sent her a range of coloured silk thread in 1577, which she called "soyes de nuances pour mes ouvrages.

Mary used designs from emblem books and illustrations from the natural history works of Conrad Gesner. A ginger "catte" based on a woodcut of Gesner's may have been intended to represent Elizabeth I. Other sources for animals incorporated for motifs worked by Mary include the publications of Pietro Andrea Mattioli and Pierre Belon. Her "bird of America", the toucan, was based on an illustration by André Thevet, and she also copied his "Su". Thevet had a number of connections to Mary, and the Guise and French royal family, and had sailed to Brazil in the fleet of Nicolas Durand de Villegaignon, who captained Mary's two voyages between France and Scotland.

=== Treason as a cushion ===
A design with the Latin motto Virescit Vulnere Virtus (virtue grows strong by wounding) seems to signal her will and ambition to survive her rival. Made up a cushion cover as a gift to the Duke of Norfolk, the design featured a hand descending from heaven with a pruning hook, as if to clear away old growth for new shoots. This was interpreted as referring to Elizabeth as barren stock and the continuance of the English crown through the descent of Mary.

=== Inventories made in August 1586 and February 1587 ===
In August 1586, possibly while Mary was taken to Tixall, an inventory was made of her jewels and silver plate in the keeping of Jean Kennedy. Some fabrics were in the keeping of Elizabeth Curle. There is also a short list of items stolen from Mary in 1586. The circumstances are unclear. The list includes a gold pincase to wear on a girdle, enamelled white and red, doublets of russet satin and canvas, a black velvet cap with a green and black feather, and three embroidered mufflers or scarves of which two were black velvet. Three "carcanet chains" or necklaces were embroidered with gold and silver.

The August 1586 inventory includes some linen and canvas for embroidery, and a bed of work of "rezel", le lict d'ouvraige de rezel. The "rezel" was probably the same "reseau" network that Mary had crafted at Lochleven. The bed curtains were described again in English as "furniture for a bedd, of network and holland intermixed, not half finished". By this time, Charles Plouvart was employed as her embroiderer, a replacement for Pierre Oudry. Pierre Oudry was a valued servant and held the office of clerk of the customs of Edinburgh, forfeited by Patrick Bellenden of Stenhouse. Oudry had served Mary at Sheffield, with his wife, sister-in-law and five children. His wife became mentally ill and was kept at Tutbury while Mary was at Chartley. Later collectors and historians thought Oudry was a painter, and his name "P. Oudry Pinxit" was added Mary's portraits.

After Mary's execution in February 1587 a list of her belongings, jewellery and apparell, in the possession of various members of her household was made. Jean Kennedy, Renée Rallay, Gillis Mowbray, and Mary Pagez, the daughter of Bastian Pagez, each held several items from the queen's wardrobe. Renée Rallay had the queen's embroidery silks. Some pieces, including the black velvet gown set with pearls were said to have been earmarked by Mary to be sold by her Master of Household, Andrew Melville of Garvock, to cover the expenses of the return of servants to Scotland.

=== The emblematic bed at Holyrood Palace in 1603 ===
Some of Mary's things were sent to Scotland, and in April 1603, the secretary of Anne of Denmark, William Fowler noted or obtained a list of some of the emblems or devices embroidered on the curtains of Mary's bed at Holyrood Palace. Fowler's nephew William Drummond of Hawthornden sent a version of the list to Ben Jonson in 1619. The embroideries included a panel with a Latin motto Unus Non Sufficit Orbis, or "One world is not enough". A picture of two loadstone magnets was captioned with an embroidered anagram of "Marie Steuart" in French as Sa Verteu M'attire, meaning "its virtue attracts me". This anagram had been used by Mary as a signature to a poem in 1574.

== Mary's execution ==
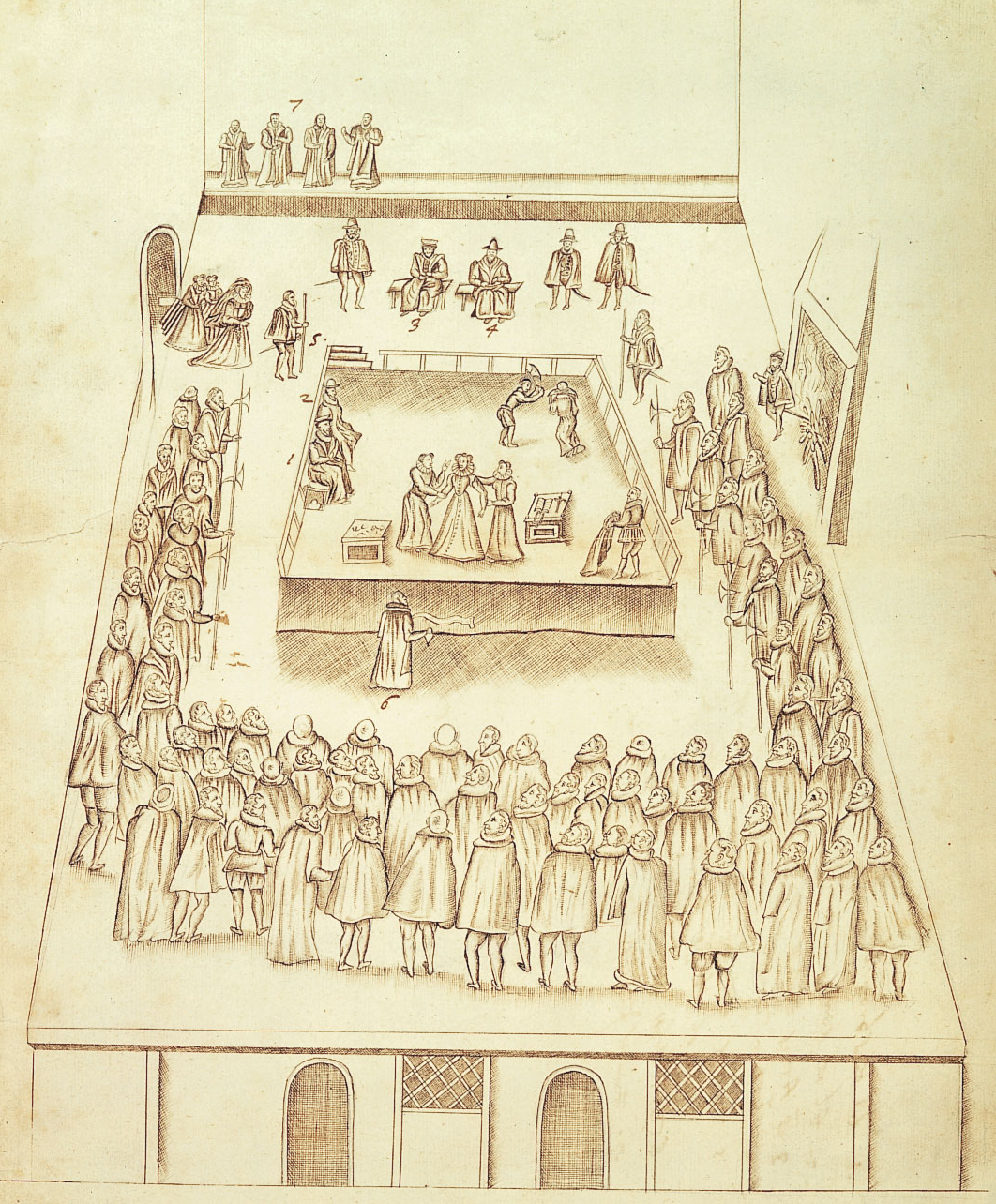
Several contemporary narrative accounts describe Mary's clothes and disrobing at her execution at Fotheringhay Castle.

During the investigations into the Babington Plot, the code breaker Thomas Phelippes interviewed Mary's two secretaries, Gilbert Curle and Claude Nau, and Jérôme Pasquier, groom of the chamber and master of Mary's wardrobe, in the Tower of London. Pasquier's role included buying cloth in London for the livery clothes of the household. He confessed to writing and deciphering coded letters for Mary, and had written a letter asking the French ambassador to seek a pardon for the plotter Francis Throckmorton.

Adam Blackwood wrote an account of the execution and her clothing. He said that Mary's veil, which reached the ground, was one usually worn on solemn occasions, or for important audiences. An English account mentions she was attired "in a gowne of black sattyn embroydered with a French kind of embroydery of black velvett, her hair seemly trussed up with a vayle of white laund, which covered her head and all her other apparel down to the foote".

A narrative of Mary's execution by "R. W.", Robert Wingfield, mentions her costume as she left her bedchamber; "her borrowed hair" a wig, and on her head she had a dressing of lawn edged with bone lace, a pomander chain and an "Agnus Dei" about her neck, a Crucifix in her hand, a pair of beads (a rosary) at her girdle, with a golden cross at the end of them. She had a veil of lawn fastened to her caul bowed out with wire, and edged round about with bone lace. Her gown was of black satin painted, with a train and long sleeves to the ground, with acorn-shaped buttons of jet and pearl. She had short or half sleeves of black satin, over a pair of sleeves of purple velvet. Her kirtle was of figured black satin, her petticoat upperbody unlaced in the back of crimson satin, and her petticoat skirt of crimson velvet, her shoes of Spanish leather with the rough side outward, a pair of green silk garters, her nether stockings of worsted were coloured watchet (sky blue), clocked with silver, and edged on the tops with silver, and next by her leg, a pair of white Jersey hose. An anonymous history of Mary calls her costume "matronlike and very modest".

The two executioners disrobed her, with her two women (Jean Kennedy and Elizabeth Curle) helping, and then she laid the crucifix upon a stool. One of the executioners took the Agnus Dei from her neck, and she laid hold of it, saying she would give it to one of her women. Then they took off her chain of pomander beads and all her other apparel. She put on a pair of sleeves with her own hands. At length, she was unattired and unapparelled to her petticoat and kirtle. Anything touched by the queen's blood was burnt in hall's chimney fire.

A version of the execution narrative written in the Scots Language mentions the burning of the executioners' clothes or anything touched by her blood; "all thingis about hir, belonging to hir, war takin from the executionaris and nocht sufferet so mutche to have ther aprones befor they war weshed, the blodie clothes, the blok, and quhatsumever [whatsoever] ellis war burnt in the chalmer". English and French narratives mentions that one the executioners found a little dog under her clothes while untying her garters.

Mary mentioned in a letter to the Bishop of Glasgow on 6 November 1577 that she had been sent "chaplets" or rosaries, and an "Agnus Dei" from Rome. These may be the items mentioned in the narrative of the execution.

=== Red clothing on the scaffold ===
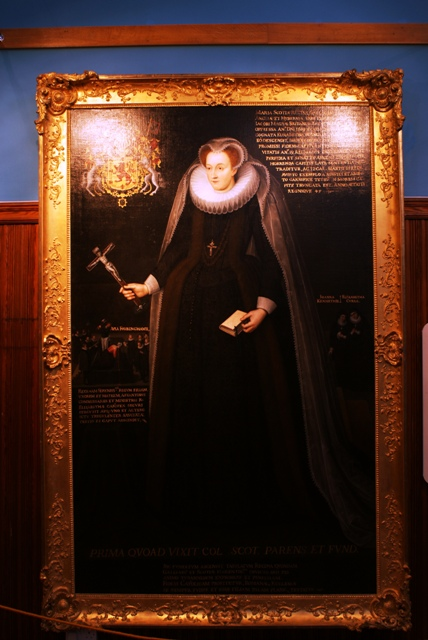
Mary wears red in a vignette in a portrait at Blairs College

A French account of the execution mentions her cotillon (petticoat) of red velvet, with corps (bodice) of red satin, and a paire des manches (doublet) of red satin, "thus she was executed all in red". The Blairs College portrait of Mary has a vignette of the execution showing her upper half in red. Recent writers suppose that Mary wore red to suggest an affiliation to martyrdom, since the colour may represent martyrdom.

Some contemporary accounts of the execution do not mention red clothes. A Catholic writer mentions that she wore a gown of black satin with French-style embroidery of black velvet. A gown of this description was listed at Chartley and after the execution. This writer does not mention the disrobing or any red clothes. Mary's physician Dominique Bourgoing mentions that her two women Jean Kennedy and Elizabeth Curle took off Mary's veil, her mantle with a train and her doublet, "voylle, son manteau à queue et son pourpoinct".

A 19th-century historian James Anthony Froude conjectured that the "blood-red" costume, the crimson petticoat and kirtle, mentioned by Wingfield and others, was extraordinary and deliberate or "carefully studied". Froude's suggestions were challenged by John Morris, who argued that the "rouge" or "blood-red" costume was an item mentioned by Adam Blackwood, a velvet "juppe" identifiable with a "pourpoinct" in the June 1586 inventory and described as "cramoisy brun", a dark red brown. Red petticoats were not uncommon in Elizabethan England, and physicians such as Andrew Boorde thought that red clothes promoted health benefits.

A glove at Saffron Walden Museum is said to have been her gift to Marmaduke Darrell at Fotheringhay. He was an English administrator of her household. The leather glove is embroidered with coloured silks and silver thread, and lined with crimson satin.

=== Mourning in Edinburgh ===
The French ambassador in Edinburgh, Monsieur de Courcelles, bought black fabric from Henry Nisbet for mourning clothes for himself and his household including bombazine for doublets, and dyed Beauvais serge for his men, "sairg de Beauvois tainct en soye pour habiller votre gens en dueil".

Courcelles wrote that there was some debate whether James VI should wear mourning, and what kind of signal this might be as a response to Elizabeth's actions. Courcelles says James wore black.

== See also ==
- Jewels of Mary, Queen of Scots
- Scottish Royal tapestry collection
