= Henry Blackwood (physician) =

Scottish physician

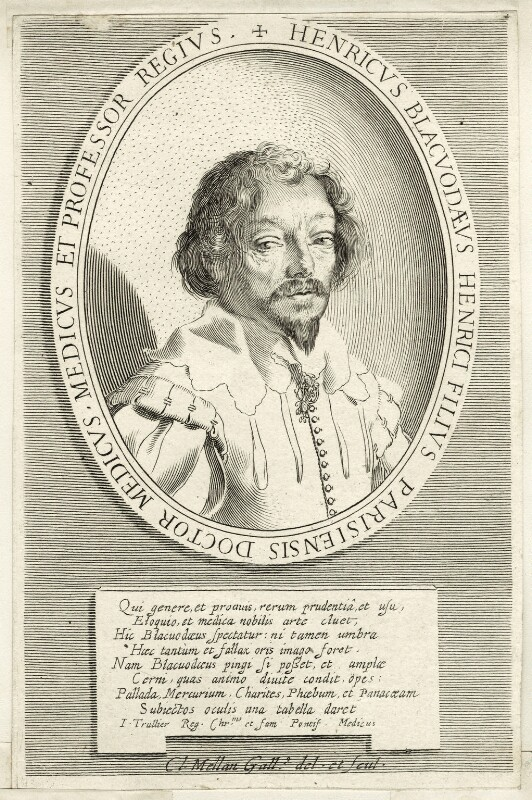
- Died: 1614
- Occupation: Physician

Henry Blackwood (died 1614) was a Scottish physician.

== Biography ==
Blackwood was descended from a family of good position in Fifeshire, and was a brother of Adam Blackwood, judge of the parliament of Poitiers. He was born at Dunfermline, and after studying belles lettres and philosophy was sent by his uncle, Robert Reid, bishop of Orkney, to the university of Paris, where he taught philosophy about the year 1561. Having afterwards studied medicine he graduated M.D., was incorporated a member of the College of Physicians of Paris, and ultimately became dean of the faculty, He died in 1614. He edited 'In Organum Aristotelis Commentaria,' 'Collatio Philosophiæ atque Medicinæ,' and 'De Claris Medicis;' and left in manuscript 'Animadversio in omnes Galeni libros,' 'Hippocratis quædam cum MSS. collate,' 'In Alexandrum Trallianum Comment.,' and 'Locorum quorumdam Plinii explicatio.' Mackenzie also attributes to him 'Hippocratis Coi Prognosticorum libri tres, cum Latina interpretatione, ad veterum exemplarium fidem emendati et recogniti,' Paris, 1625, but the work was really edited by his son Henry, who was also a professor of medicine and surgery at Paris, and who died at Rouen, 17 October 1634. George Blackwood, a brother of the father, taught philosophy at Paris about the year 1571, but subsequently took holy orders, and obtained considerable preferment in the French Church.
