= Porcher =

Porcher is a French language word meaning "swineherd" (from Old French porc), from which a metonymic surname is derived. Variants of the surname include Le Porcher, Porchier, Porquier, Porquiez, Pourcher, Pourchaire, Porchet, Porchel, Porchat and Pourchet; and also diminutive forms Porcheray, Porcheret, Porcherot and Porcherel.

== People with the name ==
- Frances Porcher (1853–1935), American writer and journalist
- Francis Peyre Porcher, A medical figure from the American Civil War
- Frederick Adolphus Porcher (1809–1888), American politician and educator
- Friedrich Joseph Porcher (1814–1877), German sculptor and painter
- Georg Porcher (1860–1936), Prussian district administrator
- George Du Pré Porcher (c. 1823–1876), English cricketer and barrister
- Gilles Porcher de Lissonay (1753–1824), count of Richebourg, French physician and politician
- Jean Porcher (1892-1966), French historian
- Jocelyne Porcher (born 1956), French sociologist and zootechnician
- Josias Porcher (c. 1761–1820), English politician
- Louis Porcher (1940–2014), French sociologist
- Marcel Porcher (born 1947), French lawyer and politician
- Marion Porcher (born 1992), French cyclist
- Mazÿck Porcher Ravenel (1862–1946), American physician and professor
- Nikki Porcher, American politician
- Robert Porcher (born 1969), American football defensive end
- Robert John Porcher Broughton (1816–1911), English amateur cricketer
- Thomas Porcher (born 1977), French economist
- Thomas Porcher Stoney (1889–1973), American politician
- William Porcher Miles (1822–1899), American politician
- William Porcher DuBose (1836–1918), American priest and theologian

== See also ==
- Porcarius
