= Adam Blackwood =

Adam Blackwood may refer to:

- Adam Blackwood (writer) (1539–1613), Scottish author and apologist for Mary, Queen of Scots
- Adam Blackwood (actor) (born 1959), English actor
