= Porcarius =

Porcarius (French: Porcaire or Porchaire) is the Latin word for "swineherd" and was occasionally used as a masculine given name in the early Middle Ages. Since porcarii were often slaves, "only elite couples [named their children Porcarius], and they probably did it ironically." In the 7th-century hagiography Martyrium Prisci et sociorum, for example, the aristocratic landowner Porcarius is introduced while boar hunting. The Spanish name Suarius may have a similar origin.

Known bearers of the name include;

- Porcarius I (fl. c. 490), abbot of Lérins
- Porcarius of Poitiers (d. c. 600), abbot of Saint-Hilaire-le-Grand
- Porcarius II (d. c. 732), abbot of Lérins, martyr
- Porcarius (fl. 1150), brother of Peter Abelard and monk of Buzay Abbey

== See also ==
- Porcher, French surname
- Porcaro
