= Nichola (fool) =

Jester to Mary, Queen of Scots

Nichola or Nicolle (fl. 1560–1570) was a fool or jester to Mary, Queen of Scots.

== Jester of Mary ==
Nichola was a French "fool" or servant entertainer of Mary, Queen of Scots. She seems to have arrived in Scotland with Mary in 1561. After Mary's abdication she remained at the Scottish court of Mary's half-brother Regent Moray. She was also known as "La Jardinière", the gardener or flower-vase.

One of her keepers or governors was a French courtier called Jacqueline Cristoflat. The household rolls suggest that "Christofflette" was previously the attendant serving the maids of honour, the "femme de chambre des filles". Other fools at court included Conny, Jane Colquhoun, Janet Musche, Foysir (a man), George Stevin, and James Geddie. Nothing is known of Nichola's court role or her performances, except the costumes that were given to her, recorded in the accounts of the royal wardrobe. The historian John Guy imagines that the queen "loved to banter" with Nichola "to indulge her wicked sense of humour."

A costume for a fool was delivered to "Johnne Dusow, Frenchman", the fool's keeper in November 1561, consisting of 10 ells of grey cloth dressed with an ell of green. Another costume provided for one of the fools in February 1563 consisted of 8.75 ells of green "kendely" cloth, 60 ells of red and yellow passments (or Passementerie) made of worsted wool, and an ell of linen. The red and yellow may have referenced the Stewart heraldry.

A blue velvet bonnet was made for her in December 1563. As three large blue velvet Swiss bonnets were made at the same time for court masque costume, it seems likely that Nichola performed in the masque. In February 1564 the queen's tailor Jehan de Conpiegne made her a gown from yellow and violet "treilly" fabric, with passments. In March 1567 she was given 30 shillings worth of linen for shirts and other items.

In October 1565, Nichola had a new bed hung with green plaiding. Mary gave her one of her old white gowns. In 1564, she was given a blue velvet bonnet, linen, and Jacqueline was given canvas to make her six smocks or chemises and coifs. Servais de Condé recorded that one of Mary's bedsheets was cut up to make handkerchiefs for her. "Nicola the fuille" was given 30 ells of linen for "sarks", shirts, and other uses in March 1567.

After Mary was imprisoned at Lochleven Castle and forced to abdicate, some of her servants either joined the household of her half-brother or received maintenance from him. In January 1568, Regent Moray gave her forty shillings and in February gave her and her keeper £20 and 18 shillings. In May 1569, he gave Nichola twenty shillings and black cloth for a gown. In December 1569, he paid for a costume for Nichola, including a grey gown with white, red, and yellow fabric, and grey hose. At the same time, he paid £67 Scots for Nichola's and her keepers' expenses from February 1567 to 26 December 1569. Moray also bought clothes for Nageir, Mary's African servant, who was known as a "Moor" or "Moir" and possibly attended her horse with her lackeys.

Nageir may have been the "Moor" mentioned in the expenses of the funeral of Regent Moray, who was bought clothes when he left Scotland for France in April 1570. Nichola was given two gowns with hoods in February 1570. In August 1570, Regent Lennox gave Nichola £15 to travel to France.

== Identity ==
There are records of a fool called "La Jardinière" and the "fool of flowers" serving Catherine de' Medici in France from 1556 who was perhaps the same woman. Her keeper in July 1560 was Charlotte Mariel or Marielle. She was bought double-soled slippers and a gown with a tail of white miniver fur. An earlier note of payments to women in the household of Mary's mother Mary of Guise, dating from the years before she assumed the Regency of Scotland in 1554, includes money paid to a "Jardinnier" to go to France. In Scotland, linen was given to the governess of the fool known as "la Jardiniere" to make three "paires de callesons" and some "mouchoirs" in October 1561. These are thought to be kerchiefs and stockings or linen drawers for Nichola.

It has been suggested there were two French court entertainers both known as "La Jardinière", and that "Jardinière" was a surname shared by Nichola and another fool, Catherine.

=== Other servants called Nichola and Nicholas ===
A number of servants in the royal household were called Nicola or Nicolas, possibly causing confusion. One of Mary's ladies in waiting was Nichola(s) Wardlaw, a daughter of Henry Wardlaw of Torrie, Nicola or Nicole Carbonier (died 1578) was a male tapestry worker, embroiderer, and burgess of Edinburgh, who had worked for Mary of Guise. Nicholas Guillebault was the upholsterer or menusier, Nicholas Villais was a lackey, Nicholas Dawalyeir was lackey to the French maidens, and Nicholace de Cois was a male servant in the pantry. A cook Nicolas (Boindreid), and a male royal servant "Nycola" are mentioned in the minutes of the Canongate Kirk Session, and Captain Belloc of the royal archers baptised his child as Nycola in the chapel of Holyroodhouse.

== Fiction ==
The details of Nichola's life have suggested the theme of a novel for young adults, Queen's Own Fool: A Novel of Mary Queen of Scots (Penguin, 2000), by Jane Yolen and Robert J. Harris.

== Context ==
Other fools in the record of the Scottish court include Robesoun, who worked for Regent Arran from 1546. From around 1600, Anne of Denmark was entertained by Tom Durie.
