= Jane Colquhoun =

Jane Colquhoun (fl. 1566-1567) was a Scottish fool at the court of Mary, Queen of Scots.

Other fools or jesters at the Scottish court included French Nicola. The roles of these entertainers are mostly known from the records of clothes bought for them.

In October 1566, when the court was at Stirling Castle, Mary ordered a new costume for Jane Colquhoun. Red and yellow cloth was bought for her gown, coat, and hose (stockings). Red and yellow were the heraldic colours of the House of Stewart. The costume might have been made parti-coloured.

In April 1567 French black cloth was bought for "Jonet Colquhoun".
