= Nageir the Moor =

Servant of African origin at the Scottish royal court

Nageir the Moor was a servant of African origin at the Scottish royal court. The word "moor" was used to denote people of African origin in 16th-century Scotland.

== Records of Nageir the Moor ==
In February 1568, James Stewart, 1st Earl of Moray, the half-brother of Mary, Queen of Scots, and ruler of Scotland as Regent, ordered clothes for Nagier. This was shortly after Moray's return from England, where he had presented papers incriminating his sister at York and Westminster. The tailor John Murdoch made cloaks called "mandells" and breiks from yellow stemming cloth for four lackeys and for the "moir", meaning Nageir. The cloak had velvet at the neck.

Similarly, in 1590, Anne of Denmark ordered clothes for her unnamed African servant and pages, and he ate with her lackeys, servants connected with riding and the stable. Nagier, dressed in costume like the other lackeys, was a riding companion for Moray and his wife Agnes Keith. In December 1569, John Murdoch made a coat and hose for "Nageir the More" from fine violet stemming, with a canvas doublet and a hat.

Nageir may have previously worked for Mary, Queen of Scots. In 1568 and 1569 Regent Moray bought clothes for some of her former servants, including James Geddie and Nichola her entertainers or fools. His name does not appear among those of 12 of her pages and lackeys in March 1567. Possibly, Nagier arrived in Scotland with Moray on 9 August 1567, when he returned from France. In Dieppe, waiting for his ship and a favourable wind, Moray lodged with William Aikman alias Guillaume Acquemen, a prominent Scottish merchant. Aikman came to Scotland with Moray, returning to Dieppe in October 1567 with Moray's passport and the Laird of Haltoun. At this time there were African people in Dieppe, brought by Spanish ships. One man, known as "Poix blanc", an expert swordsman involved in a Huguenot rebellion, was hanged by the Catholic authorities.

Nagier was employed at the Scottish court until Regent Moray was assassinated while riding through Linlithgow on 23 January 1570. An account of the expenses of Moray's funeral and burial includes further details about Nageir. From the 27 January to 26 April 1570, he and another former servant, Pier Antweyne, were lodged in John McCullough's house in Edinburgh. Nageir was bought a cloak-coat and "gargasis" of French russet, and another canvas doublet. Moray's former secretary, John Wood, looked after them and arranged their transport, sending updates to the Countess. With new hats and three new pairs of shoes, Nageir and Pier took ship from Leith to Dieppe. At Dieppe they were given 40 Francs. Nothing else is known about them.
