= George Critton =

Scottish French jurist

George Crichton or Critton (c.1555 - 8 April 1611) was a Scottish lawyer and hellenist active in France, serving as a professor in its Collège royal.

Several of his written works survive, including verses and discourses in Latin. One of them is a funerary elogy for Ronsard, presented at the collège de Boncourt in 1586.

== Life ==
He moved to Paris early in life and there studied the humanities. Next he studied and taught law at the University of Toulouse before returning to Paris in 1582 "with the design of seeing its beauties at more leisure, which he had previously seen inattentively, and of [then] returning to his homeland". There he joined the French bar to perfect his legal studies and to practise. However, his friends dissuaded him from this path since - as a foreigner - he would have little chance of finding work in Paris and his return to Scotland as a Catholic would put him at risk due to the Scottish Reformation.

He therefore switched to being a professor-regent at the collège d'Harcourt in 1583, then at the collège de Boncourt in 1586. He was offered a chair at the Collège royal in 1590 when Jacques Hélias left it but Henry IV of France blocked the nomination and instead replaced Hélias with François Parent. Another nomination in 1595 was successful, taking over the chair in ancient Greek left vacant by Daniel d'Auge. In 1600, Critton went to Rome for the jubilee and on returning to Paris applied to become a doctor in canon law. His final career move was being received as a jurisconsultum by the faculté de décret de l'Université de Paris in 1609.

He married Hélène, one of the seven daughters of the Scottish scholar Adam Blackwood. Critton only vacated his chair at the Collège royal on his death in Paris - he was succeeded in it by Nicolas Bourbon. His now-lost tomb in the Jacobins church in Paris had a French epitaph which translated as "George Critton, vibrant doctor in laws and historiography and lector to the king in the Greek and Latin languages". It also had a bust of him and a marble tablet with a second epitaph in Latin and ancient Greek.

== Selected works ==
- In felicem Ser. Poloniæ Regis inaugurationem Congratulatio, Paris, 1573 - a poem on the election of Henri de Valois, duc d'Anjou.
- Selectiores notæ in Epigrammata è libro primo Græcæ Anthologiæ decerpta, et Latino carmine reddita, Paris, 1584
- Laudatio funebris habita in exequiis Petri Ronsardi, Paris, 1586
- Oratio de Apollinis Oraculis et de sacro Principis oraculo, Paris, 1596
- De Sortibus Homericis Oratio, Paris, 1597
- In Oppianum de Venatione prefatio, Paris, 1598
- Orationes duæ habitæ in auditorio regio, anno 1608, Paris, 1609 - one on the laws of Draco and Solon and the other on the title ‘De Judiciis’ in Harmenopulus.

== Bibliography ==
- (in French) Jean-Pierre Niceron, Mémoires pour servir à l'histoire des hommes illustres dans la république des lettres, avec un catalogue raisonné de leurs ouvrages, vol. XXXVII, 1737, p. 346-357.
- (in French) Claude-Pierre Goujet (1758). Mémoire historique et littéraire sur le Collège royal de France. Vol. I. Paris..
- This article incorporates text from a publication now in the public domain: "Crichton, George". Dictionary of National Biography. London: Smith, Elder & Co. 1885–1900.
