= Margaret Carwood =

Maid-of-honor at court of Mary, Queen of Scots

Margaret Carwood (died 1612), was a maid-of-honour or chamberer at the court of Mary, Queen of Scots. Her wedding to John Stewart of Fincastle was celebrated at the time of the murder of Henry Stewart, Lord Darnley, the Queen's consort.

== Background ==
Margaret was an heiress of the family of Carwood of that Ilk in Lanarkshire. Her sister Janet married John Fleming of Persellands. Margaret became a lady of the Queen's chamber in May 1564.

When Mary was pregnant in Edinburgh Castle with her son James, Margaret helped draw up her will with a list of bequests of personal jewellery from her cabinet. The queen's bequest to Margaret was a diamond-set cross with her miniature portrait. In August 1565 the queen gave her sewing silk for embroidering her linen. On 5 October 1565 the queen gave her a coffer and a length of taffeta, and in November and June 1566 material for black velvet gowns.

Margaret worked with Piers Martin, the tapestry-man, in 1566 making a mat and a green canopy and coverlet for the Queen. She was also the Queen's "Pantrice", in charge of the royal pantry. Mary gave Margaret a black silk dress made in the Spanish fashion.

== Events at the end of the reign ==
In March 1566, according to some accounts, after the murder of Mary's Italian secretary David Rizzio, Margaret Carwood accompanied Mary, Darnley, and the servant or musician Bastian Pagez on their escape from Edinburgh to Dunbar Castle. A 17th-century history mentions that a Sebastian Broune and a lady-in-waiting rode with the party. An account of the ride to Dunbar by Anthony Standen refers to the Queen's female servant as her chamberer.

George Buchanan wrote in his Detection that Margaret was privy to all the Queen's secrets. Buchanan's story, published to incriminate the queen, was that Mary lodged in the Exchequer House in Edinburgh rather than her Palace in September 1566. In a night-time escapade the queen and Margaret Carwood dangled another servant Margaret Beaton, Lady Reres, with a string or a belt, over the garden wall to fetch the Earl of Bothwell.

On 8 February 1567, Mary and Henry Stuart, Lord Darnley gave Margaret Carwood an annual pension of 300 merks. The money would come from rents and dues of Kinclevin near Perth. The privy seal letter called her Mary's "lovit familiar servitrix".

After the murder of Lord Darnley on 10 February 1567, during his trial, the servant called French Paris (Nicolas Hubert) declared that he went the Kirk o'Field lodging on 8 February to retrieve a fur covering of the queen's, on Margaret Carwood's orders. Margaret was attending Mary at the Kirk o'Field, waiting with the other ladies in the queen's chamber next to Darnley's bedchamber, when the ladies were suddenly called to Holyroodhouse. Some histories say that Margaret married Bastian Pagez on Sunday 9 February 1567. Sources agree that Mary attended a masque or dance in honour of Bastian's marriage that night. Mary's husband, was killed at 2:00am the next morning. Margaret's wedding was celebrated at Holyroodhouse on the following day.

One of the Casket Letters, which were thought to incriminate the Queen in the murder of Darnley, mentions Margaret Carwood and her previous departure from court. The letter was endorsed by its Scottish copyist, "Anentes the depesch of Margaret Carwood, quhilk was before her marriage, (proves her affection)", and by another hand that Margaret was in special trust with the Queen.

== Two weddings and a funeral ==
Bastian Pagez married Christily Hogg on 9 February, and Margaret Carwood married John Stewart of Tulliepowrie and Fincastle, on Tuesday 11 February 1567, two days afterwards.

Queen Mary gave Margaret Carwood a gift of 15 ells of black velvet for her wedding. Mary's participation at Margaret's wedding on the day after Darnley's murder caused adverse comment. The date, 11 February, was given in the list of evidence and charges against Mary supplied to Elizabeth I of England called Hay's articles or the "Book of Articles", which mentions both the masque attended by the Queen for Bastian's marriage before the King's murder, and Margaret's marriage the morning after the murder. Hay's articles allege that there was no show of mourning clothes, and more enquiry made after money stolen from Margaret Carwood than for Darnley's murder, and the King was buried at night without ceremony.

In March 1584 John Stewart and Margaret Carwood complained to the Privy Council about their land near Dunkeld, held from the estate of Dunfermline Abbey. The Commendator Robert Pitcairn had offered them a new tenancy contract called a "tack", but the remaining monks refused to sign it.
