= Frederick Adolphus Porcher =

American politician (1809–1888)

Frederick Adolphus Porcher (January 16, 1809 – October 15, 1888) was an American politician and educator.

== Early life ==
Frederick Adolphus Porcher was born on January 16, 1809, at Cedar Spring plantation near Charleston, South Carolina. He spent his early years in Pineville, North Carolina. He graduated from Yale College in 1828.

== Career ==
Porcher served as a member of the South Carolina General Assembly in 1831. He served several terms. Leaving politics, he also tried to farm. In 1849, he became a professor of Belles Lettres and History at the College of Charleston. He continued teaching until 1881. He then lectured to advanced classes until his ill prevented him in 1886.

Porcher was one of the founders of the South Carolina Historical Society and served as its president from 1856 until his death. He wrote a history of Craven County.

== Personal life ==
Porcher had at least three daughters. He died on October 15, 1888.
