= Adam Blackwood (writer) =

Scottish author and apologist for Mary, Queen of Scots

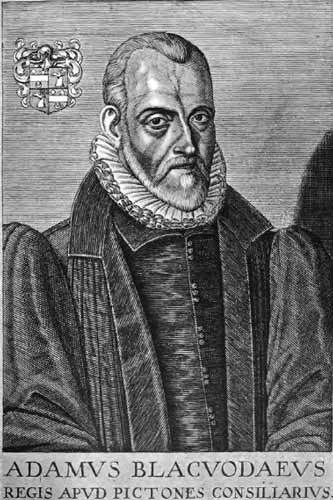
- An engraved portrait of Blackwood by Picart, in his official robes, contained in Blackwood's complete works in Latin and French, published in Paris in 1644, with a life and eulogistic notice by Gabriel Naudé.
- Born: 1539; Dunfermline, Scotland
- Died: 1613 (aged 73–74); Poitiers, France
- Writing career
- Notable work: Apology for Kings

Adam Blackwood (1539–1613) was a Scottish author and apologist for Mary, Queen of Scots.

== Life ==
He was born in 1539 in Dunfermline, Scotland, to William Blackwood and Helen Reid. Adam was orphaned at a young age and his education was sponsored by his great uncle, Robert Reid, Bishop of Orkney. Blackwood went to the University of Paris studying mathematics, philosophy, and Semitic languages and then on to two years at Toulouse to study civil law, with Mary's direct patronage. then in the French Court. In 1567-8 he was a rector of the University of Paris, teaching philosophy.

His 1575 work on the need to extirpate heresy, De Conjunctione Religionis et Imperii, was so highly esteemed by James Beaton, archbishop of Glasgow, that he recommended Queen Mary to bestow on him the office of counsellor or judge of the parliament of Poitiers, which she did in 1579. (Note: Henry III had assigned the province of Poitou to Mary in payment of her dowry.) Some misunderstanding regarding the nature of this office seems to have given rise to the statement of Mackenzie and others that Blackwood was a professor of civil law at the University of Poitiers.

At Poitiers he collected an extensive library, though he also frequently visited Mary during her captivity in England and was untiring in his efforts in her service. He died in 1613, and was buried in St. Porcharius church in Poitiers, where a marble monument was erected to his memory.

== Marriage and issue ==
On 31 May 1576 he married Marie or Catherine Courtinier, daughter of Nicolas, procureur de roi for the Poitou. With her he had four sons and seven daughters, including Helen, who married George Crichton or Critton, a lawyer and hellenist of Scottish origin who was a professor at the Collège royal de France. After Critton's death in 1611 she married François de la Mothe le Vayer, then a lawyer in the Parlement of Paris and later a skeptic philosopher, in 1622. With her second husband she had a son, François. Another daughter of Blackwood, Catherine, married Guillaume Le Bel, lord of Bussy, and with him had two children, Paul and Honorée - the latter became a friend of Molière in the 1660s and the subject of a 'historiette' by Tallemant des Réaux.

== Works ==
=== De Vinculo... ===
In Paris in 1575 he published a work on the relation between religion and government, whose full title is De Vinculo; seu Conjunctione Religionis et Imperii libri duo, quibus conjurationum traducuntur insidiæ fuco religionis adumbratæ. A third book appeared in 1612. The work was dedicated to Queen Mary of Scotland and, in keeping with his poem commemorating Charles in 1574, was intended to demonstrate how rulers needed to extirpate heresy as a phase of rebellion against a divinely constituted authority.

=== Adversus Georgii Buchanani dialogum ... ===
Encouraged by the success of his first two works, he set himself to the hard and ambitious task of grappling with George Buchanan, whose views he denounced with great bitterness and severity in Apologia pro Regibus, adversus Georgii Buchanani Dialogum de Jure Regni apud Scotos, published in Poitiers in 1581 and in Paris seven years later. In that work he countered Buchanan's dialogue De Iure Regni apud Scotos, (1579), in which Buchanan attempted to justify to the forced abdication of Mary, Queen of Scots.

=== Martyre de la Royne d'Escosse ... ===
After Mary's death he published a long exposé of her treatment in imprisonment, interspersed with passionate denunciations of her enemies, especially John Knox and Elizabeth I of England. The work portrayed her execution as a Catholic martyrdom, as shown by its full title Martyre de la Royne d'Escosse, Douairiere de France; contenant le vray discours des traïsons à elle faictes à la suscitation d'Elizabet Angloise, par lequel les mensonges, calomnies, et faulses accusations dressées contre ceste tresvertueuse, trescatholique et tresillustre princesse son esclarcies et son innocence averse.

A French inscription in the book stated it was published in Edinburgh in 1587 by one "Jean Nafield", but that name is fictitious and the real place of publication was Paris. It was reprinted at Antwerp in 1588, and again in 1589, and is also included in Samuel Jebb's collection, De Vita et Rebus gestis Mariae Scotorum Regime Autores sedecim, vol. ii., London, (1725).

At the end of the Martyre there is a collection of verses in Latin, French, and Italian, on Mary and Elizabeth. A fragment of a translation of the work into English, the manuscript of which belongs to the end of the sixteenth or beginning of the seventeenth century, was published by the Maitland Club in 1834.

=== Other works ===
- Caroli IX Pompa Funebris versiculis expressa per A. B. J.C., Paris, 1574 - a eulogistic poem in memory of Charles IX
- The Apology for Kings
- Inauguratio Jacobi Magnæ Britanitæ Regis, Paris, 1606 - a poem on the accession of Mary's son James to the English throne
- Sanctarum Precationum Procemia, seu mavia, Ejaculationes Animæ ad Orandum se præparantis, Poitiers, 1598 and 1608 - pious meditations in prose and verse
- In Psalmum Davidis quinquagesimum, cujus initium est Miserere mei Deus, Adami Blacvodæi Meditatio, Poitiers, 1608 - a penitential study
- Varii generis Poemata, Pictavis, 1609 - miscellaneous poems
