= Porcarius of Poitiers =

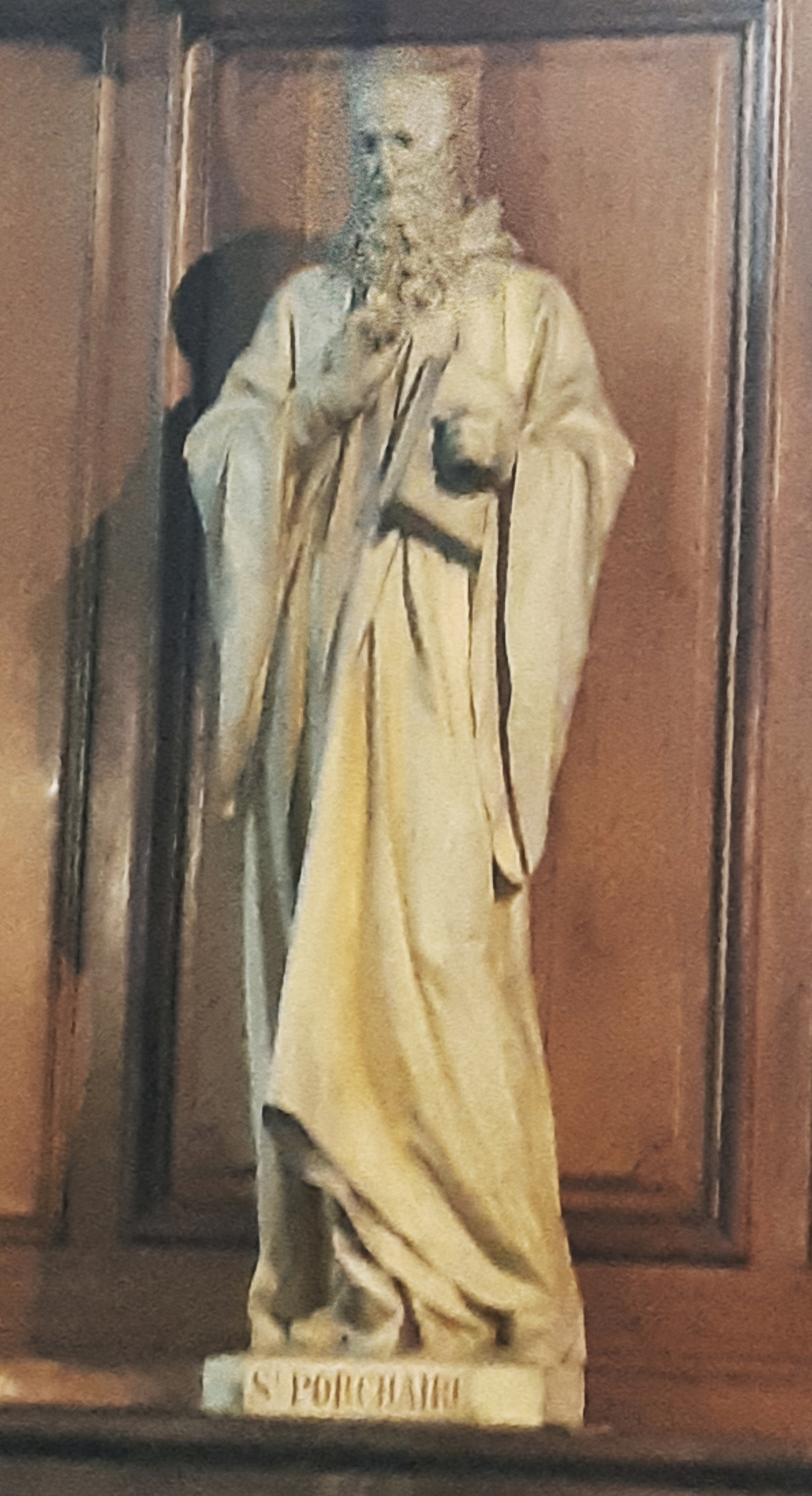
Statue of him in the church dedicated to him in Poitiers.

Porcharius or Porcarius (French - Porchaire or Porcarie; died around 600) was abbot of Saint-Hilaire le Grand. A contemporary of Radegonde and Gregory of Tours, he is venerated as a saint by the Roman Catholic Church, with a feast day on 5 June.

== Life ==
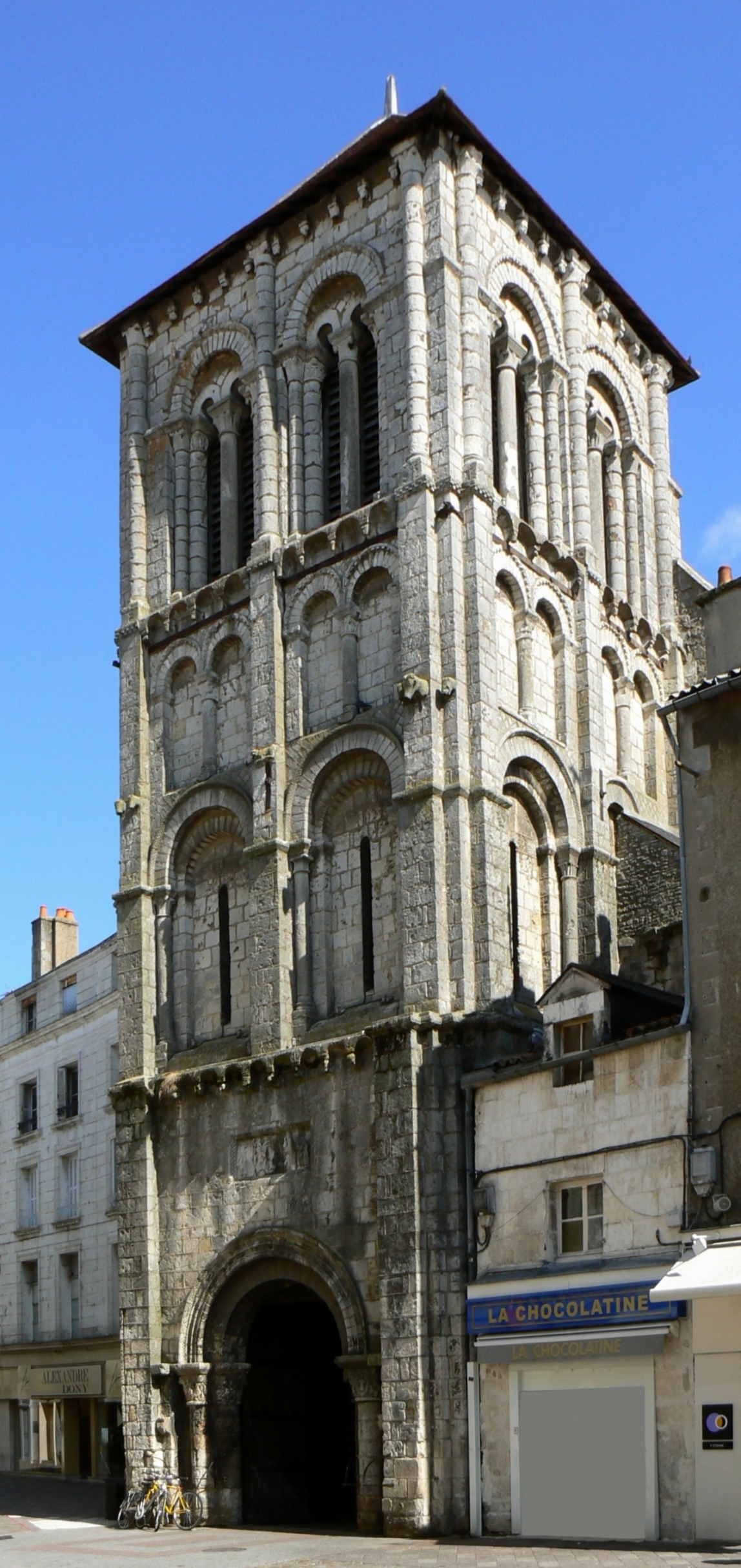
The tower of the church dedicated to him

Almost nothing is known of his origins or life except his being sent to Holy Cross Abbey when its nuns revolted against their abbess Leubovère in 589, led by Basine and Chrodielde. The main source on that episode is Gregory's History of the Franks, which tells how they initially took refuge with Gregory (then Bishop of Tours) then Porcharius in the basilica of Saint-Hilaire. He tried to mediate between the two parties but unsuccessfully and henchmen recruited by the nuns chased out the bishops who also went to try to resolve the dispute. They then even stormed the monastery and kidnapped the abbess. Childebert II, king of Austrasia, then ordered Maccon (one of his counts) to put down the revolt. The nuns were finally judged and rejoined their convent.

At his death he had a reputation for kindness and saintliness and so his body was placed in the church of Saint-Sauveur, near the enclosure to which he had retired. At the end of the 9th century Thibaut, treasurer of Saint-Hilaire, built a sanctuary near the palace on a main road, dedicated it to Porcharius and moved his relics there, where they were venerated in the crypt until being moved into the centre of the choir in 1951.

He is mainly venerated in Poitiers, though his cult has also spread to the surrounding region to some degree. Towns now in Charente-Maritime and Deux-Sèvres were named after him.
