= Helen Littil =

Scottish nurse of King James VI and I

Helen Littil was a Scottish courtier, the nurse of King James VI and I.

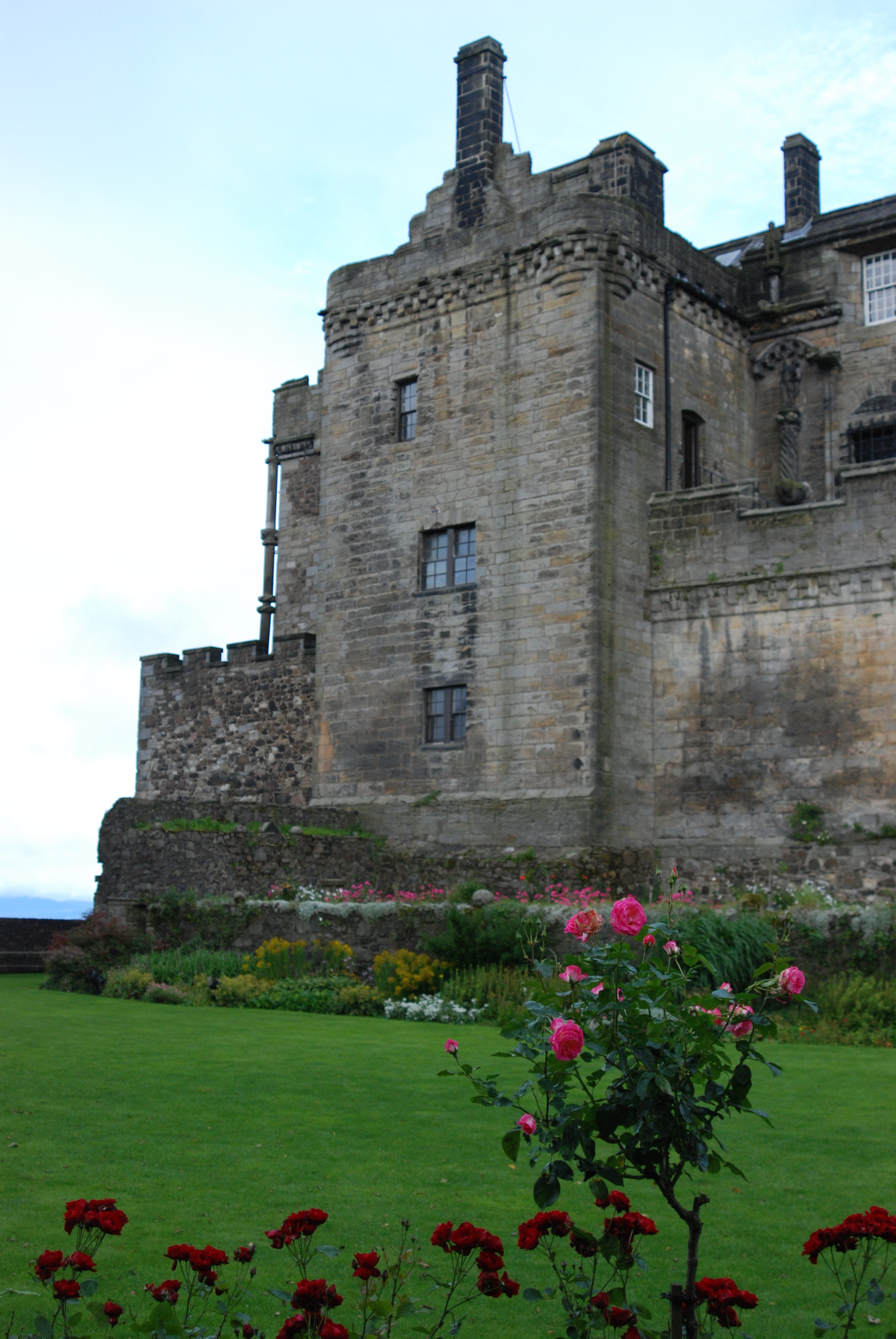
James VI and I grew up in the Prince's Tower at Stirling Castle

She was described as the 'nureis' of the son of Mary, Queen of Scots and Henry Stuart, Lord Darnley. She was probably the young king's wet-nurse. Margaret Beaton, Lady Reres, was also described as the king's nurse, and by later biographers as a wet-nurse. Lady Reres was an older woman and it has been suggested she was more like a governess to the child in the household. One of the earliest descriptions of Prince James at Edinburgh Castle was given by the English ambassador Henry Killigrew. He spoke to Mary on 24 June 1566 and saw the baby "sucking of his nouryce". The queen's tailor Jean de Compiègne made a gown of taffeta banded with velvet for the nurse in July 1566.

Helen Littil joined the household for the young king at Stirling Castle and was probably the "mistress nurse" or "maistres nureis" mentioned in a list of fabrics sent to Stirling at the request of Mary, Queen of Scots, on 5 September 1566. In December Lady Reres and Helen Littil were given black velvet gowns with black satin doublets and skirt fronts for the baptism of the Prince. John Balfour, one of the queen's valets, bought this cloth.

Helen Littil was married to Alexander Gray (died 1571), a burgess of Edinburgh related to the Napier family. In early modern Scotland married women did not usually adopt their husband's surnames. Her daughter, "Nanis Gray" was with her at Stirling Castle in 1567. They had two servants at Stirling in 1567, Helen Blyth and Gilbert Ramsay. Another of Helen Littil's daughters Grissel Gray, was appointed as one of the keepers of the king's clothes or linen cloths. Grissell Gray was described as a seamstress or "sewstar" and "seamster" in 1579. A Latin account calls her "sartrici lie semistar domini regis".

Queen Mary gave Helen Littil and her husband half of the lands of Kingsbarns in Fife, for their lifetimes, as a reward for her service. This gave her income of around £20 Scots in money and a quantity of cereal crop yearly, with 60 "cayne" capons. The poultry were due to her as a landlord.

Annabell Murray, Countess of Mar was the head of the household. In 1567, James Cunningham of Drumquhassle was the Master of Household, Helen Littil was the chief nurse, five ladies including Christian Stewart, daughter of John Stewart, Commendator of Coldingham and granddaughter of James V, took turns to rock the royal cradle, while the four Hudson brothers played their viols, there were cooks and brewers. Margaret Balcomie, also known as Margaret Malcomy, washed the king's linen, and she had washed the linen of the infant Mary, Queen of Scots at Linlithgow Palace in 1543.

The tutor Peter Young recorded that Helen Littel gave King James a book of psalms and a work by Guillaume de Salluste du Bartas. One of the five rockers, Jane Oliphant, gave him a prayer book. By 1586, Helen Litill had married a second husband, Thomas Livingston, Parson of Carnwath.

In April 1592, James VI regranted Helen Littil the lands at Kingsbarns in Fife, which were within the dower lands of Anne of Denmark. In May 1594, new clothes were bought for Helen Littil, and her two daughters Grissel and Sara Gray, who were to be guests at the baptism of Prince Henry at Stirling. Prince Henry's nurse at this time was Margaret Masterton. Helen Littil continued to be paid a yearly pension of £555-6s-8d Scots.
