= Bacton =

Bacton may refer to various places in the United Kingdom:

- Bacton, Herefordshire, England
- Bacton, Norfolk, England
  - Bacton Gas Terminal
- Bacton, Suffolk, England
