= Bacton Altar Cloth =

Dress of Elizabeth I of England

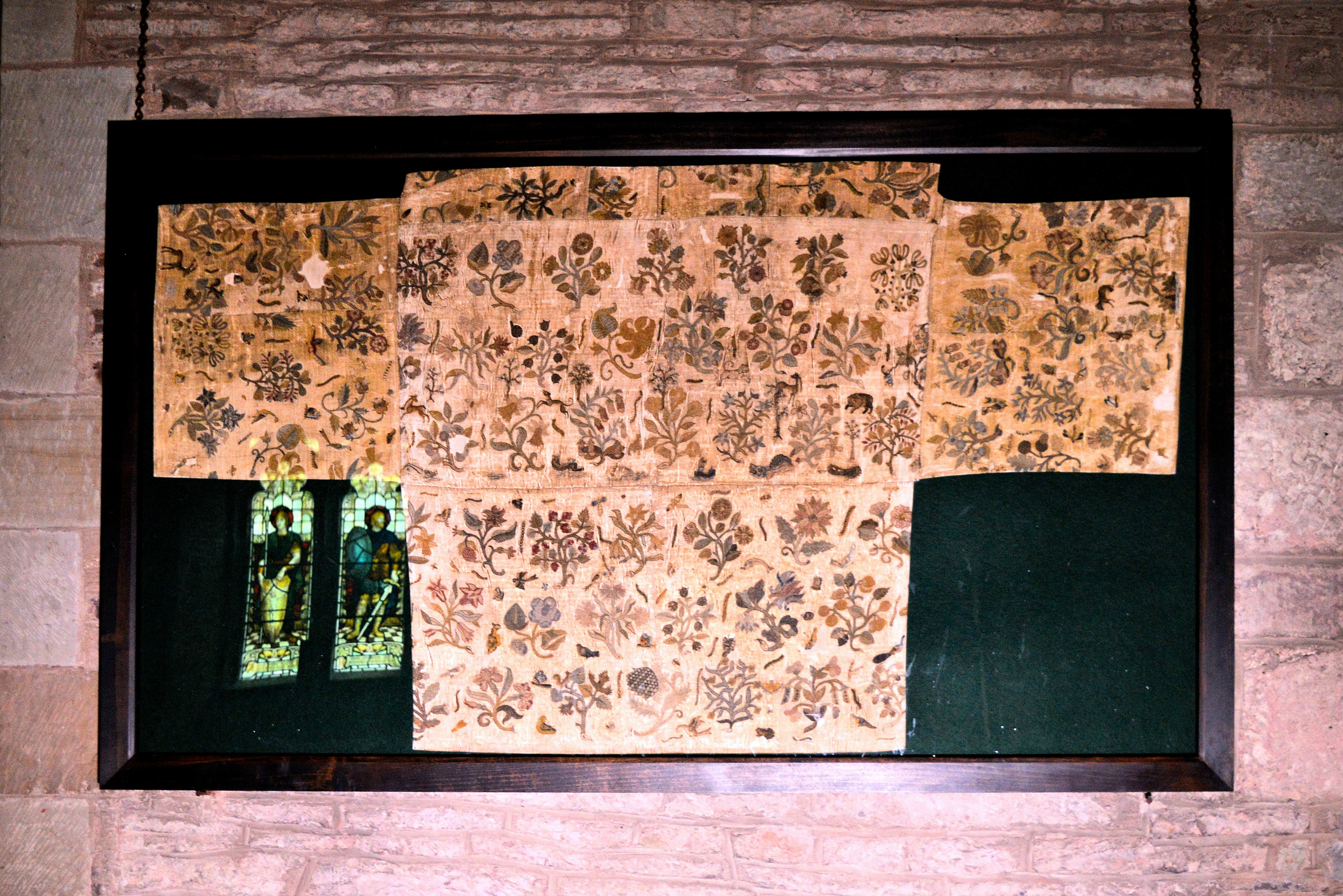
The restored Altar Cloth in June 2019

The Bacton Altar Cloth is a 16th-century garment that is considered the sole surviving dress of Queen Elizabeth I. The cloth, embroidered in an elaborate floral design and made of cloth of silver, is an important relic of Tudor fashion and luxury trade, containing dyes from as far away as India and Mexico. It was rediscovered in 2015 at St Faith's Church in Bacton, Herefordshire, where it had been used as an altar cloth for centuries. After several years of conservation and restoration, the garment was exhibited to the public in 2019 and 2020 along with the Rainbow Portrait, in which the queen is depicted wearing a highly similar dress.

== Description ==
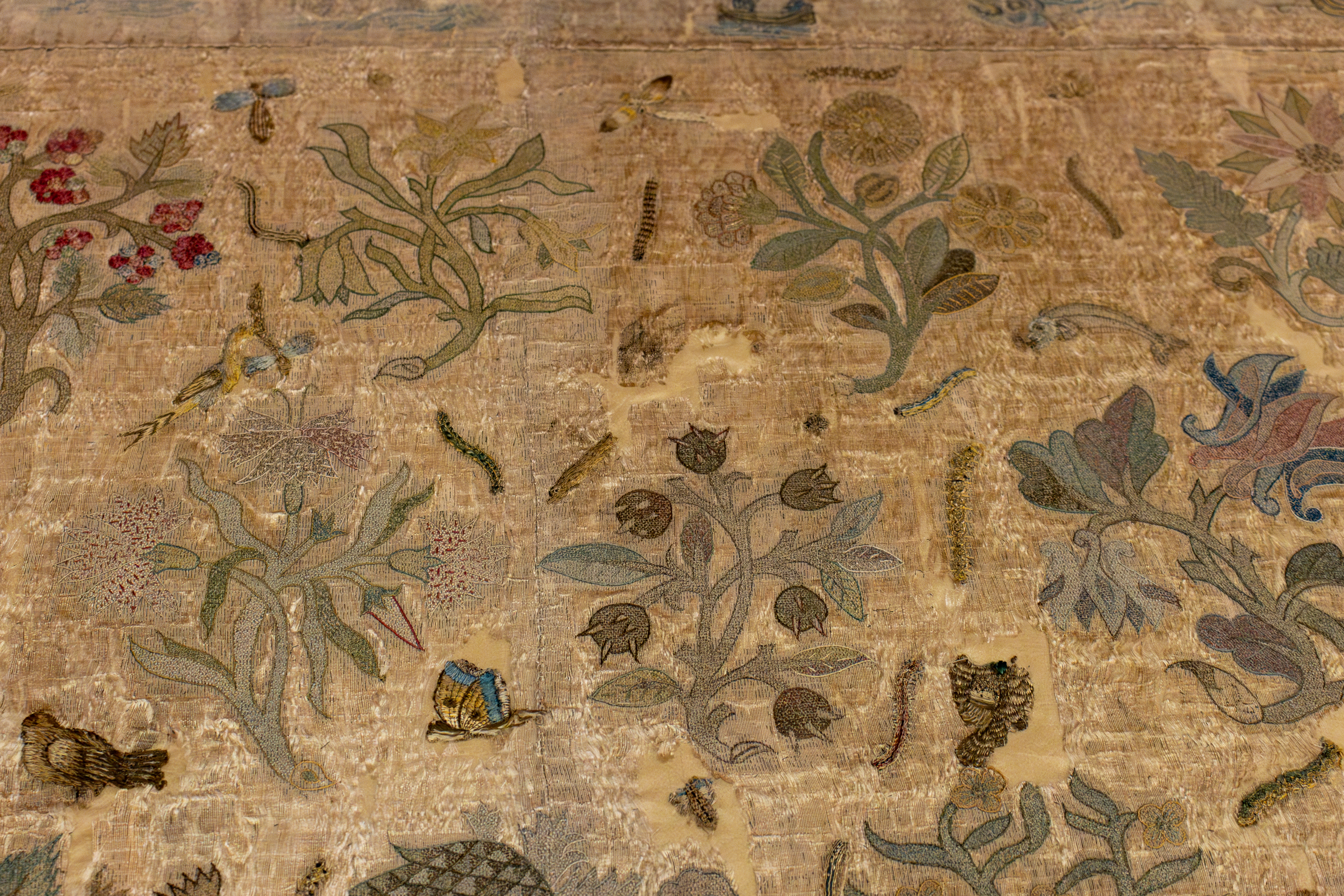
A closer look at the intricate embroidery of the dress-turned-altar cloth

The garment is made of cream-coloured silk and Italian cloth of silver. Cloth of silver was, under Sumptuary Law, reserved for members of the royal family, which was an early clue to its origin. It was elaborately embroidered with colourful flowers and vegetation in silk, silver and gold thread, including caterpillars and deer. Unusually, the embroidery was stitched straight onto the fabric, indicating expert workmanship and therefore an elite owner. Dye used in the embroidery thread included cochineal red from Mexico, evidence of early trade from North America, as well Indian indigo blue traded through Portugal.

== History of the dress ==
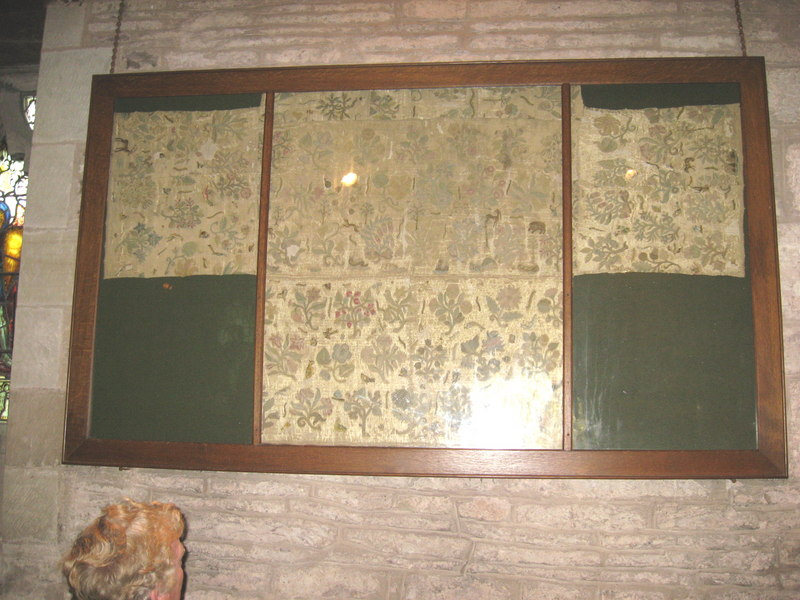
Bacton Altar Cloth on display in 2007 in St Faith's Church, Bacton

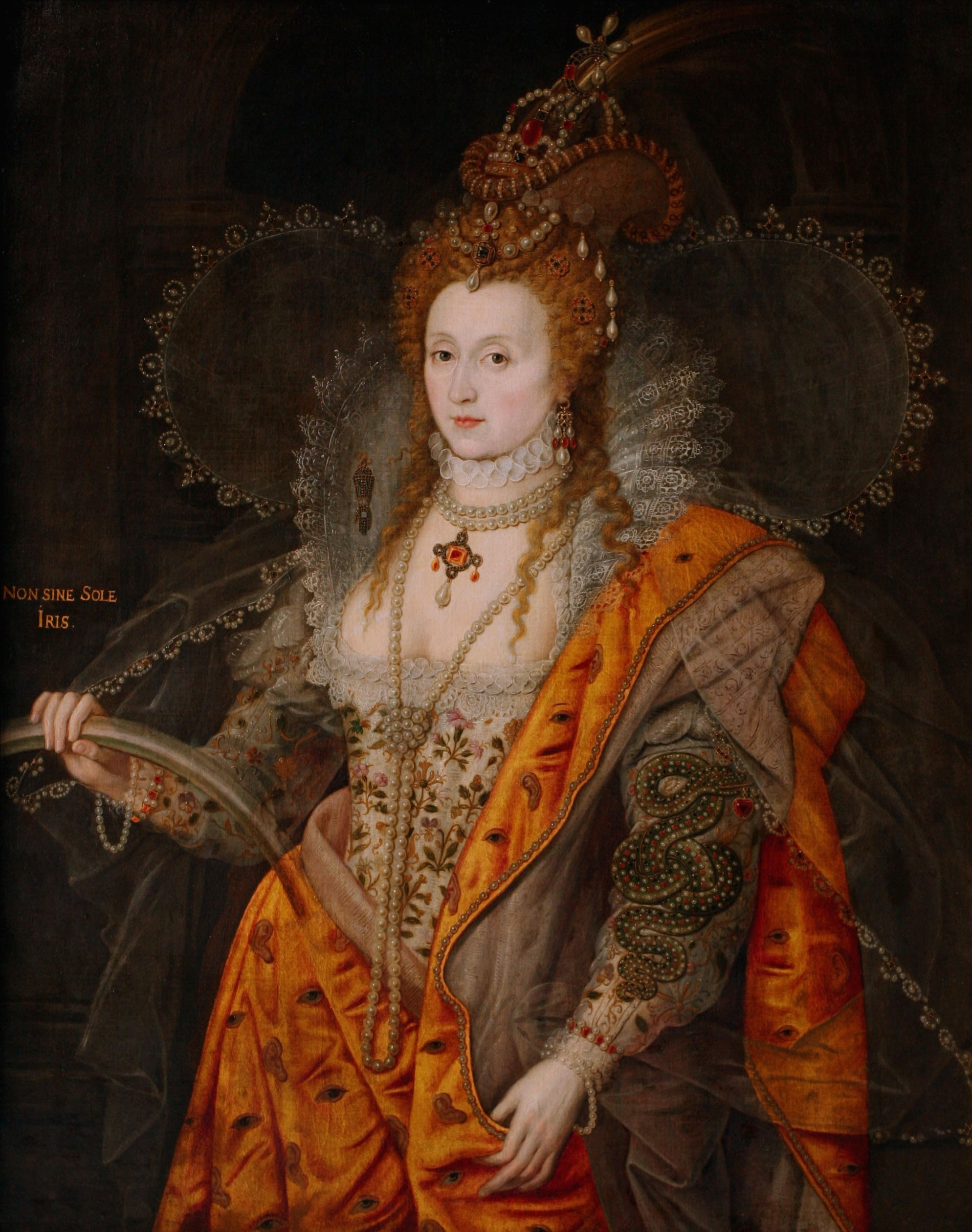
Elizabeth I wore a highly similar dress in her Rainbow Portrait

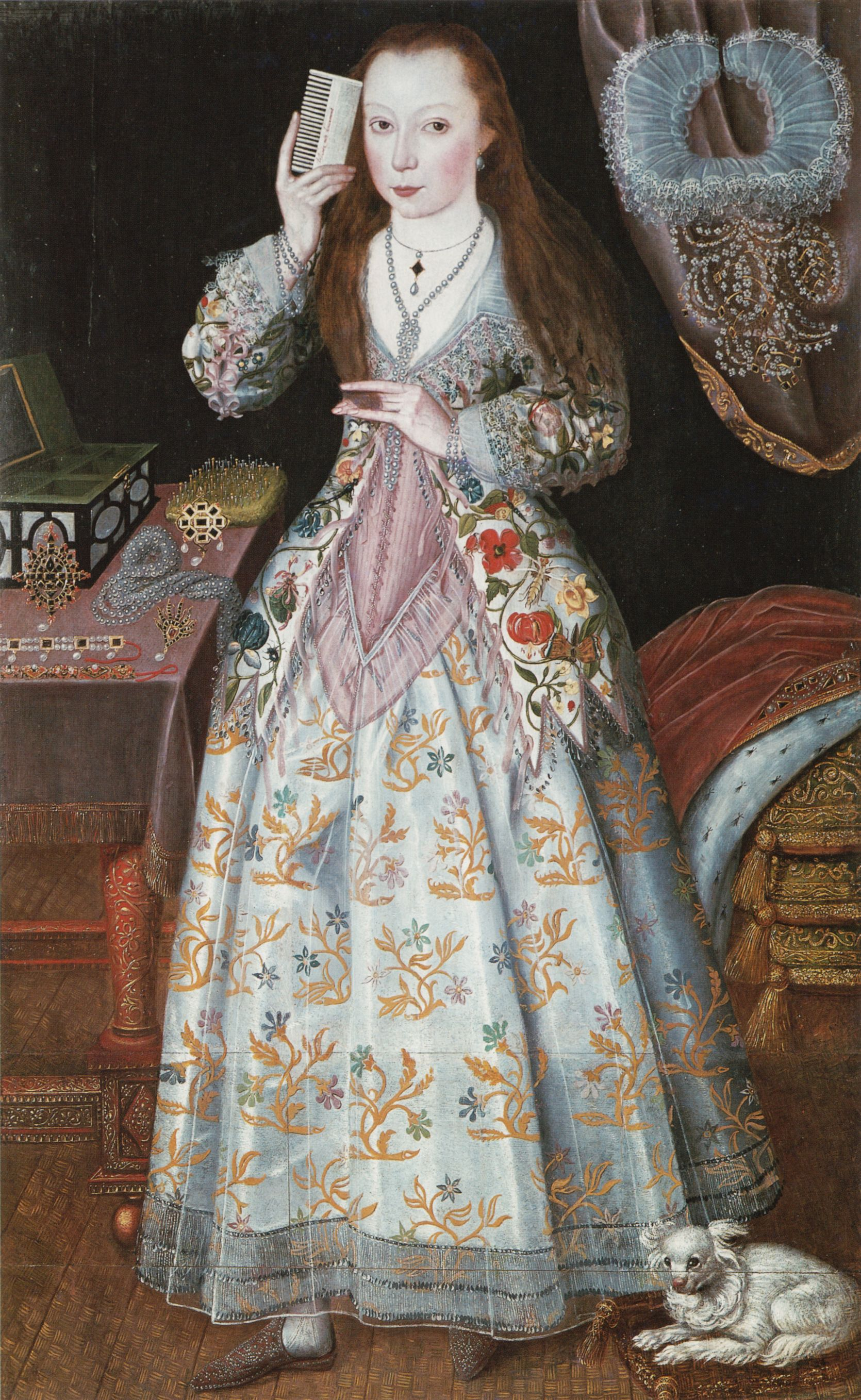
Elizabeth Vernon wearing a petticoat with slips of embroidery to similar effect.

The dress dates to late in Queen Elizabeth I's life, when she was nearly 70. It is highly similar to the embroidered dress she is depicted wearing in her Rainbow Portrait. The style of the floral embroidery puts the dress squarely into the 1590s, as anything from later years would have featured more scroll-like detail on the stems and vines, in line with early Stuart trends; additionally, only inventories from the later part of Elizabeth's reign show such expensive dresses were in her possession.

It seems possible that the garment was given to Bacton Church by the courtier Blanche Parry, or, because of the stylistic evidence of the date of the embroidery, by Elizabeth in memory of Blanche Parry after her death in 1590. Parry, from Bacton, was a personal attendant of the Queen, and held the offices of Chief Gentlewoman of the Queen's Most Honourable Privy Chamber and Keeper of Her Majesty's Jewels. Parry, who never married, remained devoted to Elizabeth and was her longest-serving courtier, by her side for 56 years. In her will, she left money for the church and an almshouse in Bacton.

The Altar Cloth had survived the centuries as it was considered a sacred object by the parishioners at St Faith's Church in Bacton. Its probable connection to Blanche Parry and the court of Elizabeth I was never forgotten, and in the 1870s it was thought that Blanche Parry had embroidered the cloth herself, for one of her own dresses to wear at court.

== Rediscovery ==
The Bacton cloth was exhibited in London by T W. Colt Williams at a meeting of the Royal Archaeological Institute on 4 June 1885. It was also shown at the Society of Antiquaries on 18 June 1885. In 1909, the cloth was framed in oak and mounted on the wall above the pews. Nearby is the Blanche Parry Monument, the earliest depiction of the Queen as Gloriana. For 106 years the framed cloth remained on the north wall of Bacton Church, away from direct sunlight, which helped preserve the garment from fading.

In the early 20th century, Sir Lionel Cust, then Surveyor of the King's Pictures, recognised the importance of the cloth, after his wife Sybil Cust researched and published a short biography of Parry. Lionel Cust published an article in 1918 about its similarity to the costume of Elizabeth I depicted in her portraits. The altar cloth was examined by the dress historian Janet Arnold who wrote about it in 1988, describing the fabric as "silver chamblet" in poor condition.

== Return to prominence ==
In 2015, the garment was researched by Ruth Elizabeth Richardson while writing a new biography of Blanche Parry and Lady Troy. Richardson recognised the rarity and importance of the cloth. Subsequently, Eleri Lynn, a curator at the Historic Royal Palaces who was researching a book on Tudor fashion, saw Richardson's photos of the cloth online. Lynn examined the cloth and discovered it was of extraordinarily high quality, and observed the evidence of pattern cutting that reveals it had been a dress. Lynn recognised that it is a unique survival, being the only known cloth with direct embroidery from any museum or collection worldwide. This led to the cloth being restored and eventually displayed to the public at Hampton Court Palace.

Following display at Hampton Court in 2019-20, the cloth subsequently went on display as part of The Tudors: Passion, Power and Politics at National Museums Liverpool from May to August 2022 and later at Guildhall Art Gallery from September to December 2023 as part of the Gold and Silver Wire Drawers 400th anniversary celebrations.

== See also ==
- List of individual dresses
