= Baptism of James VI =

1566 baptism of son of Mary, Queen of Scots

The baptism of James VI was celebrated at Stirling Castle in December 1566 with a masque, fireworks, and a staged assault on a mock fortress. The entertainment was devised by George Buchanan and Bastian Pagez.

== Prince James ==
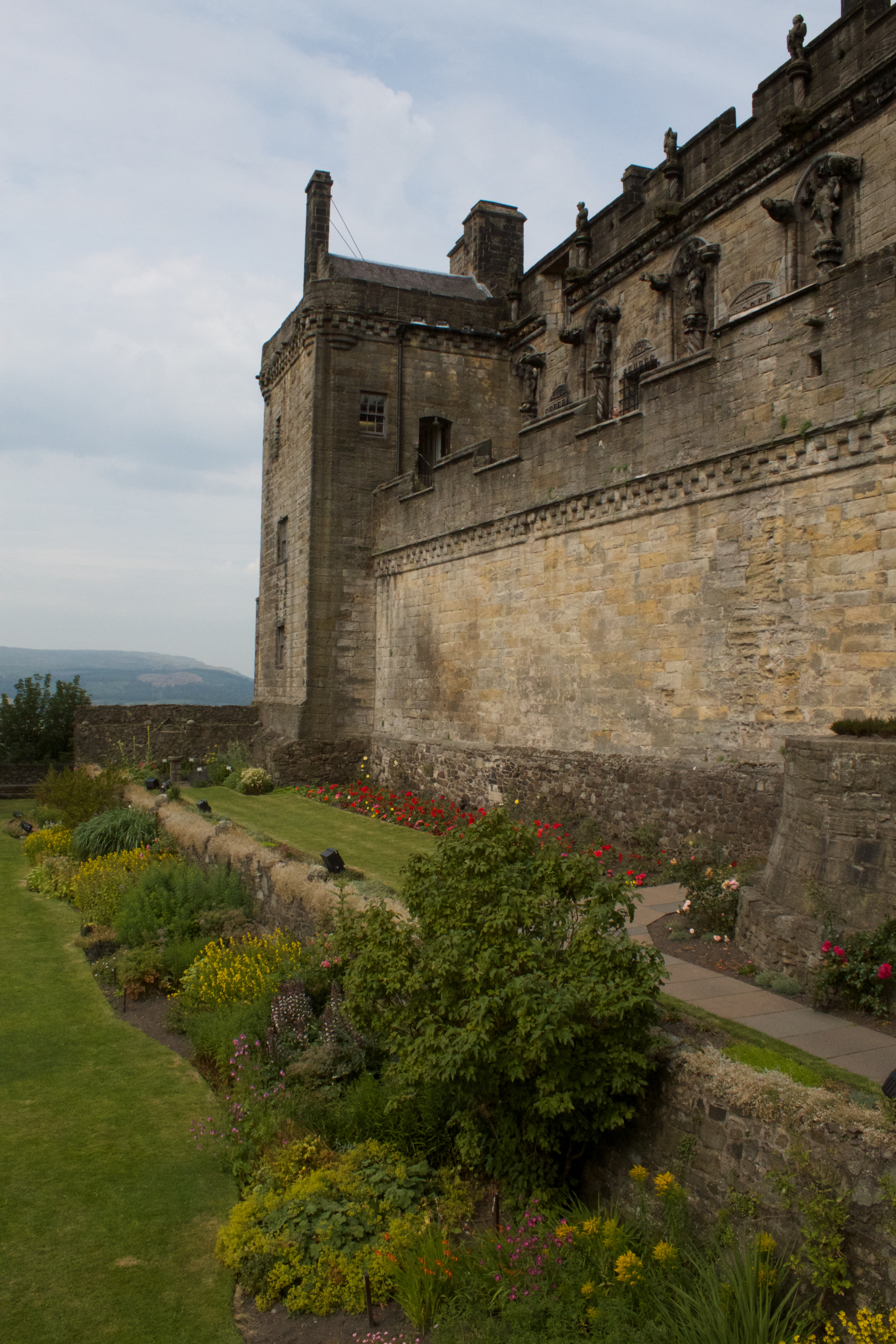
The infant Prince James was housed in the Prince's Tower at Stirling Castle.

James was the son of Mary, Queen of Scots, and Henry Stuart, Lord Darnley. He was born on 19 June 1566 at Edinburgh Castle. The midwife was Margaret Asteane. He was taken to Stirling Castle where a nursery was prepared for him. His cradle was made by the queen's menusier or upholsterer Nicholas Guillebault and placed under a blue plaiding canopy, rocked by a team of five aristocrats including the queen's niece, Christine Stewart, Katherine Murray, and Alison Sinclair. The prince's household at Stirling included Margaret Beaton, Lady Reres.

== Clothes and colours ==
In December Lady Reres and the prince's nurse Helen Littil were dressed in black velvet gowns with black satin doublets and skirt fronts. John Balfour, one of the queen's valets, bought this cloth. Mary was said to have given clothes to members of court above the entitlement of their rank, to reflect her status on the day. John Forster, an English border warden, heard in September 1566 that Mary had ordered clothes for Bothwell in blue, the Earl of Argyll in red, and the Earl of Moray in green, "at her own charge". She asked her lords to each bring a certain number of retainers dressed in colours. The preparations at Stirling continued "with all speed".

It was later said that Mary dressed all her household and nobility in new clothes for baptism at her expense, exceeding their status and degree, the costumes involving cloth of gold and silver and tissue. This is in part a response to George Buchanan's claim that Mary dressed the Earl of Bothwell in magnificent clothes for the events but neglected Lord Darnley. The idea that Mary clothed Bothwell in rich garments for the Stirling baptism was included in the "Book of Articles" written against her by her enemies and presented at the Westminster Conference in 1568.

According to Buchanan, in response to criticism about disparities in Darnley and Bothwell's dress, Mary blamed the embroiderers and tailors, but it was known that she had embroidered some details for Bothwell's costume herself. Mary was said to have designed or devised Bothwell's clothes, and, according to another hostile account "she feigned to be in a great rage and choler against the King's tailors that had not made such apparel as she had devised for him against the triumph". Darnley, it was supposed, was not able to attend the public events at Stirling because Mary had not provided him adequate costume.

== Preparations for the baptism and masques ==
In July, Mary commissioned a "chrimatory" of gold for the holy oils used in the ceremony. While Mary was hunting with Darnley at Cramalt Tower in August 1566, she wrote invitations to the baptism. On 6 October the Privy Council allowed a tax to be raised to entertain the ambassadors at the baptism, £6000 would come from the church, £4000 from the barons and freeholders, and £2000 from burgh towns. Simon Preston of Craigmillar was receiver of the tax.

Most of the expenses of the baptism were paid from this tax of £12,000 Scots, to which Edinburgh contributed 500 merks. John Forster reported that Mary also intended to borrow money from other Scottish burgh towns of Scotland. Some money was allocated from farm produce collected as tiends but there was administrative confusion when Mary gave away the goods leaving a shortfall.

There are records of making the fireworks and costumes for the soldiers, but few details for the masques, costumes, and props used in the Great Hall. The decoration of the Great Hall was in part the responsibility of Mary's wardrobe servant Servais de Condé, and he recorded that the Prince's bed at the baptism had a cover of cloth of silver. Some older velvet and damask beds and bed hangings were remodelled and refurbished. Nicolas Guillebault, the menusier, upholstered chairs, folding stools, and stools of ease with velvet and Morocco leather. The queen's tailor, Jean de Compiègne, made a cover to wrap Prince James at the baptism from 10 ells of silver damask, and six hanks of silver thread for embroidery were sent to Annabell Murray, Countess of Mar.

The staged events at the baptism have been compared with the festival held at Bayonne by Catherine de' Medici and Charles IX of France in 1565, which may have been the model for the programme at Stirling. At Bayonne an artificial castle in the ball room was besieged to illustrate the triumph of Christianity according to a prophecy of Merlin. Arthurian themes were also explored at Stirling. At Stirling, three "counterfeit devils" with actors playing "moors" and Highland men unsuccessfully attacked a mock castle.

A part of the entertainment was written by George Buchanan, a poet in Latin who would become the young king's tutor. Bastian Pagez, a French valet, worked on the costumes and devised the choreography. The royal accounts record that Bastian was given 40 ells of "taffeteis of cord" in three colours for seven (or some) "preparatives" for the baptism. "Preparatives" here may mean "harbingers," the role of the satyrs at the feast, but may just mean the preparations in general. Agnes Strickland compared this order for taffeta with Forster's September report of outfits in red, blue, and green for the Earls of Moray, Argyll and Bothwell. Anne of Denmark ordered a comparable amount of taffeta, 48 ells, for a masque performed in September 1591.

Fireworks were made by soldiers of the queen's guard and the gunners of Edinburgh and Stirling castles, including Michael Gardiner. John Chisholm, comptroller clerk of the royal artillery, arranged the firework display for the baptism. The preparations were expensive, and John had to send to the Queen twice for extra money. John's account for the event lists his ingredients, including, colophony, orpiment, quicksilver, Lombard paper, camphor, gum arabic, arrows and dozens of small pottery vessels. The fireworks were made in Leith at the King's Wark and shipped to Stirling in great secrecy, carried to the castle at the dead of night "for feir of knowledge thairof". Chisholm also arranged the making of costumes used by soldiers in the pageant of an assault on a mock castle. To perfect the costume for the teams of warriors some blue fabric had to be dyed black. Two tailors in Stirling adjusted the costumes to fit the soldiers before the performance. Four soldiers were provided with costumes and wigs made of lamb's fleece to act as "Moors", to masquerade as African people. The carpenter James Reid built the mock fort beside the churchyard of the Holy Rude Kirk, in the area known as the valley, from fir spars and boards shipped from Leith.

The French ambassador, Jean, Count de Brienne, arrived in Edinburgh on 2 November 1566 and was lodged in Henry Kinloch's house in the Canongate near Holyrood Palace. He visited Craigmillar Castle to meet Mary on 20 November. Mary had been ill, and was convalescing at Craigmillar, and courtiers including John Bellenden heard that the baptism would go ahead on 10 December. The baptism was delayed by a week. Brienne went to Stirling on 12 December, escorted by George Seton, 7th Lord Seton. James Melville of Halhill claimed that he was a "simple man" and "no courtier", suggesting by this that Mary's diplomatic policy was towards England.

According to Anthony Standen, a servant of Darnley, Margaret Douglas (Darnley's mother) sent a bearing cloth for the baptism, and a gift of marmalade and sweetmeats, a "bancketynge dysshe of sugare and marmelade". Elizabeth I was displeased by the publication in Paris of Latin verses written by Patrick Adamson. The verses suggested that Prince James was heir to the thrones of Scotland, England, and Ireland. She instructed the diplomats attending the baptism to complain to Queen Mary about this "small trifling book".

== The baptism ==
A proclamation was made at Stirling on 14 December 1566 for keeping "good and quiet order" during the resort of the nobility and ambassadors to the town. No one was allowed to carry arms such as "culverins, dags, pistolats" or swords and daggers. The captain and constable of castle were authorized to search and confiscate weapons and imprison offenders.

The baptism ceremony was held at Stirling on 17 December. In the chapel, Brienne (who represented Charles IX of France) passed the infant James to Lady Jean Stewart, Countess of Argyll (who represented Elizabeth I as her "deputy"). She held him at the font. The name and titles proclaimed were, "Charles James, James Charles, Prince and Steward of Scotland, Duke of Rothesay, Earl of Carrick, Lord of the Isles, and Baron of Renfrew".

There was a torchlit banquet, described in the chronicle called the Diurnal of Occurrents, followed by "dancing and playing in abundance". The final act of the day was a masque involving men on hobby horses singing in Italian.

== Darnley and Bothwell ==
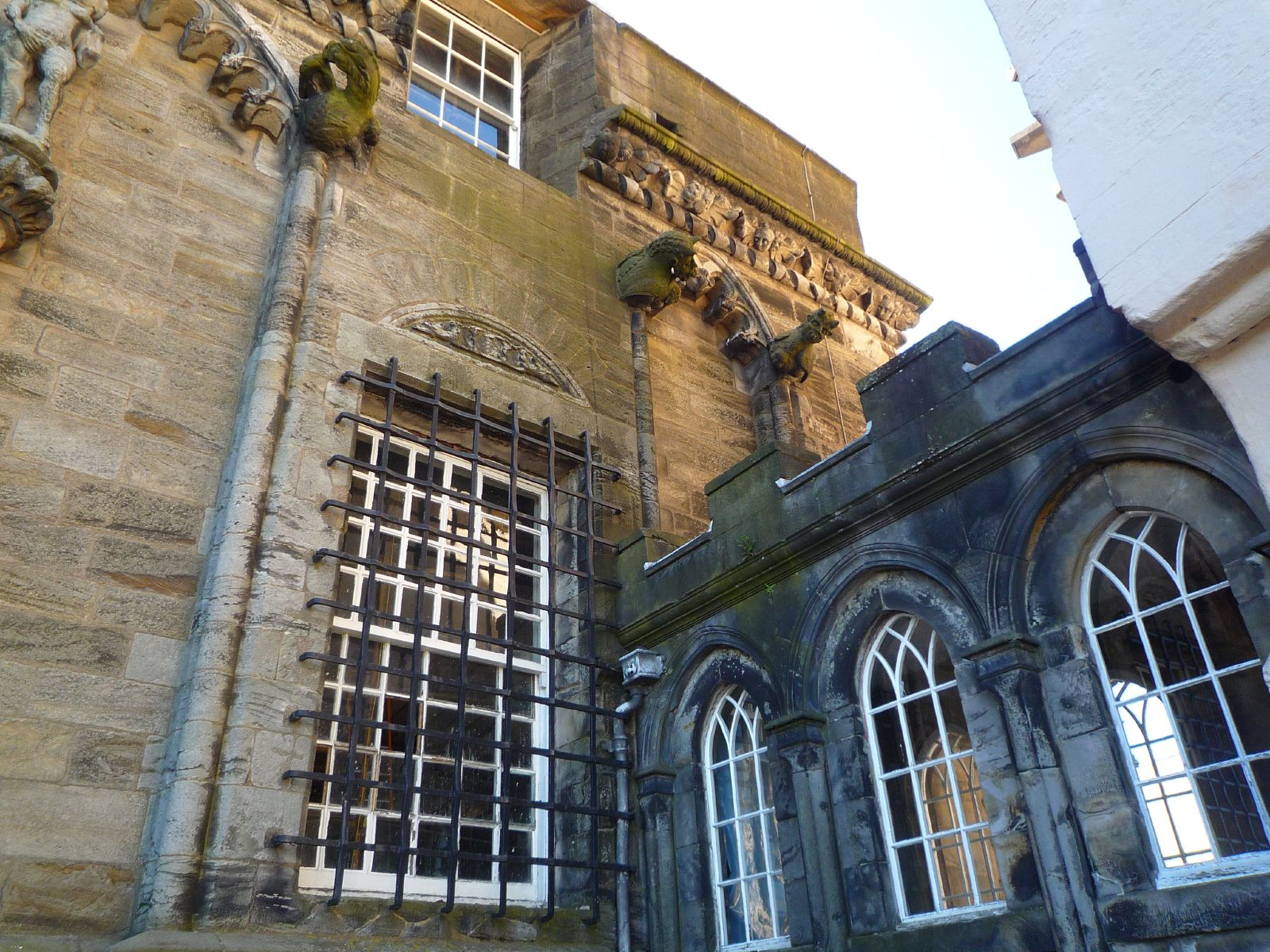
Mary was said to have built a passage between the Great Hall and Palace for the baptism.

James's father, Lord Darnley, was estranged from the Queen. Mary and Bothwell were said to have had him moved from William Bell's house in Stirling to an obscure lodging in the castle on 5 December. He stayed privately in the castle and did not attend the events, and the French diplomat Philibert du Croc (who represented the Duke of Savoy for the occasion) was instructed not to speak to him by Charles IX. On the day of the baptism du Croc sent a message to Darnley that if he came to his room, he would exit by the other door.

According to the accusations against Mary known as the "Book of Articles" or "Hay's Articles", she had ordered a passage to be built between her chamber in the "new work" or palace to the Great Hall where Bothwell lodged. Her building work was unfinished. This "passage" was later replaced by the neo-gothic bridge between the palace and great hall.

== Hunting, fireworks and a mock castle ==
George Buchanan's masque refers to hunting boar and deer as well as provisions and produce more generally and may have served to set the scene and as an introduction to a hunt held on the following morning. A rare white wild bull was hunted in the Park of the castle on 18 December, and in these events Mary may have been portrayed as Diana the huntress. The Park was known for its herd of white cattle.

On 19 December there were fireworks directed by John Chisholm and the gunners Charles Bordeaux and James Hector. The pageant consisted of an assault on a mock castle. Fifteen soldiers dressed as landsknechts, moors, horsemen, and devils, armed with two cannons, as well as four Highlanders dressed as wildmen carrying fireworks, fought within and around the fort.

== Dancers with tails at the feast ==
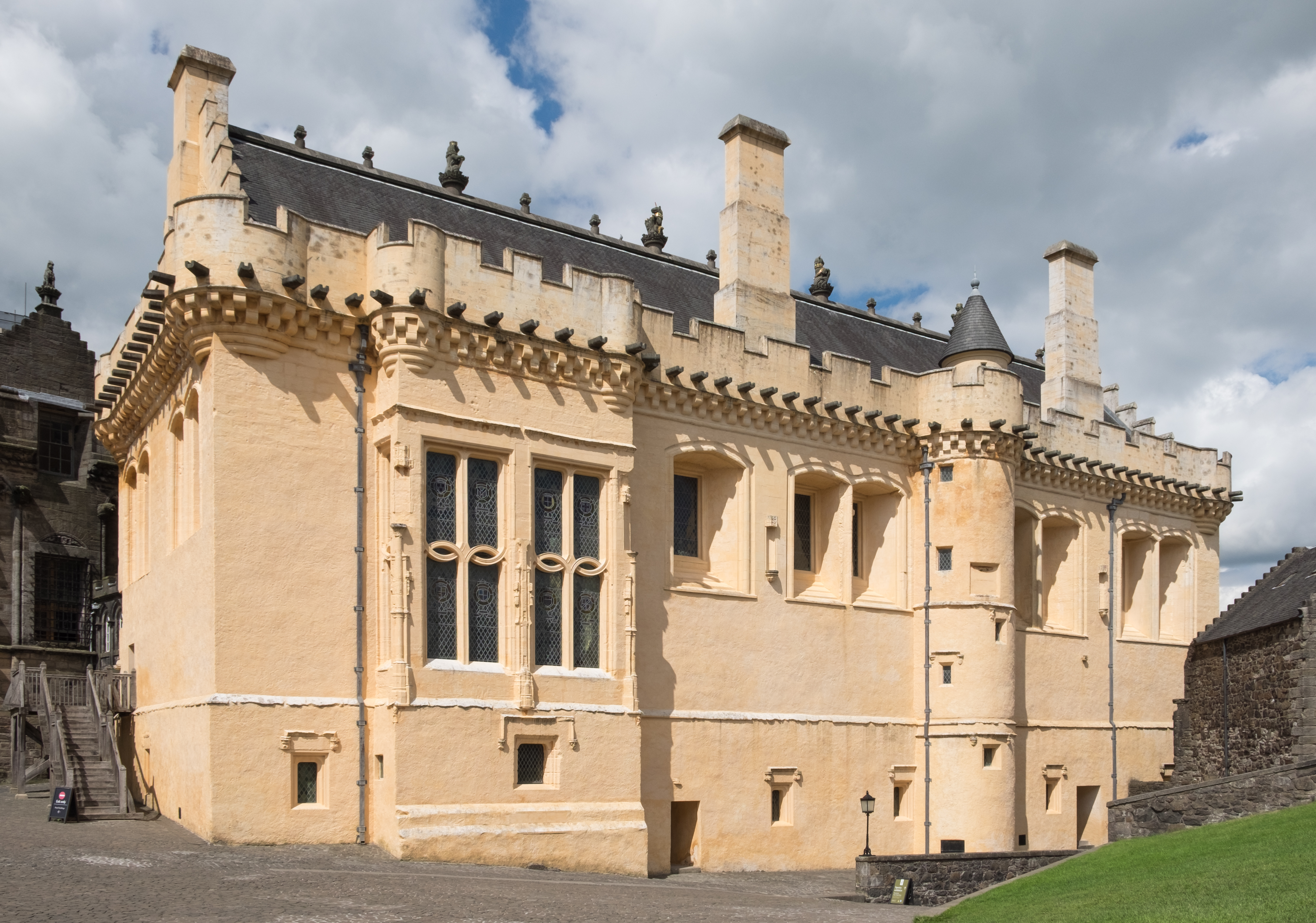
Banquets were served in the Great Hall accompanied by elaborate renaissance theatre

On 19 December 1566 there was a feast and entertainment in the Great Hall of the castle. The food was brought from the kitchens by a procession led by musicians followed by the three Masters of the Household, the Laird of Findlater, Francisco de Busso, and Gilbert Balfour.

James Melville of Halhill wrote that Bastian Pagez was responsible for an entertainment in the Great Hall of Stirling Castle on 19 December which offended the English guests at the baptism. Mary and thirty guests sat at a round table like King Arthur's at the head of the hall. The courses of the dinner were brought up the hall on a moving table, with twelve men dressed as satyrs, with long tails, carrying lighted torches. In their other hand the satyrs carried whips to clear the way in front. When the table reached the stage, the satyrs passed their torches to bystanders. Then six servers dressed as nymphs who had been seated on the moving table, passed the food to the satyrs, who brought the dishes up to the round table on the stage.

Meanwhile, courtiers costumed as nymphs and satyrs sang Latin verses specially written by George Buchanan in honour of the food and hosts as the "gift of the offering of rustic gods to James and his mother". The Latin title is Pompae Deorum Rusticorum. The parts of the song were alternately given to the satyrs, nereids, fauns, and naiads who addressed the Queen and Prince, and it was concluded by characters representing the Orkney Islands. The nereids had used compasses to navigate their way to Scotland following the Great Bear from the New World. They represented Indigenous peoples of the Americas.

When the satyrs first wagged their tails, the English guests took it as reference to an old saying that Englishmen had tails. This story of English tails was first set down in the Middle Ages by the chronicle writers William of Malmesbury, Wace, and Layamon in his Brut. The origin was a legend that Saint Austin cursed the Kentish men of Rochester to have rayfish tails, and afterwards they were called muggles. Polydore Vergil had more recently published a version of the legend, writing that the curse applied to the descendants of people from Strood who had cut off the tail of Thomas Becket's horse. From this ancient story it had become proverbial in Europe that all Englishmen had secret tails.

Melville criticised the diplomatic skills of the guests for taking offence at this, saying they should have pretended not to see the joke. Some of the English guests, including Christopher Hatton, sat down behind the high table to face away from the spectacle, and the Queen and the English ambassador, the Earl of Bedford had to smooth things over. Melville said that Hatton told him he would have stabbed Bastian for the offence, done because Mary, for once, showed more favour to Englishmen rather than the French.

The moving table or stage was drawn up the hall four times for four courses, led by the satyrs. Each time its decorative theme was renewed. During the fourth course a child actor descended from the roof in a globe. The stage mechanism broke during the fifth course.

== Diplomats and gifts ==
Francis Russell, 2nd Earl of Bedford, represented Queen Elizabeth at the baptism and was guest of honour at the banquet and masque. It was said that Agnes Keith, Countess of Moray, welcomed him to Stirling with a kiss, whether he was willing or not. Bedford refused to go in the chapel at the baptism, and it was arranged that Jean Stewart, Countess of Argyll went in his place as the "Queen's Majesty's deputy", and he gave her a ring with ruby, according to Queen Elizabeth's instructions. Mary gave Bedford a "very proper" gold chain set with pearls, diamonds, and rubies. Bedford, assisted by John Tamworth, was asked to raise some issues with Mary, including the ratification of the Treaty of Edinburgh. Elizabeth decided not to send Tamworth to the baptism.

As a gift, Bedford brought a gold font "curiously wrought and enamelled" supplied or made by the goldsmiths Robert Brandon and Affabel Partridge. Weighing 333 ounces, it was too small for Prince James at six months and Bedford was encouraged to say it would be suitable for Mary's next infant. Thieves planned to hijack the convoy near Doncaster and steal it. The font was sent to John Acheson at the Scottish mint in May 1567 to be made into coins for Mary and Bothwell before Carberry. The Confederate Lords arrived in Edinburgh and prevented this.

According to James Melville of Halhill, Mary gave Christopher Hatton a chain of pearls and a diamond ring, a ring and a chain with her miniature picture to George Carey, and gold chains to Mr Lignish (Ralph Liggens or Lygon), a friend of the Duke of Norfolk, and to five English gentlemen of "quality". She received a necklace of pearl and rubies and earrings from the French ambassador, the Count de Brienne, otherwise described as a "carcanet of fine work". In January 1567 Ubertino Solaro, Sieur de Moretta, the ambassador of the Duke of Savoy, who was late for the baptism, gave Mary a fan with jewelled feathers.

== Aftermath ==
After the baptism, James Stewart, 1st Earl of Moray, took the Earl of Bedford on a tour of Fife. They visited St Andrews and Hallyards, a house of William Kirkcaldy of Grange On Christmas Eve, Mary issued pardons or remissions to those accused of being present and conspirators at the murder of David Rizzio. She went to Drummond Castle and to Tullibardine Castle for New Year, the home of William Murray, without Lord Darnley who went to Glasgow.

The wardrobe servant Servais de Condé recorded that a piece of large leaf verdure tapestry, originally from Huntly Castle, and a small Turkish carpet were lost from Stirling Castle, and a tapestry from the suite of "Rabbit Hunt" from Linlithgow Palace, at the time of the baptism.

In 1568 Ralph Lignish or Liggons was involved in the Duke of Norfolk's discussions at Hampton Court with Moray and John Lesley about him marrying Mary, Queen of Scots, which led to his execution. He may have been the Duke's messenger at the Stirling baptism, said to have told Mary that in the event of Elizabeth having no heir, "he and diverse others of the principalest of the nobility were to stand for her and hers". According to Robert Melville, Norfolk sent him to Mary in captivity at Lochleven Castle, to advise her not to abdicate in favour of her son. He went into exile in France. Mary wrote to Liggons from Chartley, twenty years later.

== More masques at the Stuart court ==
In January 1581 James Stewart, the son of James Stewart, 1st Lord Doune, married Elizabeth Stewart, the elder daughter of Regent Moray. The wedding was celebrated on 31 January in Fife with a tournament of "running at the ring" and James VI took part. Two day after the party came to Leith, where a water pageant culminated with a theatrical assault on a Papal Castel Sant'Angelo, built on boats on the water of Leith.

The eldest son of James VI and Anne of Denmark, Prince Henry, was baptised at Stirling in 1594. The celebrations involved a tournament of running at the ring in fancy dress, desserts and fruits served by six ladies from a moving stage drawn by a "Moor", and a model ship loaded with fish made from sugar.
