= Rockers (royal courts) =

Rockers were gentlewomen employed at royal courts and aristocratic households as attendants to infants, whose duties included rocking the cradle. In medieval England, a French term "berceresse" or "bercere" was used for this role, or the English words "bersatrix" or "rockster". The employment of rockers was noted by an English author Walter of Bibbesworth in his Treatise. An ordinance for the household of Henry VII of England includes "four chamberers, called rockers". The rockers gave oaths of loyalty and service to the Lord Chamberlain as members of the royal household.

== Tudor and Stuart courts ==
Henry VII employed Agnes Butler and Emily or Evelyn Hobbes as rockers for Arthur, Prince of Wales at Farnham Castle. His nurse was Katharine Gibbs. The rockers appointed for the cradle of Margaret Tudor at Richmond Palace were Anne Mayland and Margaret Troughton, assisted by Alice Bywymble. In March 1503, Elizabeth of York paid allowances to three rockers Beatrix Bradowe, Emme Bragges, and Alice Williams, who served the three children of Catherine of York,

The illegitimate children of James IV of Scotland were nursed at Stirling Castle in 1502, and Andrew Aytoun paid £3 Scots to three rockers who "kepit the barnes" for their Whitsunday fees. Margaret Tudor married James IV in 1503, and the four rockers of her children were paid 54 shillings yearly, were given gowns of French tawny fabric, and had New Year's Day gifts of money. The six "rokkaris" and nurses of James V (and his late brother the Duke of Ross), including Cristeane Cokburn, were given lengths of Rouen russet fabric for their gowns in March 1516, and velvet to border the gowns. Their annual wage or fee was £4 Scots.

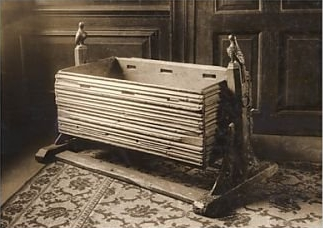
15th-century cradle said to have been a perquisite given to a rocker, Royal Collection.

The rockers for Princess Mary, daughter of Henry VIII and Catherine of Aragon in 1516 were Margery Parker, Anne Bright, Ellen Hutton, and Margaret Cousine. Their quarterly wage was 20 shillings. Margery Parker may perhaps have been the daughter of Henry Parker, 10th Baron Morley who later married John Shelton. A "Mrs Parker" in Mary's household in 1525, and listed as a chamberer in 1533, may have been the former rocker, or another daughter of Lord Morley. Alice Parker was one of Mary's chamberers in 1525.

In 1519, Cardinal Wolsey sent a gift of £100 to the ambassador in France, Thomas Boleyn, for the nurse and the four rockers of Henry the son of Francis I of France in June 1519. Princess Mary gave gilt spoons as New Year's Day gifts to the four rockers of Prince Edward, these included Jane Russell and Bridget Forster. This Jane Russell may have been the chamberer and gentlewoman of the privy chamber of Mary and Elizabeth who died in 1558.

Hans Holbein and Cornelis Hayes were commissioned to make a jewelled silver cradle for Anne Boleyn's child. The epitaph carved on Blanche Parry's monument at St Faith's Bacton, Herefordshire, seems to alludes to her role as a rocker for Elizabeth I, or presence in her nursery, "Whyllste that my Mystres lyvde in womans state: Whose cradell sawe I rockte". Later, in August 1582, Blanche Parry petitioned on behalf of Miles Pendred of Northbourne, whose wife Anne (or Elizabeth) Lewin had been one of the queen's nurses. Parry may have gained employment at court by the influence of her aunt Blanche Milborne. The careers and social status of other 16th-century rockers and nursery workers may be more difficult to trace.

James V and Mary of Guise had a son James, Duke of Rothesay whose nursery was in St Andrews. The "Lady Mistress" was in charge and the treasurer's accounts include purchases of textiles for her. In July 1540, she bought sheets and blankets for two beds for the "ladyis that kepis and rokis my lord Prince". The Lady Mistress also made shirts for King James, as did another courtier Katherine Bellenden. The four rockers had the same wage or fee as the laundrywoman. A new cradle was made by Andrew Mansioun, an earlier royal cradle had been constructed in 1512 for use at Linlithgow Palace. An inventory made in 1543 includes the late Prince's cradle blankets of new fustian, plaid, and thick white, with a cradle covering embroidered with silk and gold with silk finges, and pieces of red velvet used to dress the cradle.

=== Mary, Queen of Scots and James VI at Stirling ===
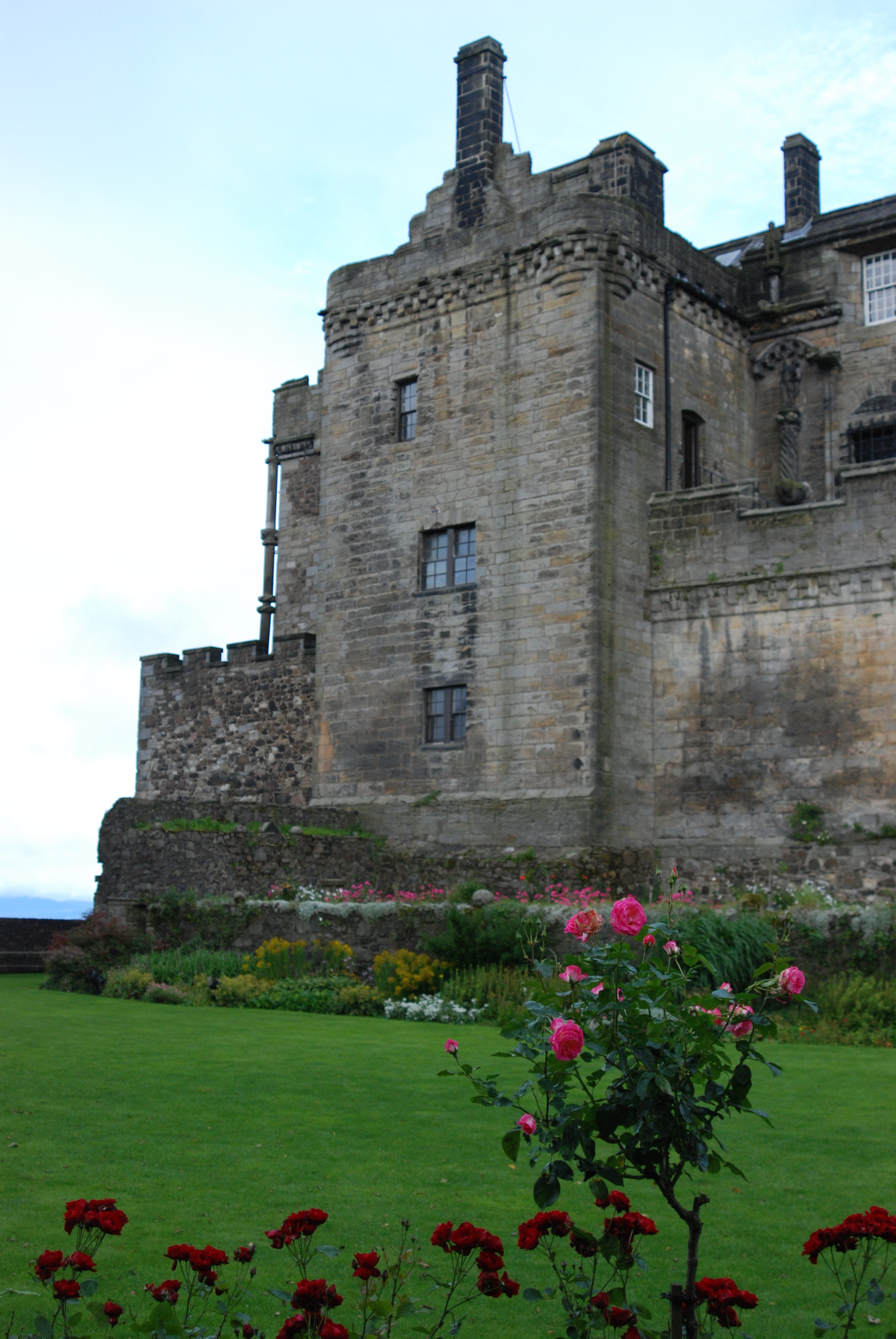
James VI and I and his son Prince Henry were nursed in the Prince's Tower at Stirling Castle

Details of the nursery of Mary, Queen of Scots do not appear in the treasurer's accounts, her nurse was Jean Sinclair and her laundry woman Margaret Balcolmy. According to a household roll of Mary of Guise, there were two older or senior rockers and three younger rockers. A man was paid two shillings to transport the cradle from Linlithgow to Stirling in July 1543.

Margaret Houston was Mary's midwife in 1565. In 1567, at Stirling Castle, the "rokkeris" who took turns to rock the cradle of James VI and I included Jean Oliphant, Lady Kippenross (possibly Jean Stirling), Jean Cromby or Abercrombie, and Catherine Murray, all regarded as members of the lesser nobility, and Christian Stewart (a daughter of John Stewart, Commendator of Coldingham and granddaughter of James V). A canopy of blue "plaiding" was made, either to cover the rockers on duty or for their beds. A bed with a plaiding canopy and cover was provided in Queen's chamber for her maidens of honour. The nurse Helen Littil and the rocker Jane Oliphant gave psalm and prayer books to the infant king.

According to the ordinance for the household at Stirling, the rockers dined with two women, Alison Sinclair and Grissell Gray (a daughter of the King's nurse Helen Littil), who looked after the king's clothes and linen. Annabell Murray, Countess of Mar, head of the household at Stirling was given £500 Scots to pay the rockers. When one of the King's rockers married a royal servant Robert Porterfield (died 1591), the Regent James Stewart, 1st Earl of Moray granted a dowry or "tocher good" of £333 Scots, paid to Porterfield by the argentier Alexander Durham. Porterfield called one of his daughters "Annabell" after the Countess of Mar.

Alison Sinclair and Catherine Murray both received belated payments for their service as rockers in March 1579, and in 1602 Annabell Murray bequeathed a pair of bracelets to the Laird of Kippenross.

=== Family of Anne of Denmark ===
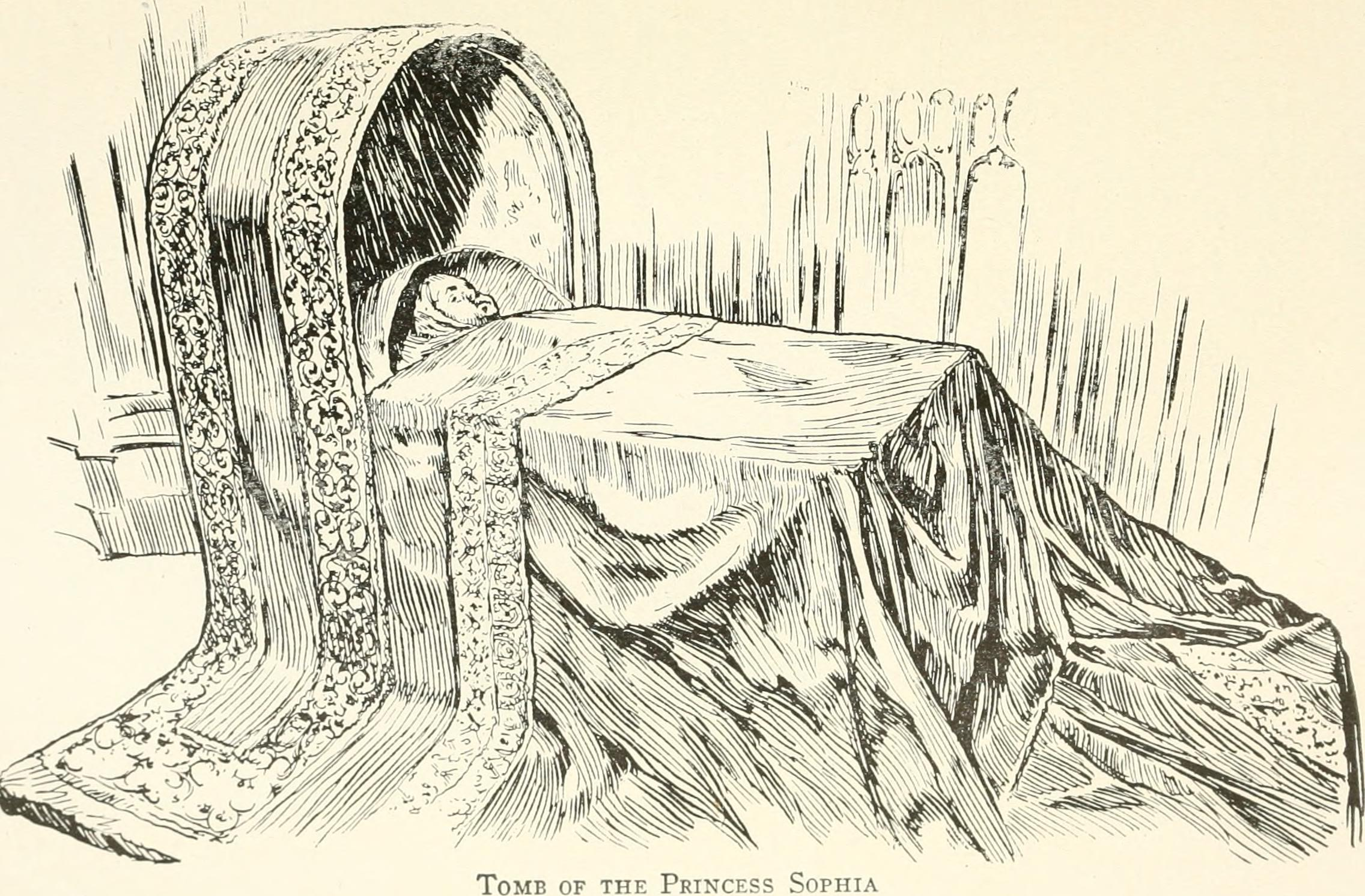
The tomb of Sophia Stuart (died 1606) at Westminster Abbey was modelled as a cradle with a hood, draped with rich fabric.

In 1594, there were four rockers at Stirling for Prince Henry, Margaret Kinross (perhaps a daughter of Lady Kippenross), Jonet Bruce, Margaret Cunningham, and Helen Stewart. The nurse and the four rockers minded Prince Henry in the Chapel Royal during his baptism. A cradle said to have been Prince Henry's survives, an heirloom in the family of Annabell Murray, Countess of Mar. Sometimes said to have been the cradle of James VI, it moves on curved rockers unlike the swinging Tudor cradle.

Princess Elizabeth was born at Dunfermline Palace. When she was baptised at Holyrood Palace in November 1596, she was held by Beatrix Ruthven. Edinburgh's burgh council gave her nurses, rockers, midwives, and porters 38 five pound pieces amongst them, a gift which cost the town £190 Scots.

A new nursery was set up by William Schaw at Dalkeith Palace for Anne of Denmark's daughter Margaret in 1598, with a chair for the "Mistress nurse" and four stools for the rockers. Subsequently, Margaret joined Elizabeth at Linlithgow Palace and Marion Hepburn and Christiane Scrimgeour were her rockers.

Beds were provided in advance of the birth of Charles at Dunfermline Palace for the "Maistres and rokker", the head of the household Margaret Stewart, Mistress of Ochiltree and Charles's lead rocker Marion Hepburn. Hepburn was given a reward of £166 Scots in December 1604.

Six rockers appointed for Mary Stuart at Greenwich Palace in 1605 petitioned Anne of Denmark for pensions of £30 a year after the infant died.
