= Jean de Compiègne =

French tailor (??–1581)

Jean de Compiègne or Jehan de Conpiegne (died 1581) was a French tailor who served Mary, Queen of Scots, in Scotland and England. He is frequently mentioned in her accounts and in her letters. His name appears in various spellings in Scottish records, including "Jean Decumpanze". He was also known as "Jehan Poulliet", and signed his name as "Jehan Poullyet".

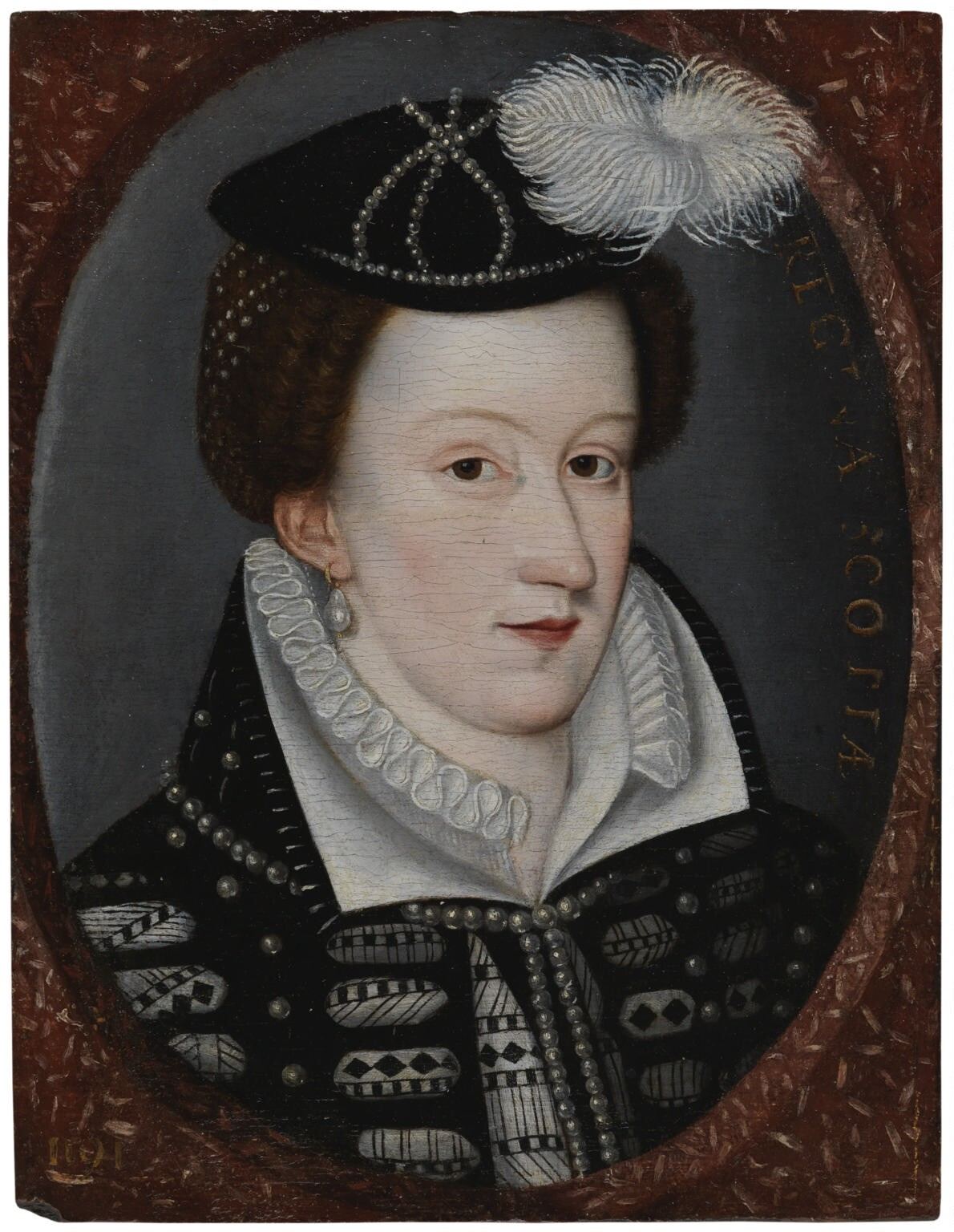
Mary, Queen of Scots in the 1560s

== Scotland ==
In Scotland, Jean de Compiègne was paid a wage for making the queen's clothes and for supplying and preparing her silk thread for embroidery and other textile craft materials, for "facon d'habitz et soye à coudre et crochetz". He worked with Jacques de Senlis or Seulis, another tailor and valet of the royal wardrobe, to make masque costumes for Mary and her ladies in waiting. Senlis, the town, is between Compiègne and Paris.

Work by Jean de Compiègne was recorded in French in Mary's wardrobe account by Servais de Condé, the varlet of the wardrobe. One of the first recorded items, in January 1564, was a length of canvas to wrap a gift (presumably of clothing) to be sent to Madeleine of Savoy, Madame de Montmorency, in France. In February 1564, Jean added plumes or panaches to three of the queen's bonnets:

Plus a Jehan de Copiengne iij pannache assavoir deux de jes noyr pour metre sur le chappeaux pour la Royne.

More, to Jean de Compiègne, three plumes, that is to say, two panaches of black jay [feathers, or beads] to put on the bonnets of the queen.

In September 1564, Jean de Compiègne made black velvet gowns for the maids of honour, and a gown of black velvet for Mary, embroidered with pearls:

Plus a Jehan de Conpiengne xxij aulnes ung quinsiemme de veloux noyr pour fairre une robbe pour la Royne set en treussle de perlles.

More, to Jean de Compiègne, 22 ells and a fifth of black velvet to make a gown for the Queen dressed with pearls.

On one occasion, for a masque in February 1566, de Compiègne made costumes decorated with flames recycled from old cloth of gold cushion covers. The outfits were described as "male apparell", and during the performance the gentlewomen presented daggers to the French ambassador, Nicolas d'Angennes, seigneur de Rambouillet.

In March 1566, Jean de Compiègne made a silver headdress for Mary to wear at the Parliament of Scotland. He made clothes for the queen's entertainer or fool Nichola, and ruffs for Lord Darnley, and was supplied with gold thread for embroidery. Another tailor, William Hoppringle, made clothes for Darnley.

In July 1566 Jean de Compiègne made a gown of grosgrain taffeta banded with black velvet for Helen Littil, the nurse of Prince James, and in August 1566, he made a cover to wrap the Prince at his baptism at Stirling Castle from 10 ells of silver damask. After the ceremony, the fabric was used on a bed.

In February 1567, after the murder of Lord Darnley, he was paid under his other name "Johnne Powlet" for making a serge cloak and "devanter" skirt dressed with ribbons as part of Mary's black mourning clothes (possibly a riding outfit, the "devanter" can be identified as a "safeguard"). In March he made mourning clothes for Mary's pages and lackeys. The confession of the servant French Paris mentions the presence of a tailor with Bothwell at the Kirk o' Field and at Holyroodhouse on the day after the explosion, who was apparently Bothwell's tailor called Wilson.

=== Clothes and household service ===
In the Scottish royal household, Jean de Compiègne was a valet of the chamber. He was given clothes to wear in February 1566 and January 1567. The first list includes red and yellow items, according to a heading in the account this costume was for his lackey servant. At this time he was making clothes for the queen's pages and lackeys. The clothes in the second list were black and gray and include an "Almain" or German-style cloak. His servant boy was dressed in clothes of English blue woollen cloth. His wife, whose name was not recorded, was a servant in the queen's chamber, and they were both given linen at Easter. She does not seem to appear in the lists of the household known as the Estats.

In January 1567, an Italian in the queen's service, Joseph Lutyni, fled to Berwick-upon-Tweed, and he said he was pursued for a debt to the Queen's tailor of 30 crowns, probably meaning Jean de Compiègne, who is identified as the tailor in the Estat. A letter related to this affair mentions Lorenzo and Timothy Cagnioli, two Italian brothers and financiers who supplied fabrics to Mary.

== England ==
Jacques de Seulis or Senlis was listed as a tailor and groom of the wardrobe in Mary's household at Tutbury Castle in October 1569, and at Sheffield Castle in 1571. Jean de Compiègne intermittently served Mary in England. He was with Mary at Sheffield Manor Lodge in 1572, and drew up a shopping list of fabrics to be sourced in France by the diplomat Bertrand de Salignac de la Mothe-Fénelon.

In July 1574, hopeful of an audience at the English court, Mary asked her ally in France, the Archbishop of Glasgow, to send her coifs embroidered with gold and silver and the latest fashion in Italian ribbons and veils for her hair. She hoped that Jean de Compiègne would be able to come to her at Sheffield, and bring patterns and fabric samples, "patrons d'habits et eschantillons", as worn at the French court. Some of the fabrics were to be gifts for Elizabeth I.

In July 1579, items sent to Mary from Paris were addressed to Jacques de Senlis as her valet. The consignment included estate accounts and ledgers, two watches, lace, ruffs, bands, and two pounds of laundry starch.

After Jean de Compiègne died, in February 1581 Mary hoped to employ Jacques de Senlis as her tailor, and she wanted the French ambassador Michel de Castelnau to obtain a passport for him and chests of new clothes made to her measurements. Mary's letters show that Jean de Compiègne and Jacques de Senlis visited her in England and made her clothes in France. She wrote to the Archbishop of Glasgow in France:

Cause the clothes to be made by Jacques de Senlis, whom I have resolved to employ in the room of the late John de Compiègne; and with this view, I made him take measure of all my dresses (prendre mesure des tous mes accoustremens) on his last journey hither

Jacques de Senlis had dressed Mary's dolls in Scotland, possibly to model new styles. In later years, the aged master of Mary's wardrobe in England, Balthazar Hully was served by an English tailor, Robert Mooreton. The French wardrobe staff remaining with her till the end included Balthazar, master or tailor of the wardrobe, and Charles Plouvart the embroiderer. There were three English laundry women from Derbyshire; Elizabeth Butler, Alice Sharpe, and Alice Forster. Alice Sharpe had married the "cocher" or coachman, Roger Sharpe, who was from Sheffield. The Earl of Shrewsbury had recruited Robert Mooreton. He was injured in a fight at Chartley in June 1586. Amias Paulet's inventory of Mary's possessions includes some unused cloth Mooreton had intended for Easter Maundy in 1587.
