= Servais de Condé =

French servant (1561–1574)

Servais de Condé or Condez (employed 1561–1574) was a French servant at the court of Mary Queen of Scots, in charge of her wardrobe and the costume for masques performed at the Scottish royal court.

== Varlet of the Wardrobe ==
He was usually referred to as Servais or Servie in Scottish records. Although he is sometimes described as Mary's chamberlain, records call him a varlet, "virlote in her grace chalmer". He was also paid for his role as a "varlet of the wardrobe", and managed the queen's stock of rich silks and fabrics used for costume and interior decoration. The other varlets were Toussaint Courcelles and John Balfour. Angell Marie was a varlet of wardrobe in 1565.

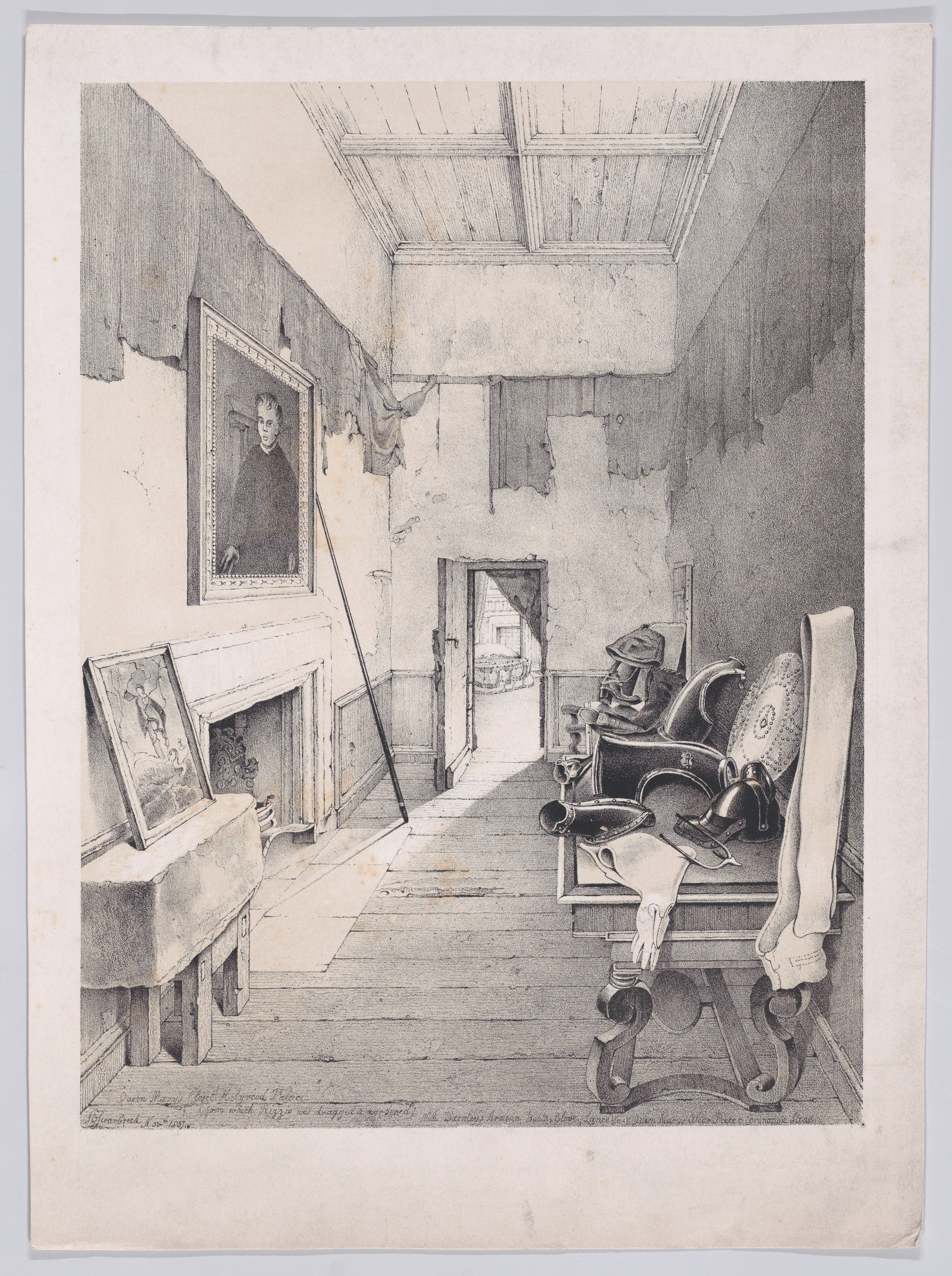
19th-century drawing of the cabinet which Servais de Condé decorated for Mary, Queen of Scots at Holyrood Palace

Soon after Mary's arrival in Scotland, in September 1561, Servais de Condé worked in Holyrood Palace lining a cabinet room for the queen with 26 ells of a fabric called "Paris Green". The Italian cloth merchant and financier Timothy Cagnioli advanced £500 Scots for the project. The English diplomat Thomas Randolph mentions this cabinet as a space to which he was not admitted, where the queen withdrew to write letters and to weep. Randolph instead met the queen and her council in her bed chamber. Servais made furnishings for the bedchamber, including black cushions, a black tablecloth, and a suite of seat furniture in black velvet in November 1562. According to Randolph and Bedford's description of the murder of David Rizzio, the cabinet was 12 feet square, furnished with a reposing bed and a table seating three.

In September and November 1561 Servais made inventories of Mary's wardrobe and the goods of Mary of Guise with her lady-in-waiting Mademoiselle Rallay. These inventories were later annotated by Mr John Wood, the secretary of Regent Moray. Servais made an inventory of the altar cloths and vestments from the Chapel Royal at Stirling Castle in January 1562, which had been transferred to his keeping at Holyrood along with a parchment Missal and an Antiphonal.

Servais was made keeper of Holyroodhouse by privy seal letter on 20 January 1565 during Mary's intended journey to Aberdeen taking responsibility from Giovanni Francisco de Busso, an Italian who was supervisor of royal buildings. Busso had joined the household of Mary of Guise in 1554.

In September 1566, Servais sent costume to Stirling as a wedding gift for Nichola or Nicholas Wardlaw, known as Madame Torrie, one of the queen's gentlewomen. The list of materials survives in French and in Scots, the gown was made of 11 French measure ells of "violat velvote" or vellours viollet. Her white satin sleeves and skirt front, the grand manches and davant, were decorated with narrow gold braids, petite natte d'or.

Servais was involved in the decoration of Stirling Castle for the baptism of Prince James. He kept a memoir written in French of silk textiles and other fabrics used by Mary or given as gifts, which runs from 1 September 1561 to May 1567. It includes details of colour and fabric. He supervised the dismantling and refashioning of beds confiscated from Huntly Castle.

Servais wrote a note of the things destroyed in the explosion at the Kirk o'Field, where they had been sent for the use of Lord Darnley in February 1567. These included a suite of tapestries from Huntly Castle. The servant known as "French Paris" helped Servais at the Kirk o' Field, and the day after Darnley's death came to queen's bedchamber at Holyrood to hang the bed with mourning black and light candles in the "ruelle", a space between the bed and the wall. Servais's note of the furnishings at the Kirk o'Field is frequently quoted by historians to comment on the chain of events leading up to the murder, some arguing that the lodging was furnished in a hurry, or with George Buchanan inferring the queen's guilt from the substitution of a lesser green bed for a bed with rich black curtains.

== A queen deposed ==
On 10 July 1567 Mary's opponents, the Confederate lords, ordered him to surrender to silverware in his keeping for coining to the Master of Mint John Acheson. This included a silver gilt nef or ship for the queen's table. On 25 July Servais was asked to produce the crown sceptre and sword, the Honours of Scotland for the coronation of James VI following Mary's abdication.

Subsequently, Servais sent clothes and sewing thread for embroidery to Mary in her prison at Lochleven Castle. On 3 September 1567 Mary wrote to Robert Melville to ask Servais, her "concierge" to send silk thread and sewing gold and silver, and two pairs of sheets with black thread for embroidery, and needles and a mould (cushion) for net-work called "rasour" or "réseau", from the royal wardrobe, with dried plums and pears. Some of the request was fulfilled by new purchases by Regent Moray in October. Servais, described in the accounts as "the Quenis grace chalmer child" made clothes, or supervised the making of clothes for Mary, especially linen shirts called "sarks" and also other items made of velvet. A memorandum written in French of further textiles and thread sent to Mary at Lochleven, Carlisle and Bolton is associated with Servais by historians including Margaret Swain, but does not feature his name.

Servais packed and transported two beds from Linlithgow Palace to James VI at Stirling Castle in November 1567. When English soldiers came to Scotland in 1570, William Maitland of Lethington and William Kirkcaldy of Grange ordered Servais de Condé to transport the tapestry and furnishings of Holyroodhouse to Edinburgh Castle for safe keeping.

Mary wrote from Sheffield Castle on 18 July 1574 to the Archbishop of Glasgow, recommending her old and faithful servant Servais de Condé, who was not paid his due from her French estates, and she made an order for his pension to be paid. She wanted Servais to go to Scotland and take inventories of her furniture and discover its current keepers. She would like to maintain his son-her-law in Scotland, meaning probably Benoît Garrouste (see below).

== Masque costumes and mummery in Scotland ==
On 15 November 1569 Servais handed the library of Mary Queen of Scots, cloths used in her chapel, and masque costumes called "dansyne cleiss" and "maskeine cleis" to Moray's agents. At the Scottish court masques with music and dancing were performed in elaborate and unusual costumes at the weddings of leading courtiers, like that of James Stewart, 1st Lord Doune and Margaret Campbell, sister of the Earl of Argyll at Castle Campbell on 10 January 1563. The masque involved courtiers and musicians disguised as shepherds in white silk taffeta.

The last event of the wedding celebrations for Agnes Keith and the Earl of Mar in February 1562 was a supper in Cardinal Beaton's palace at the corner of the Cowgate and Blackfriar's Wynd, and afterwards the young men of the town came in procession, in "convoy" to greet her, some in masque costume in "merschance" or "mumchance", a Scottish form of mummery. They escorted the bride back to Holyroodhouse. Some masque costume for the ladies of the court in red and white taffeta was prepared by the queen's tailor, Jacques de Soulis.

The tailor Jehan de Compiegne made costumes from orange "changing" or shot taffeta for a masque in February 1564 at Holyrood, with a smaller costume in the same fabric for a young girl at court. The English ambassador Thomas Randolph said these Shrove Tide banquets were great as those given at a royal wedding. The queen ladies wore white and black at one banquet, and verses were recited as the courses were brought in by gentlemen wearing black and white. A unicorn horn was displayed on the sideboard.

The French ambassador Rambouillet was entertained at Holyrood Palace on 11 February 1566 by Mary, Queen of Scots and Lord Darnley in "maskrie and mumschance" during which the queen and her ladies were dressed in men's apparel. The queen's tailor Jehan de Compiegne made six costumes decorated with flames made of cloth of gold reused from old cushion covers. During the masque the queen's ladies presented 8 Scottish dirks or daggers to the French guests, with embroidered black velvet scabbards.

Such frivolity was subsequently denounced by John Knox, and the poet Richard Maitland of Lethington wrote against skipping in the street and "merschance" or "mumschansis" as likely to damage a young woman's reputation. In January 1582 an Edinburgh teacher John Gilleis was forbidden to "pass in mumschance after supper to make plays or use suchlike vanities". A poem copied by Lilias Murray mentions "The masked mumchance of mischief." James IV of Scotland had a "mummyng gown" in January 1506, of grey cloth bordered with fox fur. Mary, Queen of Scots and her ladies also wore costume as a disguise, as the wives of ordinary burgesses of Edinburgh, women of lower status, on Easter Monday 1565, or as men.

Servais' list of masque clothes, which exists in two versions, includes several "coats" meaning the lightweight costumes called "play coats" at the Scottish court, and mentioned in the accounts of James V in January 1540. One was of blue satin decorated with "toig" or tinsel stars, five of crimson satin, three of green velvet trimmed with yellow with yellow sleeves and bodices, with two other pairs of green and yellow coats, two coats of white taffeta with blue sleeves and bodice, six coats of yellow satin lined with silver, and several other coats. There was also a hood of red and white taffeta, sewn with "shakers". Servais' wife had taken two of these coats, one of red, the other of black chamlet, possibly as gifts from the queen. This inventory may represent the costume from several masques, which involved pairs of dancers, and larger groups, dressed alike in teams. Servais' wardrobe account also mention masque costumes for two French courtiers or royal servants, Michelet and Mernard.

The masques at the baptism of James VI at Stirling Castle in December 1566 involved fireworks and mock sieges. Costumes for the soldiers were bought by John Chisholm. Four Highland men's costumes were made from goat's skins. Outfits were made for four German soldiers or landsquenets, four Africans noted as the "Morres", four horsemen, and three devils, who fought with the Highland men. A tailor in Stirling modified the play clothes to fit the soldiers.

James VI continued this masque tradition, having a masque at Christmas time in 1579 when his violers were dressed in red and yellow taffeta, with "touke of silver", and play swords and daggers. James VI and Anne of Denmark attended and performed in masques at weddings in the early 1590s, appearing in lightweight taffeta costume with gold and silver "tock" at the weddings of Lilias Murray and John Grant of Freuchie at Tullibardine, and Marie Stewart and the Earl of Mar at Alloa. Special lightweight clothes of taffeta and satin were also worn by those fighting their accusers in public single combats, in December 1596 Adam Bruntfield and James Carmichael, son of Sir John Carmichael, fought in single combat on Cramond Island, one dressed in blue, and one in red, with an audience of 5,000.

== Family ==
Servais' family was involved in practical textile work in the royal wardrobe. In September 1570 the passment (trimming) worker Benneth Garrust described as Servais' nephew completed a canopy called a "paile" for James VI of Scotland to use during the visit of the English ambassador. Benneth Garrust, known at the "Frenche pasmentier", became the keeper of the Scottish Royal tapestry collection in Edinburgh castle.

In March 1567 Benoist Garroust was the executor of a French bookbinder working in Edinburgh, Jhonn du Moullings. In the household list of that year, he was described as a "gens de mestier: passmentier".

Servais' wife's name is not recorded, although she worked in the wardrobe at Holyroodhouse. Mary gave her an old black velvet cloak and a black damask gown lacking sleeves that had belonged to Mary of Guise in July 1565. In 1573 James Sandilands, 1st Lord Torphichen described how she and Benoist had furnished a room for him in Holyrood Palace with some tapestries and a bed recovered from Hamilton.

Servais and his family returned to France, as Mary's letter of 1574 suggests. As late as July 1579 the Privy Council became aware of a chest in the possession of George Lord Seton containing clothes, textiles and two beds belonging to Mary which Servais had entrusted to him.
