= Ralph Lygon =

Ralph Liggons or Lygon (1540-1619) was an English Catholic involved in conspiracies and a supporter of Mary, Queen of Scots.

== Family background ==
He was a member of the Worcestershire Lygon family, a son of William Lygon (died 1567) and his wife Eleanor Denys. His brother Richard (died 1584) was head of the family, based at Madresfield Court, his brother Roger Lygon was a Gentleman Usher to Mary I, and his nephew William Lygon was a Member of Parliament. Several contemporary records include his surname written as "Liggons" or "Ligons". These spelling are preferred by historians.

== Career ==
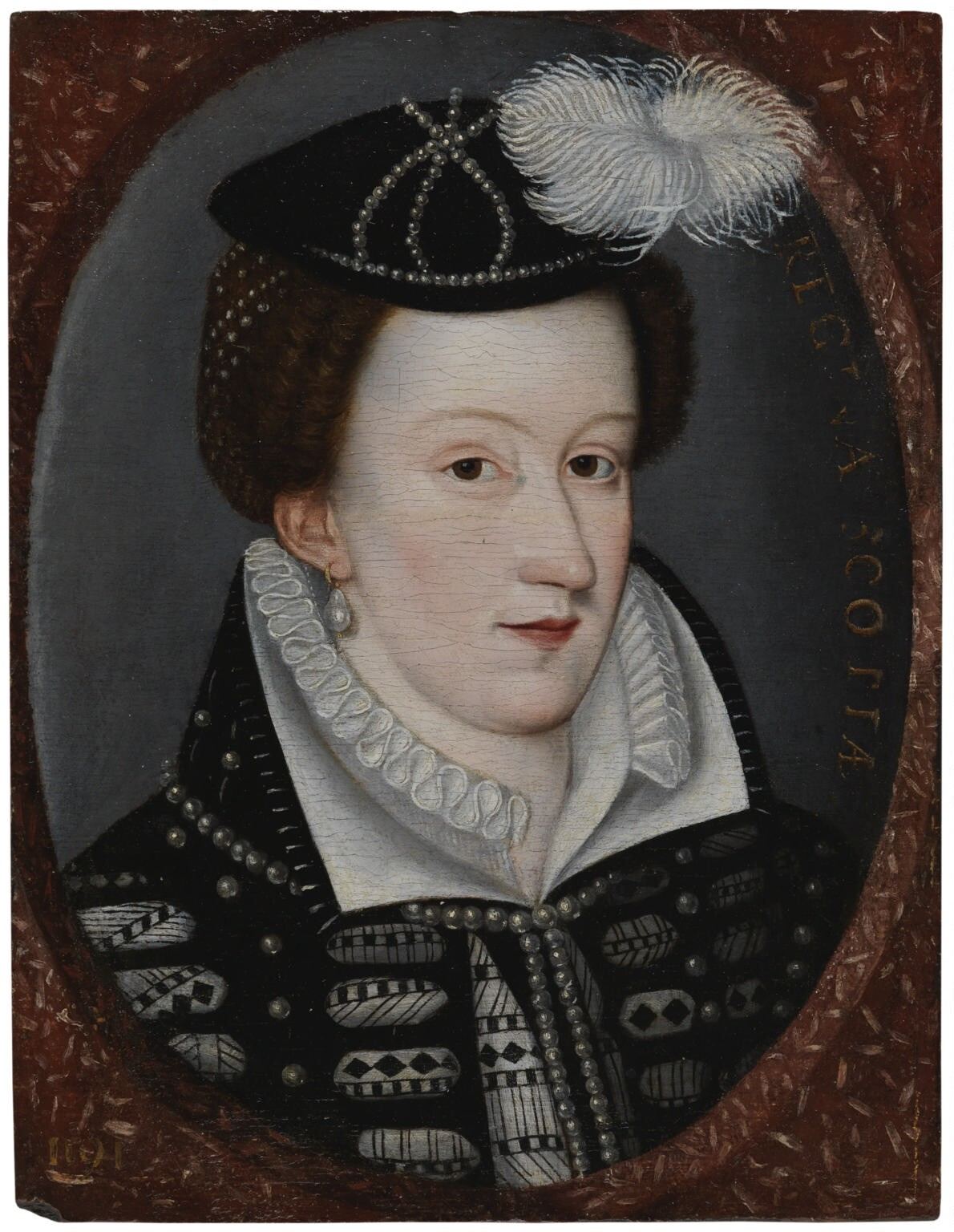
Mary, Queen of Scots gave Ralph a gold chain when he visited Stirling Castle

Ralph Liggons attended the baptism of James VI at Stirling Castle in December 1566. Mary, Queen of Scots gave him a gold chain. He was involved in the Rising of the North in 1569, and plotted with Thomas Howard, 4th Duke of Norfolk and Mary, Queen of Scots. He received a pension from Philip II of Spain. Mary's secretary Claude Nau sent him a cipher code to use in correspondence in January 1577.

He was an exile in Brussels and Paris after the revealing of the Ridolfi Plot. Mary, Queen of Scots also left him a pension in her will.

Liggons was involved in the 1605 Gunpowder Plot.
