= Blanche Parry =

Personal attendant of Queen Elizabeth I of England

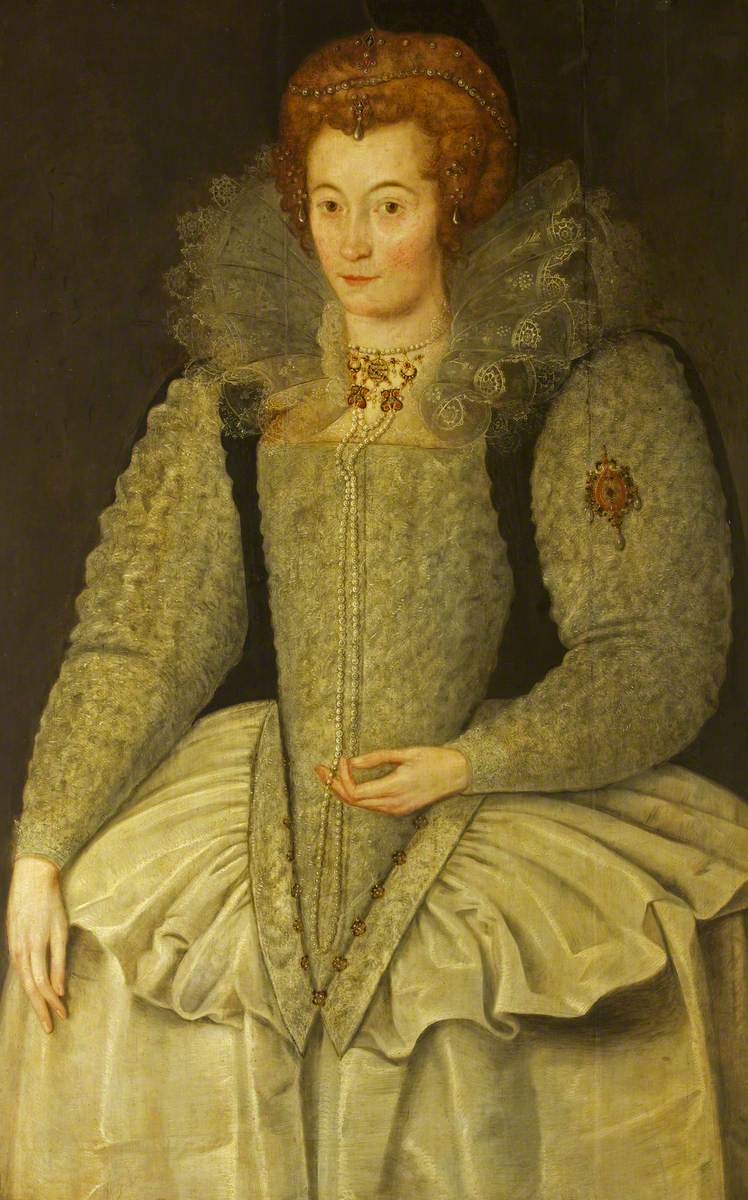
Blanche Parry (1508-1590) possibly Marcus Geeraerts, the younger (Bruges 1561/2 - London 1635/6)

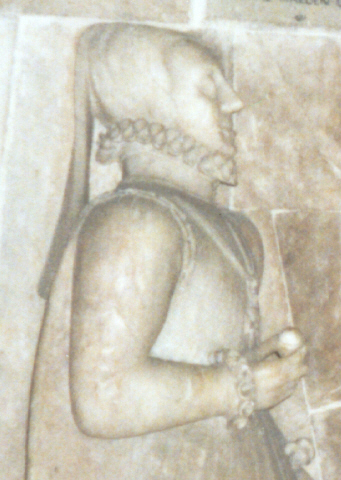
Blanche Parry. Detail from her monument in St Faith's church, Bacton

Blanche Parry (1507 or 1508 – 12 February 1590) of Newcourt in the parish of Bacton, Herefordshire, in the Welsh Marches, was a personal attendant of Queen Elizabeth I, holding the offices of Chief Gentlewoman of the Queen's Most Honourable Privy Chamber and Keeper of Her Majesty's Jewels.

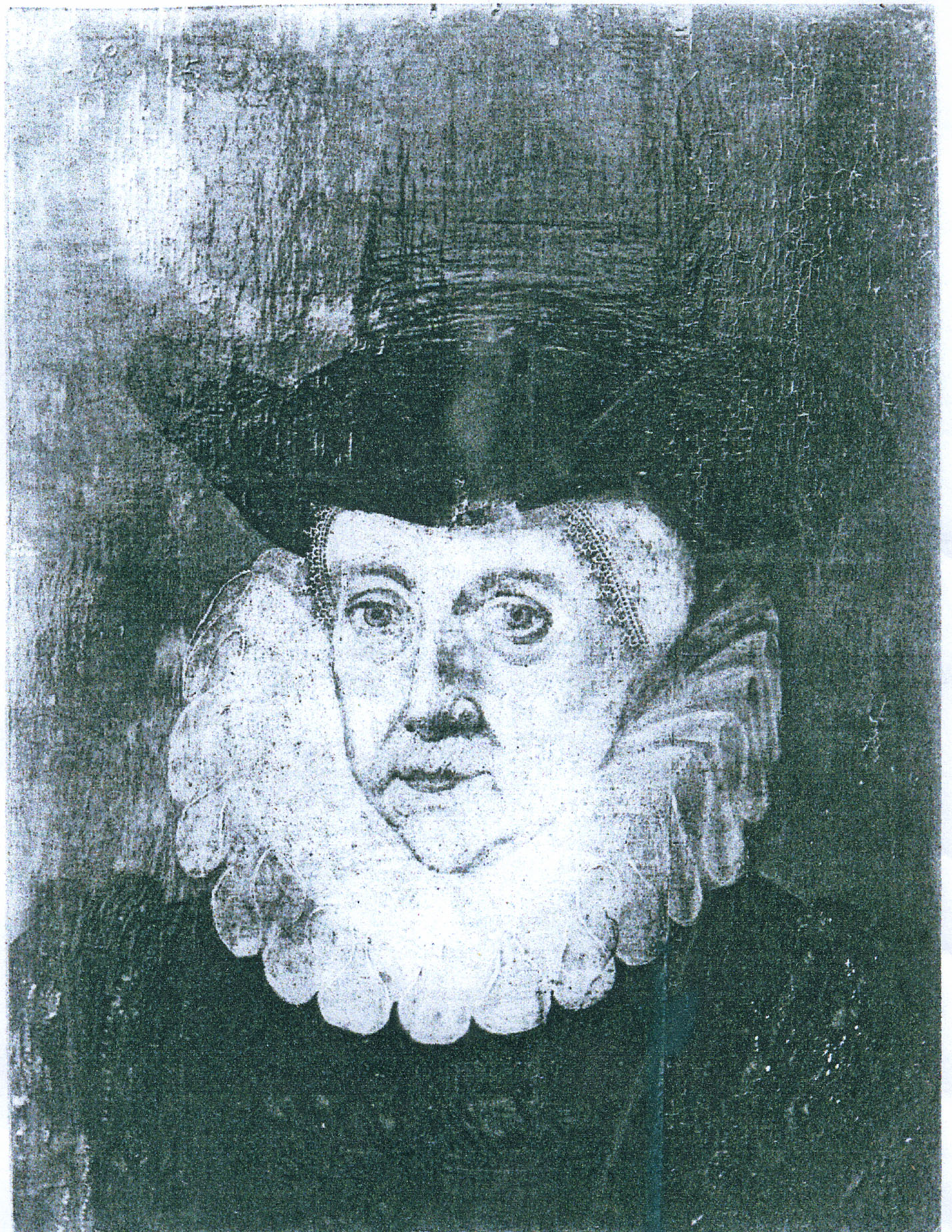
Blanche Parry

== Origins ==
Parry was born at Newcourt, Bacton, Herefordshire. She was a daughter of Henry Myles (Note: Parry was only adopted as a surname in the next generation. In the Welsh patronymic naming system, surnames were created from the father's given name; thus, "ap Harry", meaning "son of Harry"; which was then anglicised to form the surname "Parry".) of Newcourt, who was three times Sheriff of Herefordshire; Steward of Ewyas Lacy and of Dore Abbey; and a relative of the Welsh family of Herbert, Earl of Pembroke, and of the prominent Stradling family of St Donat's Castle in Glamorgan, Wales. Her mother was Alice Milborne, the English daughter and co-heiress of Simon Milborne. Her paternal ancestors were of prominent border gentry stock.

== Early life ==
Brought up in a Welsh cultural environment, Parry was bilingual in Welsh and English. Indications exist of earlier family connections to the Lollards, not least her mother's family connection to Sir John Oldcastle. However, it appears that she and her sisters were educated by the Augustinian nuns of Aconbury.

== At the Royal Court ==
Blanche Parry arrived at the Royal Court with her aunt, Blanche, Lady Troy, who was the Lady Mistress to Edward VI and his half-sister Elizabeth I as children. From the age of about 25 or 26 until her death, she was a servant of Queen Elizabeth, whom she served from her birth in 1533 onwards, writing in her epitaph in Bacton Church that her "cradle saw I rocked". She may have supervised the team of "rockers". Thereafter, Blanche hardly left Elizabeth and almost certainly attended her during her imprisonment in the Tower of London before she came to the throne. Her annuity or wage in the household for six months in 1552 was 100 shillings and she was allowed 30 shillings for horse fodder.

Following Elizabeth's accession in 1558, as her epitaph at Bacton relates, Parry was sworn in as a lady of the bed chamber. After Kat Ashley's death in 1565, Parry was appointed the Chief Gentlewoman of the Privy Chamber, and was one of those who controlled access to the Queen. She was in charge of the Queen's jewels from before Elizabeth's accession, of the Great Seal of England for two years, and of the Queen's personal papers, clothes, furs and books, many of which were presented to the Queen as New Year gifts. She received considerable sums of money on behalf of the Queen. She passed information to the Queen, including from John Vaughan, Blanche Parry's nephew, during the Northern Rebellion of 1569–1570, and from Sir Nicholas White, Master of the Rolls in Ireland, and she received presentations of Parliamentary bills for the Queen. She also wrote letters on the Queen's behalf. In addition, she supervised the Queen's linen "and other things belonging to her majesty"; this included "our musk cat", probably a ferret.

Blanche Parry's position at the centre of the Court and as conduit to royal power, with the ability to make pleas on behalf of those suffering under royal displeasure, was fully recognized at the time. She was friends with her cousin Sir William Cecil, Lord Burghley, the Queen's chief adviser, and worked closely with him. Amongst the material rewards she received from Elizabeth were two wardships, as well as lands she acquired in Herefordshire, Yorkshire and Wales. Records show frequent gifts of clothing previously worn by the queen.

She gave Elizabeth presents of silver, including a double porringer and four silver boxes with silver gilt covers. For New Year's day 1572 she gave the queen a flower of gold enamelled with rubies and diamonds (which the queen later gave to Elizabeth Howard); in 1573 Parry gave the queen a jewel of mother-of-pearl set with gold hanging from three gold chains with an agate pendant; and in 1575 a gold flower enamelled green with three white roses, sparks of ruby, and in the midst, a fly.

In August 1582, Blanche Parry wrote a letter on behalf of Miles Pendred of Northbourne who was in need of legal help. His wife Anne or Elizabeth Lewin had been one of the queen's nurses, and her brother Thomas Lewin had also been a servant in Elizabeth's household.

Parry commissioned the first known map of Llangorse Lake in 1584 to aid the deliberations in a court case in which she became involved. In January 1587, she gave Queen Elizabeth a jewel with a "serpent's tongue" set in gold, thought to serve as a talisman against poisoning. After 1587, responsibility for the queen's personal jewellery passed to Mary Radcliffe. Parry made an inventory of the jewels, now held by the British Library, listing 628 pieces delivered into the custody of Mary Radcliffe. William Cecil supervised both her wills; his handwritten notes survive for her first will dated 1578, and he was supervisor for her final will dated 1589.

== Death and burial ==
Blanche Parry died on 12 February 1590, aged 82. She was buried in St. Margaret's Church, Westminster, with the rank of baroness, the queen having paid all her funeral expenses. She was buried near her nephew John Vaughan. The chief mourner was Frances, Lady Burgh. Two monuments to her memory survive: the unused monument in St. Faith's Church, Bacton, Herefordshire, and her tomb monument in St Margaret's, Westminster.

Thomas Markham of Ollerton sent news of her death to the Earl of Shrewsbury: "On Thursday last Mrs Blanshe a Parrye departed; blind she was here on earth, but I hope the joys in heaven she shall see."

=== Monument in St Margaret's Church, Westminster ===
Her marble and alabaster mural monument survives on the southwest wall of St Margaret's Church, Westminster, although this was not its original position, having been moved several times. It was formerly on the south side of the chancel; George Ballard saw her tomb in its original location in 1752. It shows a relief-sculpted and painted effigy of Parry kneeling towards the left at a prayer desk, with hands now missing. Above are displayed in a lozenge (appropriate for a female armiger) her paternal arms of eight quarters. Payment for the monument is recorded as having been made by Mr Powell, her executor, in 1595/6. The inscription is as follows (note that her executors named her father incorrectly: he used Welsh nomenclature):

Hereunder is intombed Blanche Parrye daughter of Henry Parry of New Courte in the county of Herefd. Esquier, Gentlewoman of Queene Elizabethes most honourable bedchamber and keper of her Maties. juells, whome she faithfullie served from her Highnes birth. Beneficiall to her kinsfolke and countryemen charitable to the poor insomuch that she gave to the poore of Bacton and Newton in Herefordshire seaven score bushells of wheate and rye yearlie for ever wt. (i.e. with) divers somes of money to Westminster and other places for good uses. She died a maide in the eighte two yeers of her age the twelfe of February 1589.

=== Monument in Bacton Church ===
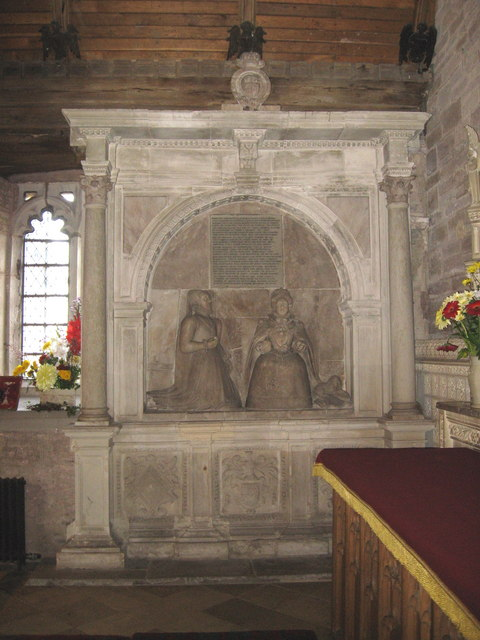
Monument and tomb of Blanche Parry in Bacton Church.

Having originally planned her retirement to the family estate of Newcourt, Parry commissioned a monument in the parish church of Bacton, showing sculpted effigies of herself and the queen, with a 28 line inscription, probably composed by herself. Dated to before November 1578, the monument is the earliest known depiction of Queen Elizabeth I as Gloriana and signals the propagation of the queen's iconography and cult of virginity beyond the court. The inscription was designed to both demonstrate her closeness and importance to the queen, and bolster the royal image with the lines '"With maiden Queen a maide did end my life". The effigy utilizes the religious imagery of the Virgin Mary, with a kneeling Parry praying before the enthroned Elizabeth.

The scene has also been interpreted as depicting Blanche Parry giving the queen a gift. Tradition maintained that her monument in Bacton Church contained Blanche's bowels, or according to Bradford, her heart; however, there is no evidence of this.

== Bacton Altar Cloth ==
An altar or communion cloth at Bacton, the Bacton Altar cloth, was treasured for centuries, and in the 1870s it was thought the embroidery was the work of Blanche Parry herself. Charles Brothers, the rector of Bacton Church, arranged for the framing and display of the Bacton Altar Cloth in 1909. It was Brothers who first suggested that the Bacton Altar Cloth came from a dress belonging to Queen Elizabeth I. His view was known to Lionel Cust, who published it and expanded on the importance of the embroidery. Both had seen similar motifs on other portraits of the queen. Cust theorized the cloth was a gift from the queen to Parry, who had donated it to her parish church. The cloth has been identified as of late 16th-century origin, and while there is no documentary evidence linking it directly to Queen Elizabeth, curators stated that it is extremely likely to have once belonged to the queen. It is now known that the cloth, which is an extremely expensive fabric, was embroidered with the first set of beautiful motifs and made into a dress worn by the queen; then, the dress was dismantled, and the cloth was embroidered with the second set of motifs, cut and sewn into a Ridley Altar Cloth, and finally sent to Bacton Church in memory of Blanche Parry. It was not owned by Blanche Parry but was sent to Bacton Church because of Blanche Parry, possibly by the queen.
