= Lewys Morgannwg =

Lewys Morgannwg (fl. 1520–65) was a Welsh language poet from Morgannwg, south Wales. He lived at St. Bride's Major

Lewys was one of the foremost poets of the sixteenth century. Most of his poems that have survived are eulogies and elegies in strict metre. Lewys was the household poet to Sir William Griffith of Penrhyn. He was also a bardic teacher, most notably of Gruffudd Hiraethog.

== Bibliography ==
- A. Cynfael Lake and Ann Parry Owen (eds.) Gwaith Lewys Morgannwg (Aberystwyth, 2005)
