= Margaret Masterton =

- Spouse: James Primrose
- Children: George Primrose
- Parents: Alexander Masterton (father); Janet Couston (mother)

Margaret Masterton or Maistertoun was employed in 1594 at Stirling Castle as the nurse of Prince Henry, the son of James VI and I and Anne of Denmark.

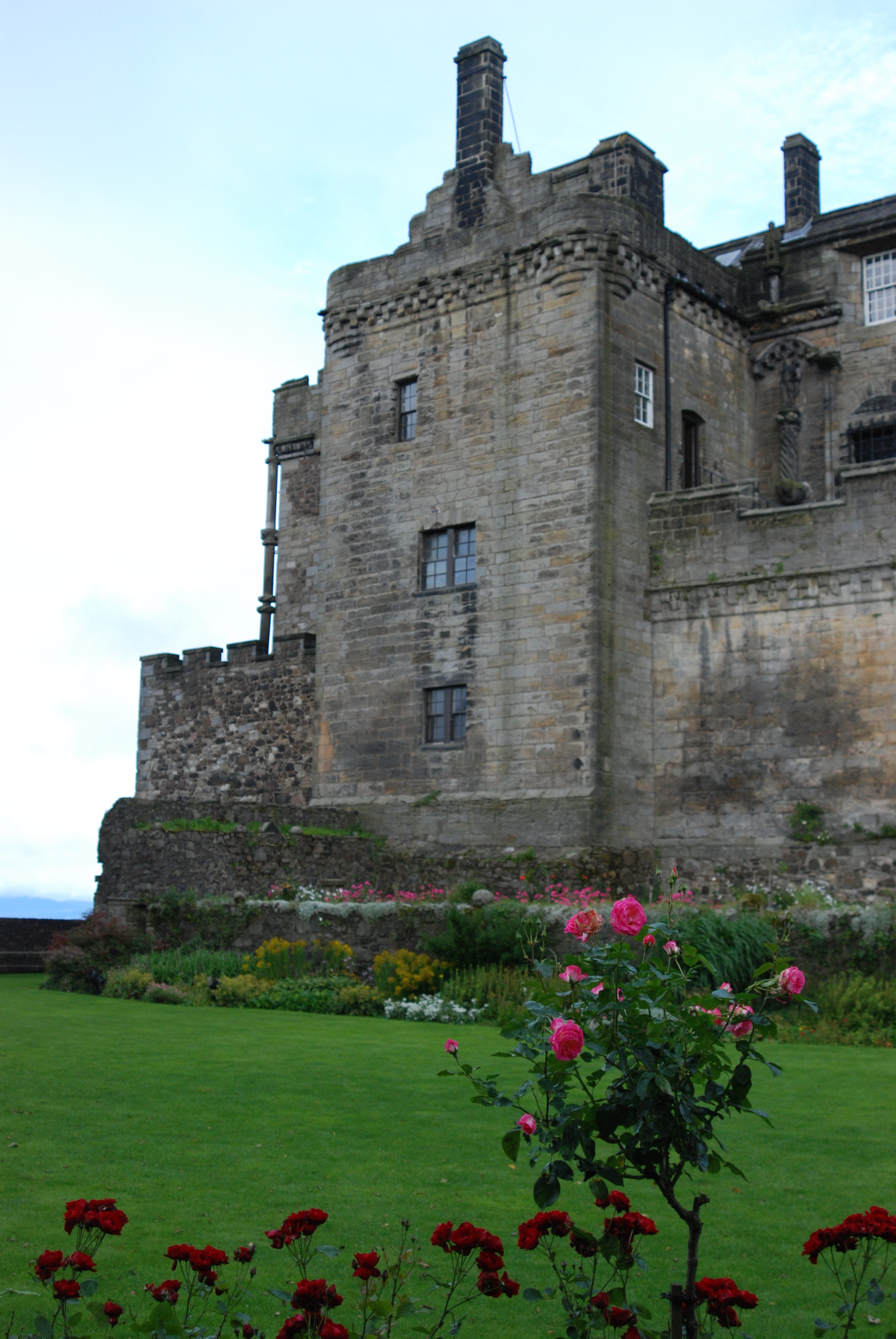
The Prince's Tower at Stirling Castle was refurbished for Prince Henry

She was a daughter of Janet Couston and Alexander Masterton of Bad in Perthshire and Masterton near Dunfermline, and Parkmill in Clackmannanshire. She married a lawyer, James Primrose of Barhill, Culross. He kept a record of his legal work, known as a "Protocol Book", which is preserved by the National Records of Scotland.

Margaret may have obtained her place in Prince Henry's household through the influence of a relation. A Gilbert Maistertoune worked for the Earl of Mar, and was paid £500 sterling in September 1595 from the English subsidy for the Prince's expenses.

In early modern Scotland married women did not usually adopt their husband's surnames. However, Margaret Masterton was sometimes known as "Mistress Primrose" and received annuity payments from Prince Henry under that name. Their son George Primrose was a clergyman at Hereford Cathedral and preacher at the Eignbrook Chapel in 1662.

Margaret Masterton may have been the wet-nurse to the Prince described by George Nicholson who became ill and was replaced in January 1595 by the wife of Henry Murray, a Stirling burgess. The baby would not feed unless his first nurse was present. Roger Aston also mentioned the change of nurse in a letter of May 1595. The Prince's laundress was Elizabeth Moncreif. She was provided with soap and "stiffing" (starch) for his clothes.
