= John Balfour (courtier) =

Scottish courtier

John Balfour was a Scottish courtier or servant at the court of Mary of Guise and Mary, Queen of Scots.

== Career at court ==
He was a valet in the Queen's Chamber and performed tasks related to the royal wardrobe. Servais de Condé and Toussaint Courcelles were his colleagues. His family is unclear. Another man, also recorded as "Master John Balfour" was an official of the Scottish mint in this period.

in June 1558, Balfour bought materials used for a theatrical representation in Edinburgh of the wedding of Mary, Queen of Scots, and Francis, Dauphin of France. The treasurer's accounts recorded this as a purchase made "against the solemnization of the marriage of our Sovereign Lady to be counterfeit in Edinburgh".

He was frequently tasked with buying materials for the queen's costume. In October 1566 he bought materials in Edinburgh to send to the queen at Stirling Castle. These included gold and silver thread and needles for embroidery.

In March 1562 he bought the cloth which Mary gave to 19 maidens on "Skyris Thursday" or Maundy Thursday at Falkland Palace. In May he bought gold passementerie for the wedding gown of Lady Fleming and linen for shirts and collars for one of the queen's fools. In July he refurbished the beds at Falkland Palace and bought yellow and violet satin for a gown for Mademoiselle Rallay.

He bought warm plaiding for seven of the queen's ladies in waiting in August 1562. In September 1562 Balfour went north with the queen. He bought six tartan plaids in Inverness. He was involved in packing the tapestries and other furnishings confiscated from Huntly Castle and the Bog o'Gight in barrels for shipping to Edinburgh.

On 30 October 1566 Mary gave Balfour money to distribute amongst the poor folk of Jedburgh and sent him to Edinburgh to Servais de Condé with money to pay emboidererers. In December 1566 he bought cloth for the baptism of James VI at Stirling, and new clothes for Lady Reres. In February 1567, after the death of Lord Darnley, he bought black serge of Florence to be mourning clothes for the queen.
