= Blanche Milborne =

English aristocrat (d.1557)

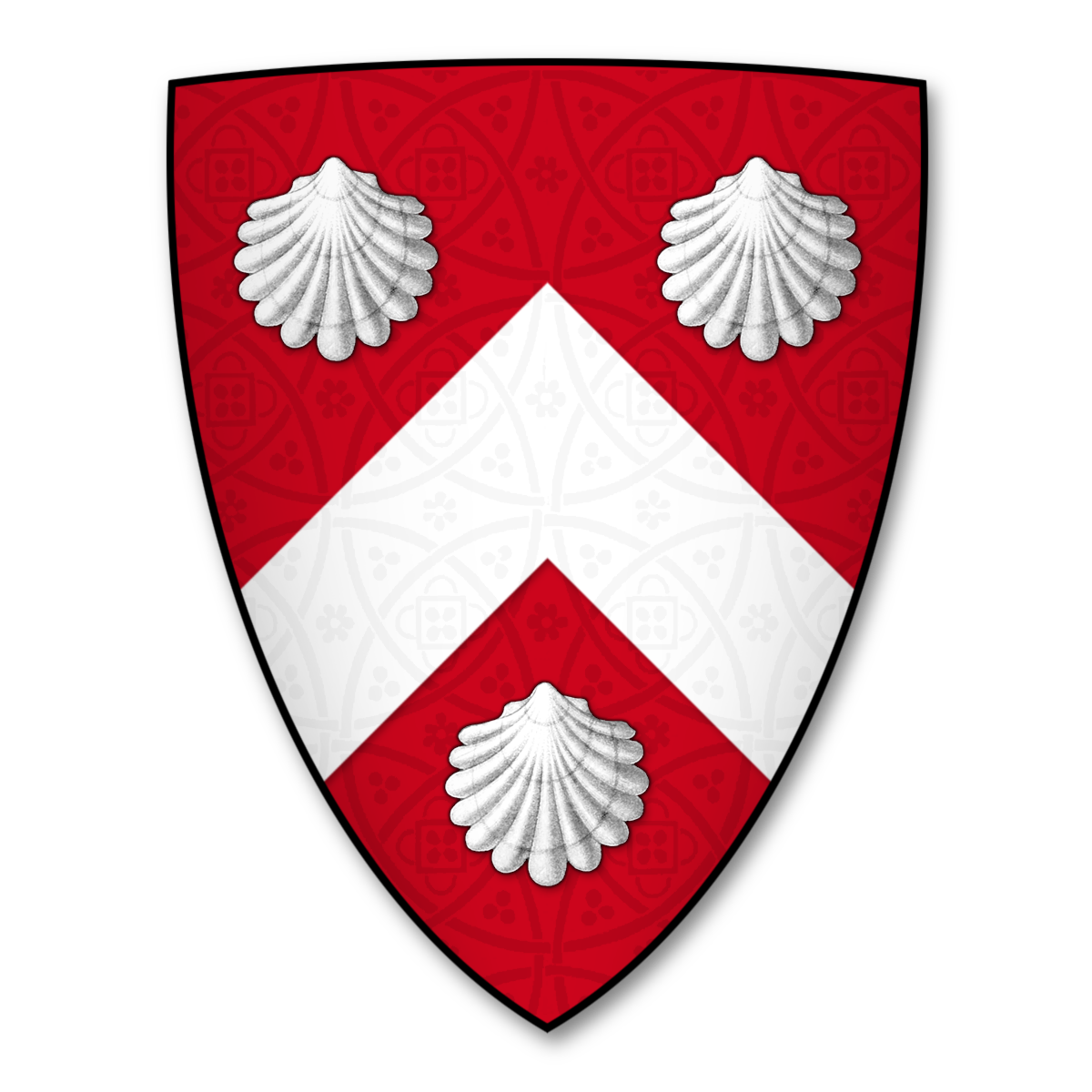
- Coat of arms
- Spouses: James Whitney (died 1500) Sir William Herbert of Troy Parva (before 1502)
- Issue: With James Whitney: Robert; James; Watkin; Elizabeth; With William Herbert: Charles; Thomas
- Father: Simon Milborne
- Mother: Jane Baskerville

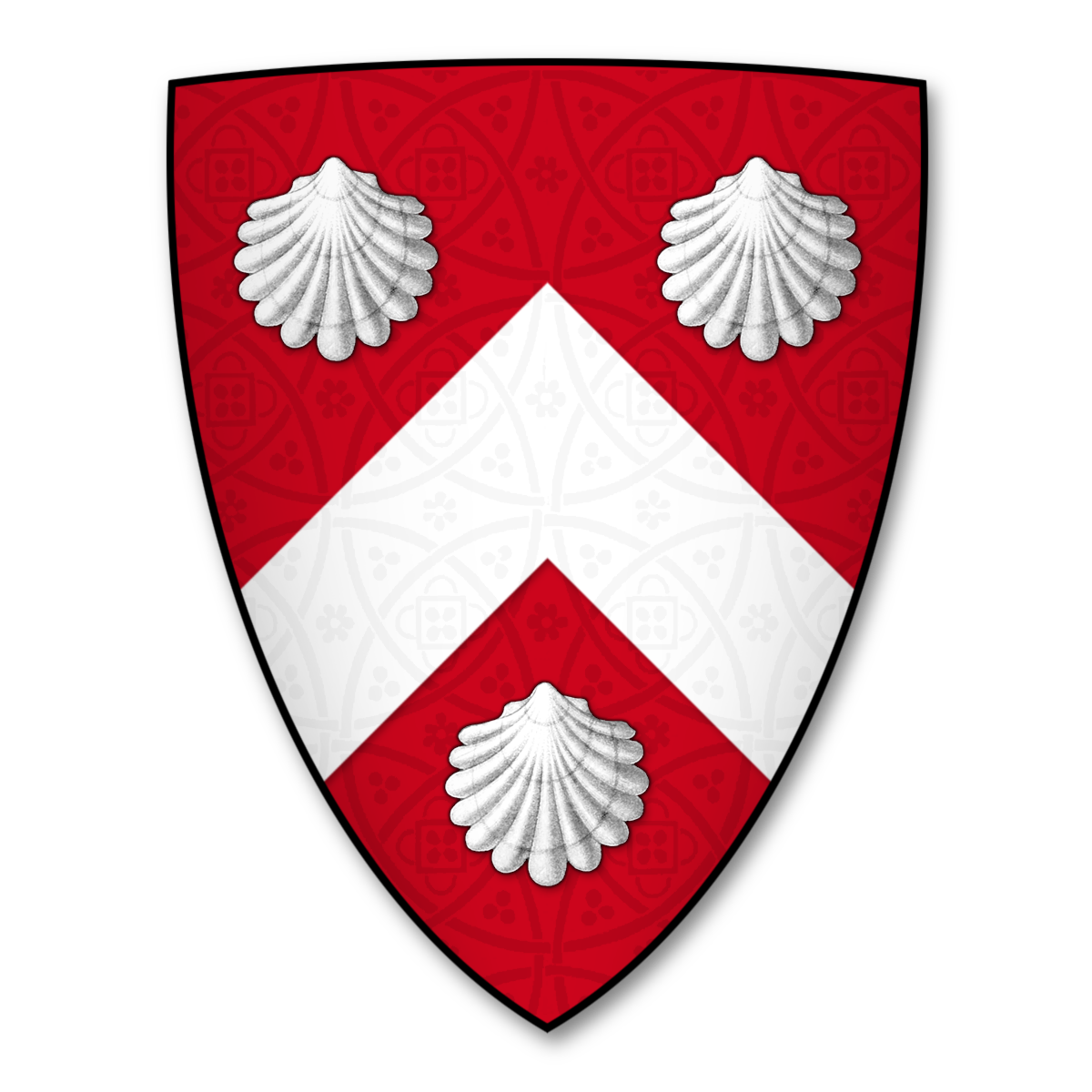
Coat of Arms of the Milborne family of Burghill and of Tillington

Blanche Milborne, Lady Herbert of Troy (fl. 1557) was the Lady Mistress in charge of the upbringing of Queen Elizabeth I, Edward VI, and also of Queen Mary when she lived with the younger Tudor children. She was twice married, and widowed; first to James Whitney, then to Sir William Herbert of Troy Parva, an illegitimate son of William Herbert, 1st Earl of Pembroke and one of his mistresses. She had six children. Blanche Milborne died c. 1557 before Queen Elizabeth I's accession.

== Early life ==
Blanche Milborne was one of the eleven co-heiresses (a son and daughter died young) of Simon Milborne and Jane (Baskerville) of Burghill, Herefordshire. Her eldest sister, Alice married Henry Myles and they were the parents of Blanche Parry.

The family had widespread gentry connections; Sir William Herbert, 1st Earl of Pembroke (1st creation) married Ann Devereux, the niece of Simon Milborne's mother, Elizabeth Devereux. Blanche was also connected to Queen Catherine Parr sharing Agnes Crophull as an ancestress making them second cousins.

== First marriage ==
Blanche Milborne married James Whitney of Whitney and Pen-cwm; her dowry was the manor of Icomb in Gloucestershire which had belonged to her father and was inherited by their eldest son, Robert. James Whitney died on 30 July 1500, leaving Blanche with Robert aged thirteen years, and James, Watkin and Elizabeth who were younger. Elizabeth's daughter, Ann Morgan of Arkstone, Herefordshire, married Henry Carey, later Lord Hunsdon by licence on 21 May 1545, and the son of Mary Boleyn.

== Second marriage ==
Between July 1500 and August 1502 Blanche remarried, becoming the second wife of Sir William Herbert of Troy Parva, an illegitimate son of Sir William Herbert, 1st Earl of Pembroke and one of his mistresses, Frond verch Hoesgyn. It was a Welsh household; although Blanche was English she would have also been Welsh-speaking. Lewys Morgannwg states that she and her husband welcomed King Henry VII, his Earls and possibly his Queen to Troy House, Mitchel Troy near Monmouth in August 1502.

Blanche and Sir William had two sons Charles and Thomas, both of whom were eventually knighted and served as sheriffs of Monmouthshire. Sir William also had an illegitimate son, Richard. Charles Herbert married Elizabeth, a daughter of Gruffydd ap Rhys ap Thomas (died 1521). Thomas Herbert of Llanwarne married (secondly) Anne Lucy, a daughter of Thomas Lucy (died 1525) of Charlecote and his wife Elizabeth née Empson.

In 1505, Sir William Herbert of Troy gave an undertaking to keep the peace with his half-brother, Sir Walter Herbert of Raglan, and with Henry Myles, his brother-in-law. He is recorded as being an annuitant of Edward Stafford, 3rd Duke of Buckingham at Thornbury Castle in 1508, Sheriff of Herefordshire in 1515 and was knighted between Easter and Michaelmas 1516. He died in 1524; Blanche and their son Charles were executors of his Will, in which Blanche was well provided for. A clause of the Will trusted that Henry Somerset (then Lord Herbert but succeeded as 2nd Earl of Worcester in 1526/7) would be "a good lord to my wife and children." Sir William also requested that "Blanche will keep herself sole."

== Royal court ==
By the 1530s, Lady Herbert of Troy was in the Royal Household as shown by a later report, author not named (on the subversive activities of the Earl of Essex and Roger Vaughan in 1601) which has the preamble "My mother was chosen and brought to the Court by my Lady Herbert of Troy, to have been her Majesty's (Queen Elizabeth I's) nurse and had been chosen before all other had her gracious mother (Queen Anne Boleyn) had her own will therein…" Lady Herbert of Troy is mentioned at the christening of Prince Edward in 1537; when the procession reformed at the conclusion of the ceremony, it was noted that, "Lady Elizabeth went with her sister Lady Mary and Lady Herbert of Troy to bear the train."

== Lady mistress ca. 1537 to ca. 1546 ==
Margaret Bryan was in charge of Princess Elizabeth when she was a baby, but she transferred to Prince Edward when he was born. The evidence shows that Lady Bryan was succeeded by Lady Herbert of Troy; Prince Edward was also placed in her charge when he grew older, for Lewys Morgannwg states that she was "in charge of his (Prince Edward’s) fosterage." Lady Herbert of Troy's position is confirmed by lists of personnel for Lady Elizabeth in the Letters and Papers of Henry VIII. Internal evidence suggests a range of dates for these lists from before 1536 to 1546. Lady Herbert of Troy's name heads the earlier lists, followed by Kate Champernon, who was appointed in 1536 as a governess. In 1545, Roger Ascham (whose page was John Whitney, possibly a relation of Blanche Milborne) wrote to Champernon asking that she commend him to "my good Lady Troy and all that company of gentlewomen." However, the c.1546 household list for Lady Elizabeth does not mention Lady Herbert of Troy indicating that she retired from her position in late 1545 or early 1546; Elizabeth was then twelve years old.

In 1549, Sir Robert Tyrwhitt wrote that "Ashley…was made her mistress (Lady Elizabeth’s) by the king her father… But four of her gentlewomen confess that Ashley first removed Lady Troy…and then her successor (Blanche) Parry…". Lady Herbert of Troy had evidently intended her niece Blanche to succeed her but the post of Lady Mistress was given to Champernon (Blanche Parry remained as second in the household, succeeding Champernon when the latter died in 1565.)

== Retirement ==
Blanche Milborne retired to her own furnished apartments at Troy House where she was cared for by her son Charles and his wife, Cicill. The Household Accounts of Princess Elizabeth (1551–1552, Hatfield) show that Elizabeth sent her a regular half-yearly pension "by warrant" which was about half the amount she would have received while in post; a servant of the Knights Marshall was paid to deliver it.

== Death ==
Blanche Milborne died probably in 1557 and certainly before the accession of Queen Elizabeth in November 1558. If she was buried as her second husband had intended in the tomb in Monmouth parish church, now lost, it would have been adorned by the three effigies of Blanche Milborne, Sir William and his first wife.

Her funeral elegy, composed by the bard Lewys Morgannwg, includes the lines:

Arglwyddes breninesau,..................(She was a) Lady (in charge) of Queens,
Gofrner oedd ban oedd yn iau...........A governess she was in her youth.
Hi a wyddiad yn weddus..................She knew in a fitting manner
Wybodau iarllesau'r llys,.................The accomplishments of the ladies of the court,
Gorcheidwad cyn ymadaw...............(And she was the) guardian, before she passed away,
Tŷ Harri Wyth a'i blant draw.............Of Henry VIII’s household and his children yonder.
I Edwart Frenin ydoedd,...................To King Edward she was a true
Uwch ei faeth, goruchaf oedd,..........(And) wise lady of dignity,
Waetio yr oedd at ei Ras,.................In charge of his fosterage (she was pre-eminent),
Gywirddoeth wraig o urddas.............(And) she waited upon his Grace.
Arglwyddys plas a gladden',.............(She, whom) they buried, the Lady of the palace of Troy,
Troe, a'i llew lletyai'r ieirll hen............And her lion (i.e. William), gave hospitality to the old Earls.
Bu i frenin, bu fawr unwaith,..............A welcome was given to the King, Henry VII,
Roeso, a'i ieirll, Harri Saith................And his Earls; he was great once.
Gweddu y bu tra fu fyw......................She gave service all her life,
Hon sydd frenhines heddiw................To the one who is Queen today (i.e. Mary I)….
