= Bacton, Herefordshire =

Village in Herefordshire, England

Coordinates: 51.986777°N 2.919323°W

Bacton
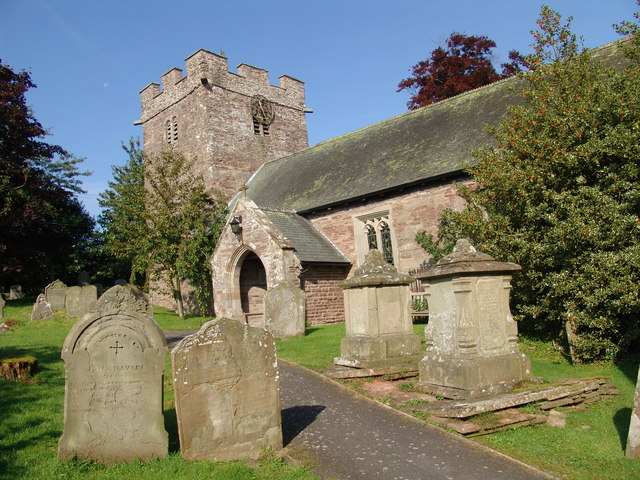
- Saint Faith's church, Bacton

- Location within Herefordshire
- OS grid reference: SO369324
- Shire county: Herefordshire
- Region: West Midlands
- Country: England
- Sovereign state: United Kingdom
- Post town: HEREFORD
- Postcode district: HR2
- Police: West Mercia
- Fire: Hereford and Worcester
- Ambulance: West Midlands

Bacton is a small village in a rural area of south-west Herefordshire, England, 14 miles (23 km) from Hereford.

== History ==
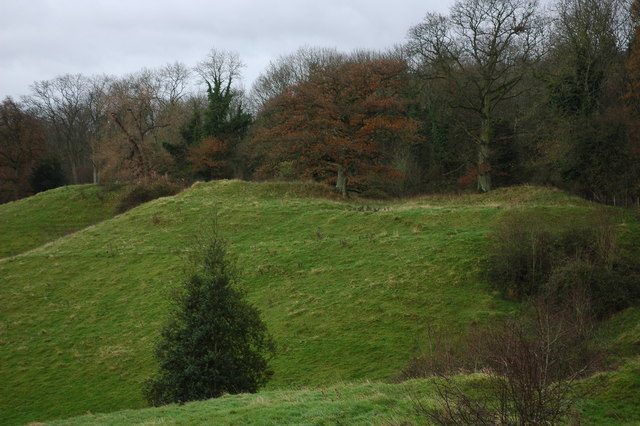
Newcourt Tump

One mile to the north are some earthwork remains of a small motte and bailey castle known as Newcourt Tump – "Tump" is a dialect word for a rounded hill or tumulus. The castle seems to have fallen out of use by the 14th century.

According to Domesday Book in 1086, Bacton, then in the hundred of Stradel, had only two households. The Lord of the Manor was Gilbert of Eskecot, whose tenant-in-chief was Roger of Lacy. The manor's history becomes clearer from the 13th century onwards.

=== Parish church ===
The parish church of St Faith's dates from 13th century and has a lengthy entry in Pevsner's survey of the county's buildings.

Inside is a memorial to Blanche Parry. It is possible that an altar cloth belonging to the church was made from a dress once worn by Queen Elizabeth I of England and given to Blanche Parry. The material of the cloth appears to form part of the clothing of the Queen in the early 17th-century "Rainbow Portrait", attributed to Marcus Gheeraerts the Younger.

The church belongs to the Ewyas Harold group of parishes and has a service about once a month. Next to it is a village hall.

=== Listed buildings ===
Bacton parish church is listed Grade II*. A further 16 buildings, barns and monuments from the 17th to 20th centuries are listed as Grade II, several of them in the churchyard.

== Transport ==
Bacton has a single, daytime bus service to Hereford on Wednesdays. The nearest railway station is at Hereford (14 miles, 23 km). Bacton is 4 miles (6.4 km) on the secondary B4347 road from the main A465 road between Hereford and Abergavenny.
