= Wedding of Mary, Queen of Scots, and the Earl of Bothwell =

1567 wedding in Scotland

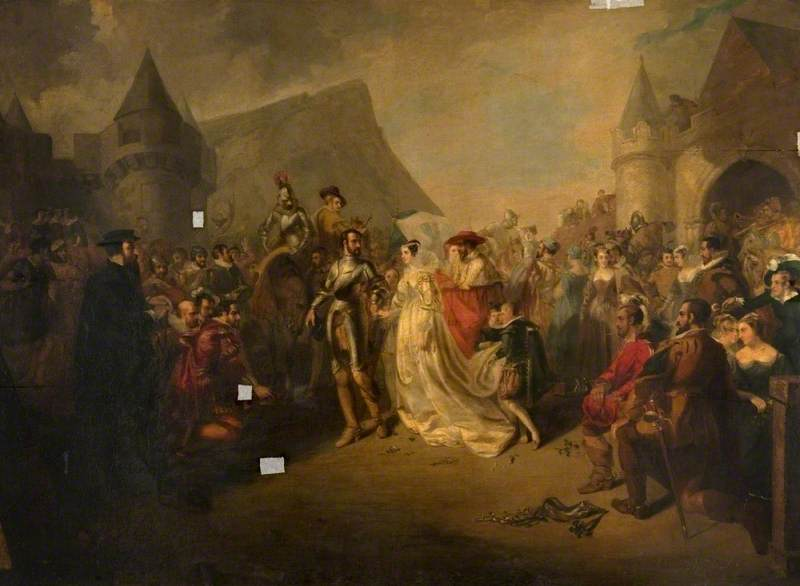
The Marriage of Mary, Queen of Scots, and the Earl of Bothwell, by James Drummond

The wedding of Mary, Queen of Scots and James Hepburn, 4th Earl of Bothwell took place at Holyrood Palace on 15 May 1567.

== Background ==
Mary had been Queen of Scotland since 1542. Her second husband, Henry Stuart, Lord Darnley was killed at the Kirk O'Field on 10 February 1567. Although the Earl of Bothwell was suspected of involvement in Darnley's murder he had been acquitted at a trial held on 12 April.

=== Parliament in April ===
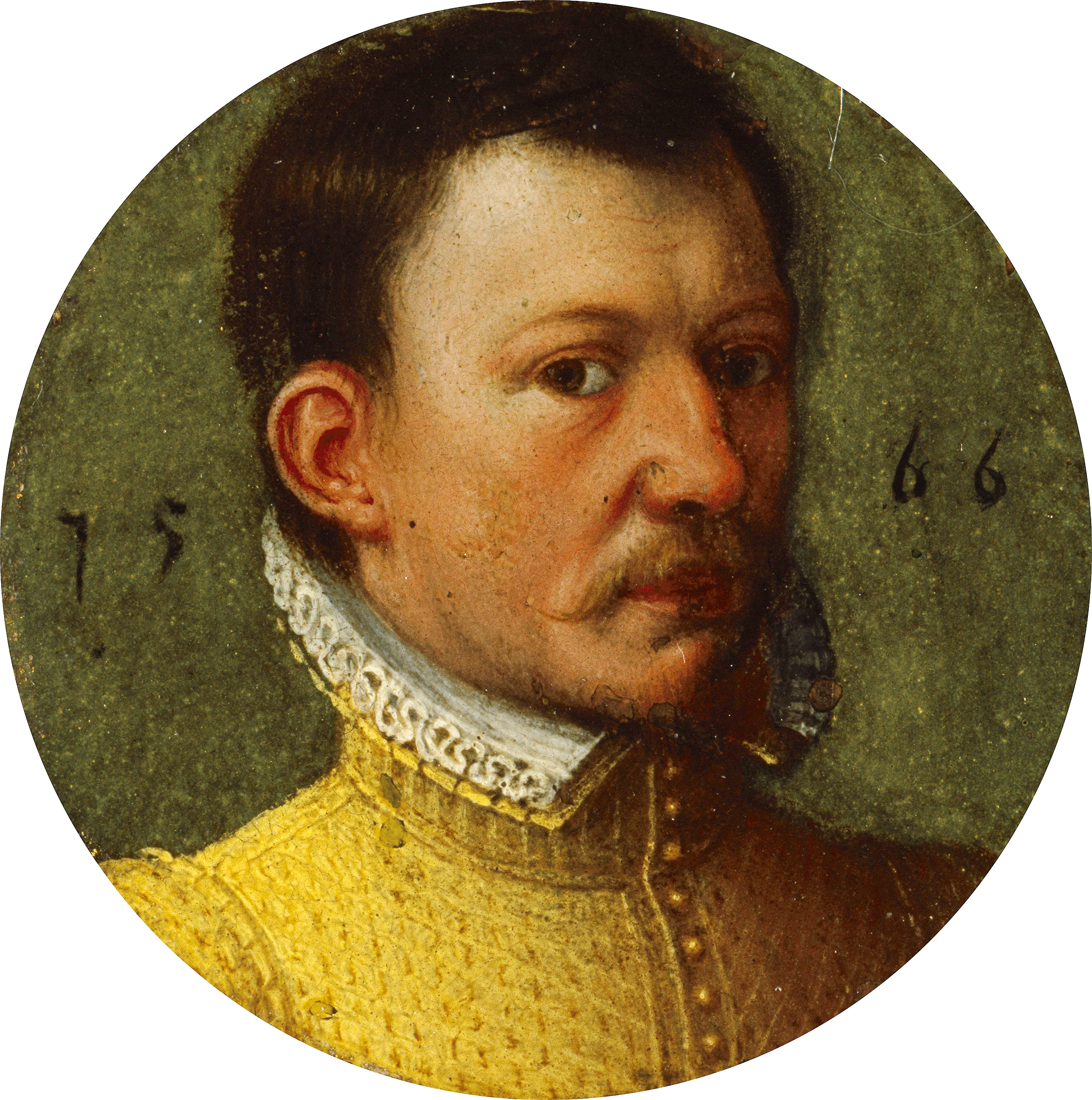
James Hepburn, 4th Earl of Bothwell

Mary went to open parliament escorted by her own guard armed with firearms rather than accepting the "ancient custom" of a guard provided by the bailies of Edinburgh. Bothwell was given the role of holding the sceptre, one of the Honours of Scotland, at Parliament on 14 April 1567. The Parliament passed an Act against making and posting placards and bills to the "slander, reproach, and infamy" of her majesty, such as the "mermaid and hare" posters or challenges to combat like those made by James Murray of Pardewis. Writings called "tickets" denouncing Bothwell and his alleged accomplices in the king's murder had been fixed to Edinburgh's Mercat Cross. When Parliament ended, Bothwell carried the sword to Holyrood Palace.

=== Bothwell's divorce ===
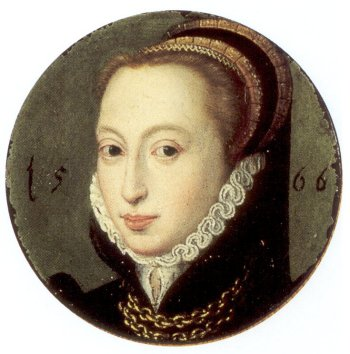
Jean Gordon, Countess of Bothwell

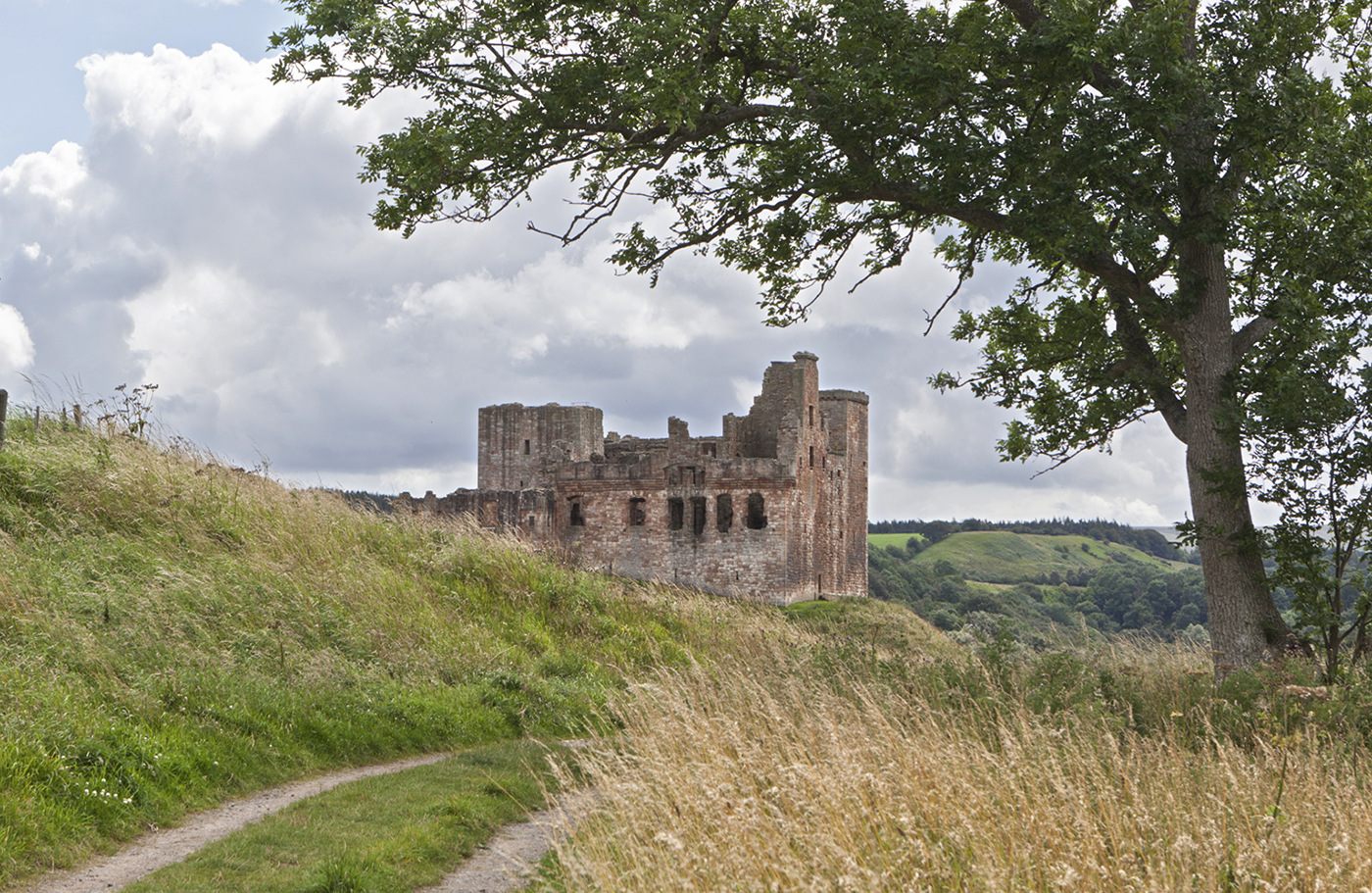
Jean Gordon may have been coerced to sign divorce papers at Crichton Castle

On the last day of Parliament, Bothwell's supporters signed a document known as the Ainslie Tavern Bond, which approved him as a potential consort for Queen Mary. Bothwell was already married to Jean Gordon, and a divorce was arranged and completed on 3 May. Bothwell was reported to have had an affair with her servant Bessie Crawford, meeting her at Haddington and in the kitchen tower of Crichton Castle. Bessie, who was about 20 years old, had been a servant of Jean's mother Elizabeth Keith, Countess of Huntly. The witnesses for the divorce said her father was a blacksmith. Meanwhile, a "ticket" was fixed to the Mercat Cross, to the effect that that Bothwell could not be divorced in order to marry the widow of someone he had killed.

William Kirkcaldy of Grange opposed Mary's marriage to Bothwell and regarded the proceedings in Parliament with dismay. On 20 April 1567, he wrote to the Earl of Bedford, an English diplomat, that Mary did not care if she lost France, England and Scotland for Bothwell's sake, and said she would go with him to the world's end in a petticoat;

sho caris not to lose France Ingland and her owne countrie for him, and sall go with him to the warldes ende in ane white peticote or she leve him.

Queen Elizabeth disapproved of Kirkcaldy offering his opinions of a fellow queen as if she were "worse than any common woman". Thomas Randolph talked with Elizabeth, and left with the impression that he "should admonish him [Kirkcaldy] of her misliking". Elizabeth was concerned that if the marriage went ahead, Bothwell would form a stronger alliance with France.

Later, in the summer of 1567, when the divorce was called into question, the English diplomat Nicolas Throckmorton heard that Jean Gordon (anticipating that the process might be reversed) told Annas Keith that she would "never live with the Earl Bothwell, nor take him for her husband". By 9 August 1567, the Privy Council would assert that the royal marriage was pretended and unlawful, and Bothwell was "ane uther wyffis husband".

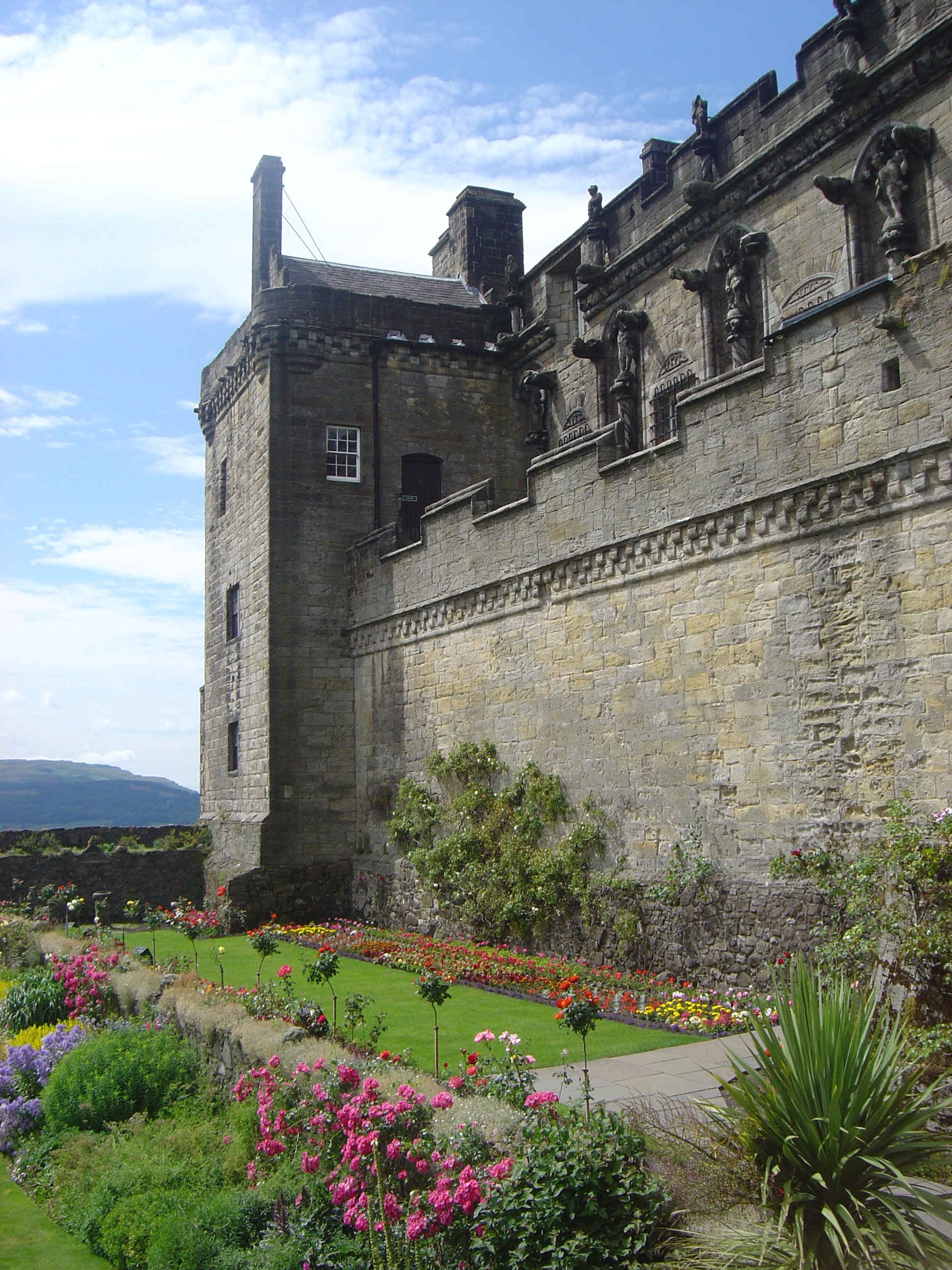
The Prince's Tower at Stirling Castle

Jean Gordon carefully kept the Papal dispensation that had been required for her marriage to Bothwell at Dunrobin Castle. John Lesley, Bishop of Ross, in his published Defence of the Honour of Marie Queene of Scotlande, denied a rumour that Jean Gordon was pressured to sign the divorce papers as Mary would then restore the Gordon lands forfeited in 1562 after Corrichie. He asserted that any irregularities were due to Bothwell, who was the dupe of a wider conspiracy. Lesley, involved in Mary's later plans to annul her marriage to Bothwell, constructed a second narrative in which Bothwell threatened and cajoled the lords to sign the tavern bond, and confined Jean Gordon at Crichton Castle with the choice of signing the process of divorce or drinking poison.

According to William Drury, an English commander at Berwick, one factor in the divorce was Bothwell's relationship with Janet Beaton, Lady Buccleuch. Drury wrote numerous letters to William Cecil with news from Scotland. He reported that Mary and Bothwell visited Edinburgh Castle on Sunday 16 April and spoke to the footmen of her guard in the great hall. The soldiers were anxious about pay. Bothwell argued and nearly started a fight. Mary promised to give the Captains 400 gold crowns, two for each soldier. Drury heard an inaccurate report that the divorce had passed by law in the Tolbooth, allowing Jane Gordon to remarry, but not Bothwell. He heard at the end of April that Jean Gordon now had doubts about the divorce and said she would "never say untruly of herself, but die with the name of the Lady Bothwell".

=== Thomas Bishop's letter ===
James Melville of Halhill mentioned an incident at Holyrood Palace in Mary's lodgings in the James V tower in his Memoir. Some doubt has been raised about his story by writers including Agnes Strickland. Melville wrote that he had received a letter which appeared to be from Thomas Bishop, an English servant of Darnley's parents. The letter denounced Bothwell for his faults and Mary's plan to marry him. He brought the letter to court and showed it to Mary. She showed it to William Maitland of Lethington, who thought that Bothwell would blame him. Bothwell was still having his dinner in a room below. Melville left the palace to avoid Bothwell's fury. Mary, according to Melville, was displeased that Bothwell was driving away her servants. Melville returned to Holyrood and discussed the letter, which was said not to be from Thomas Bishop after all. At this time, according to Melville, Mary declared that her marriage plan was not yet settled, "matters wer not that far agaitwart".

=== At Stirling ===
The Scottish lords who opposed the marriage are known as the Confederate Lords. These included John Erskine, Earl of Mar who was the keeper of Prince James at Stirling Castle. When Mary came to see James at Stirling on 21 April, Mar was able to limit her access by negotiation. Later, Mary's enemies said she had tried to poison her son at Stirling with a sugarloaf and an apple.

=== Dunbar ===
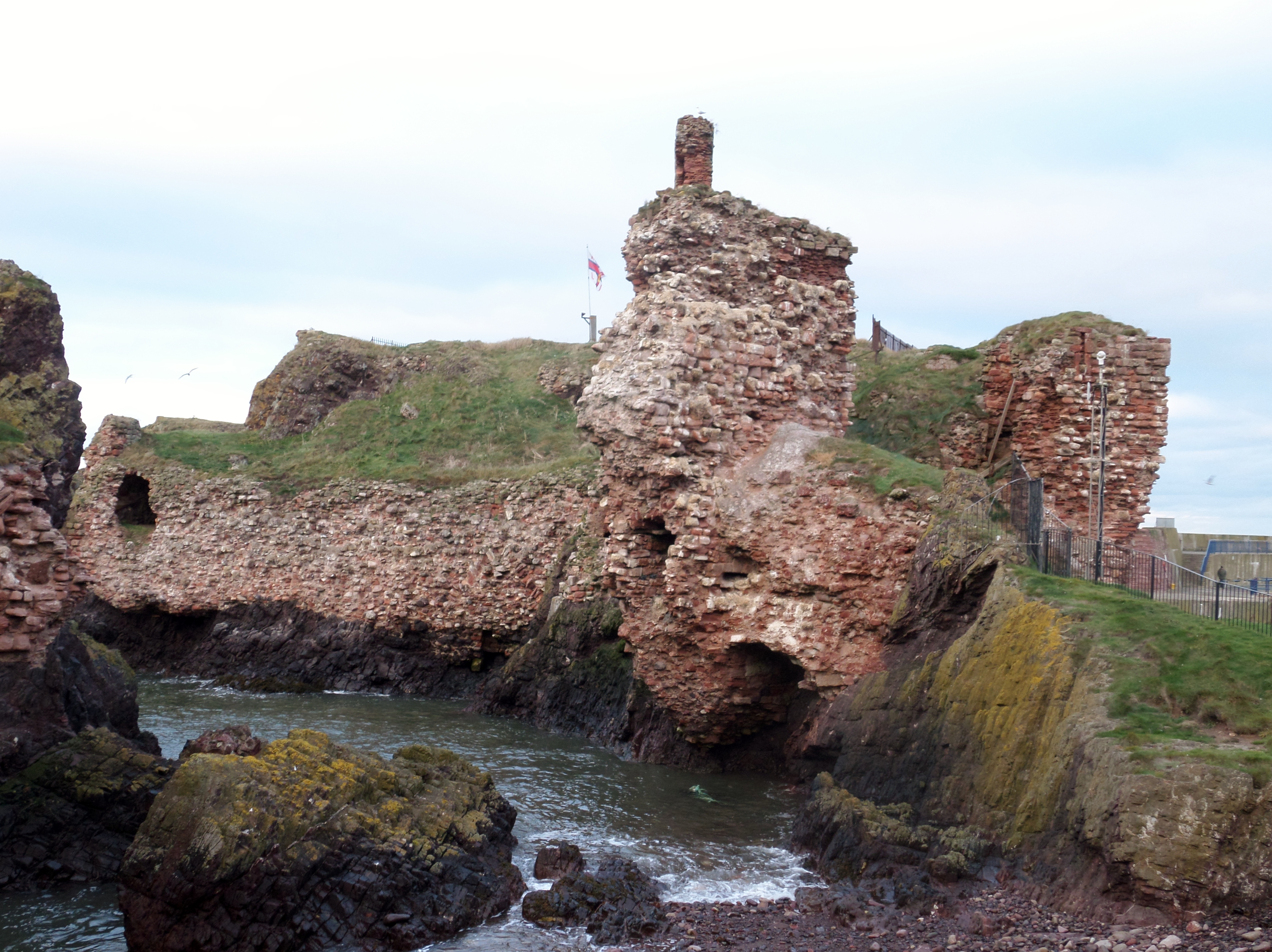
Dunbar Castle

When Mary was returning to the Palace of Holyroodhouse on 24 April she was met by Bothwell to the west of Edinburgh near the River Almond at "Foulbriggis". Mary's party was about 30 horsemen, Bothwell had brought as many as 1,000 men led by Captain William Blackadder. It was said that Bothwell raised his force claiming he was going to capture thieves in far away Liddesdale, but waited at Hatton House instead. He took Mary against her will to Dunbar Castle. Mary was now attended by Bothwell's sister, Jean Hepburn, who had been Mary's sister-in-law, as the wife of John Stewart, Commendator of Coldingham, and by Margaret Beaton, Lady Rires. James Melville wrote that he was taken with Mary "betwen Lithco and Edenbrough" by Captain Blackadder, but remained only a day at Dunbar.

When Mary had rejected Bothwell's first offers of marriage, it seems that he showed her the Ainslie Bond at Dunbar to demonstrate his support from the Scottish nobility and it gave her "cause then to be astonished". On 27 April, a letter was drafted at Aberdour in Fife in the name of her "nobility and subjects" expressing concerns for her safety.

=== Bond for the Queen's Safety ===
On 1 May 1567, a "Bond for the Queen's Safety" was signed at Stirling by the Earls of Atholl, Argyll, Mar, Morton, Sir John Graham, and William Murray of Tullibardine. This was the bond of the Confederate Lords who opposed the marriage. The text of bond survives in a copy among the papers of the Earls of Mar and the names of signatories were also recorded in a letter. At Berwick, William Drury heard that the Lords at Stirling intended to crown James if the wedding went ahead. Drury heard that Mary had sent them a message from Dunbar that she had been "evil and strangely handled" but now had no cause for complaint. Drury sent a man to Dunbar who saw Mary and Bothwell out for a walk accompanied by soldiers.

=== Edinburgh ===
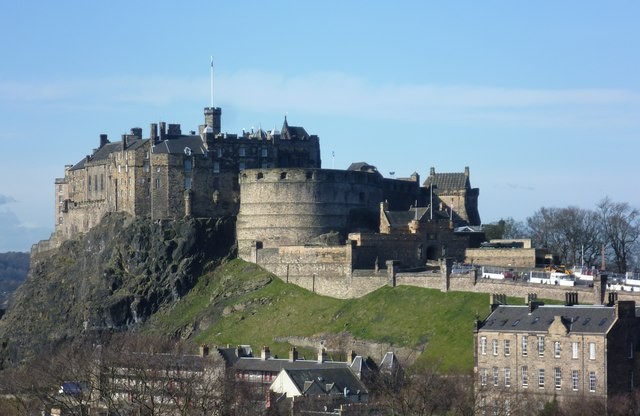
Mary and Bothwell came to Edinburgh Castle on 6 May 1567

Bothwell brought Mary to Edinburgh Castle on 6 May. George Buchanan wrote that Bothwell's men discarded their weapons to show the queen was not a prisoner. The cannons of the castle fired a salute. Mary and Bothwell entered the town by the West Port, like a traditional Royal Entry. It was said he led her horse by the bridle. Mary was lodged in her usual apartments in the castle.

They moved to Holyrood. Mary considered renaming Leith as "Marianbourge" and giving Bothwell the title Duke of Marianbourge. This would have been appropriate, as Leith is the port of Edinburgh and Bothwell was Admiral of Scotland. Mary planned to make Bothwell the "feudal superior" of Leith, a move which disappointed Edinburgh's burgh council. James Melville described a second band of noblemen made in support of the marriage, signed in a chamber in Holyrood Palace.

The marriage banns were read for the first time on 11 May by John Craig, (Craig subsequently described his involvement to the General Assembly). The next day Bothwell was made Duke of Orkney and Lord of Shetland. At a ceremony at Holyrood Palace, Bothwell's friend James Cockburn of Skirling held a banner with his heraldry. James Melville wrote that he spoke with Bothwell at his supper at Holyrood around this time. Bothwell's talk "fell in purpose of gentlewomen, speaking such filthy language" that Melville left the table and went upstairs to see Mary.

== Wedding at Holyrood ==
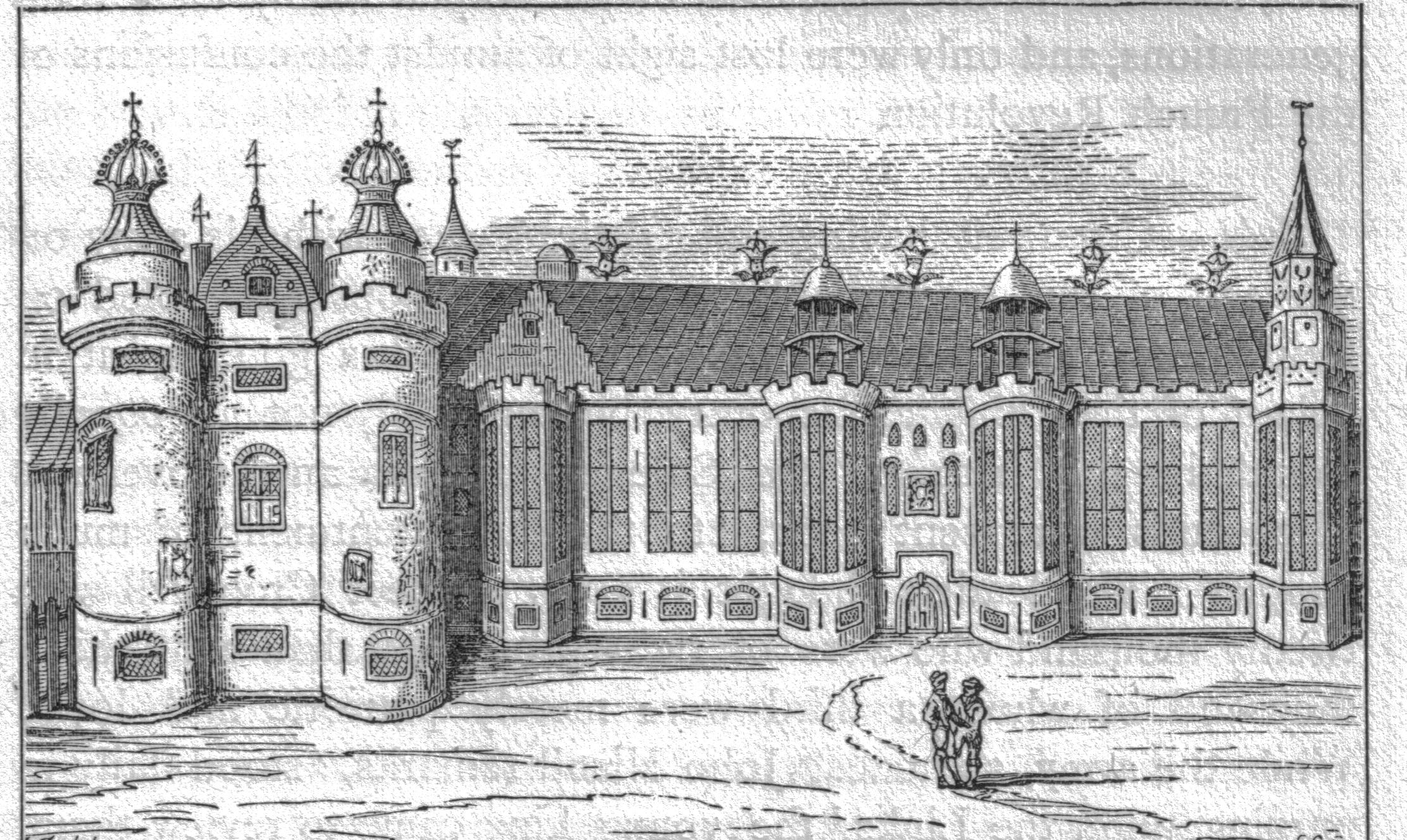
Holyrood Palace

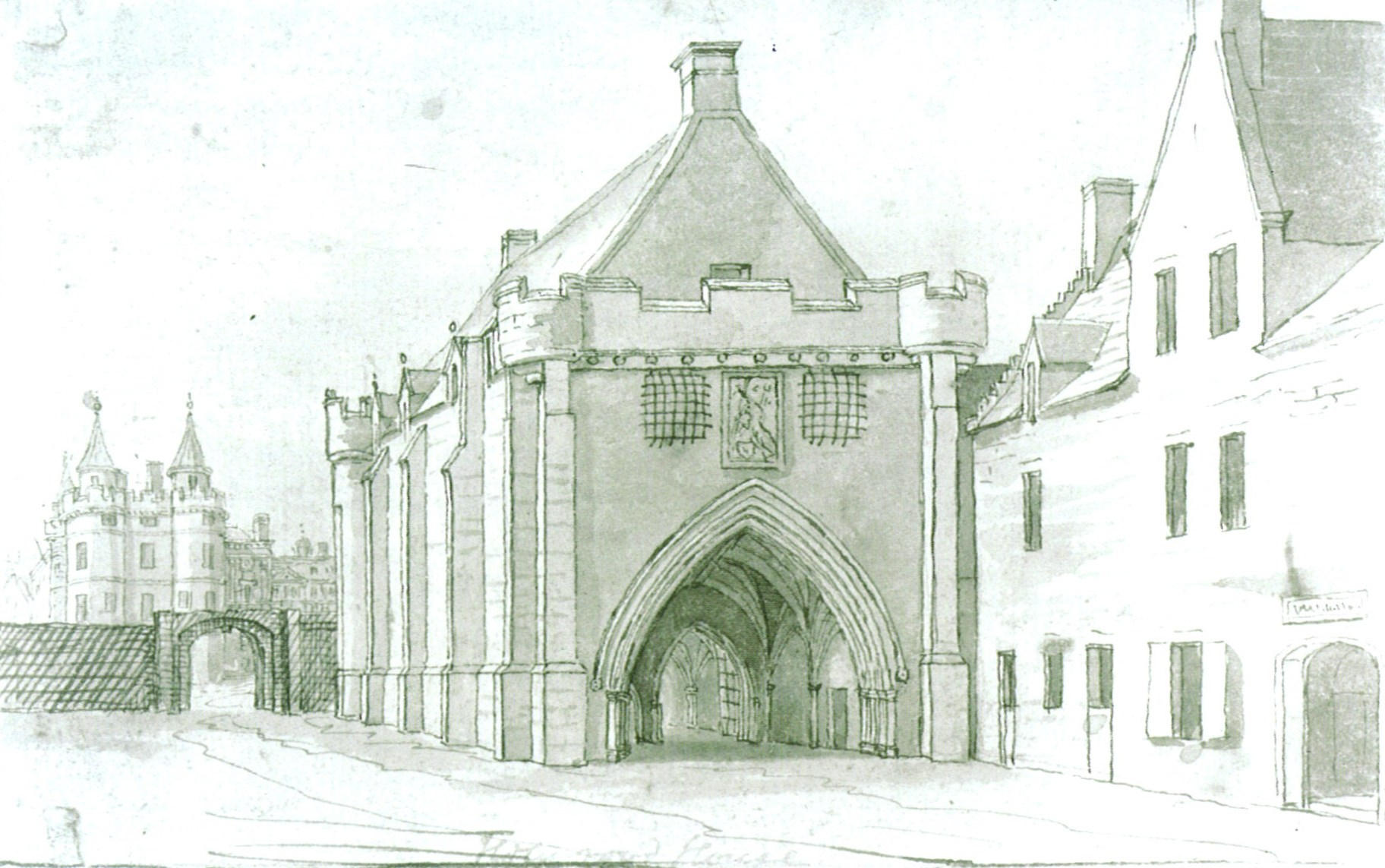
A insulting sign was fixed to the entrance of Holyrood Palace.

The marriage contract was finalised on 14 May 1567. Later, a contract dated 5 April 1567 at Seton Palace was produced with the Casket Letters, but this document is thought to have been a forgery.

The wedding was held in the Great Hall or Council Chamber of Holyrood Palace on 15 May 1567. It was a Protestant ceremony and Adam Bothwell, Bishop of Orkney, was the celebrant. Mary wore a black gown with gold trim and then changed into yellow. The French ambassador Philibert du Croc was at the palace on the day but did not attend the ceremony or the subsequent banquet.

Some accounts say there was a second Catholic ceremony in the palace chapel. One source for this is known as "Regent Moray's journal", which says they were married "efter baith the sortis of the kirkis, reformit and unreformit". At the wedding banquet or feast at Holyrood, Mary and Bothwell sat the same table, arranged so that Mary was at the upper end and Bothwell the lower.

The absence of new costume recorded in the accounts or other preparations seems to suggest a sense of apathy on the part of Mary. The gown of yellow silk was newly lined with white taffeta and Hormuz silk and the black velvet gown lined with taffeta, and two pairs of gloves were bought. Mary also bought a new outfit for her fool, the entertainer James Geddie. The page Nicolas Hubert ("French Paris") mentioned that a cupboard of silver plate engraved with the arms of prince James was repurposed with Bothwell's arms. Mary was said to have given Bothwell jewels worth 20,000 French crowns. Her wardrobe account records that she gave him genet fur saved from an old cloak that had belonged to her mother Mary of Guise.

Writing later, in the context of seeking an annulment, John Lesley wrote that Mary weeped in her chamber at Holyrood with some of the lords who had opposed the marriage. Lesley said she showed him signs of repentance for actions opposed to the rites of the church. He attributed events to the confused state of the Queen's mind caused by Bothwell's use of "magical arts".

A sign was found fixed the next day at the gates of Holyrood Palace with a line of Latin poetry Mense malas Majo nubere vulgus ait. The quotation from Ovid's Fasti means "Folk say bad women marry in May".

The Confederate Lords claimed that Bothwell restricted access to Mary by stationing armed men at the chamber doors. Audiences with the Queen were held in Bothwell's presence. It was reported that Mary was often in tears. Du Croc said Mary and Bothwell were in a cabinet room at Holyrood on 17 May and she was heard to call for a servant to bring a knife so she could kill herself. James Melville reported that Mary asked for a knife and talked of jumping out of window or drowning herself. Festivities were delayed until about a week after the wedding, when, according to William Drury, there was a triumph and tilt and Bothwell "ran at the ring" at Leith on 23 May.

For a time the ordinary business of government resumed with meetings of the Privy Council, now dominated by Bothwell's faction. Cornelius de Vos and his business partners, two London merchants Anthony Hickman and John Achillay, gained a permit to work salt at Newhaven from Mary and Bothwell on 24 May. James Cockburn was made Comptroller of Scotland replacing William Murray of Tullibardine, an important move to secure the finances of the royal household. A proclamation was made against counterfeit two penny hardhead coins. Mary and Bothwell planned to go to Melrose and hold justice courts to restore order in Liddesdale.

== Responses ==
Diplomats were instructed to carry news of the wedding to foreign courts. William Chisholm, Bishop of Dunblane, went to France. Mary was reported to have warmed to Bothwell at Dunbar, excusing the "boldness he had taken to convoy us to one of our own houses, whereunto he was driven by force, as well constrained by love, the vehemency whereof had caused him to set apart the reverence which naturally as our subject he bore to us". Robert Melville went England, with a narrative focused on Parliament's approval of Bothwell, and some pointers for queries that Mary's "gude sister" Elizabeth I might raise. The response to the news abroad was lukewarm or negative.

Some of the Scottish lords who had signed the Ainslie Band in support of the marriage were now beginning to work against Bothwell. Another band made after the wedding by the Confederate Lords on 6 June attracted more supporters to this group, and made an offer to Bothwell's ally James Balfour to surrender Edinburgh Castle to them.

=== Pope Pius V and the threat of excommunication against Mary ===
In Rome, Pope Pius V showed strong disapproval at the marriage between Mary and a Protestant and threatened to excommunicate the Queen. Michele Bonelli, Cardinal Allesandrino, reported that the Pope was reluctant to communicate with Mary until her behaviour and religious life improved. Eventually, tensions eased, and the Pope abandoned his threat of excommunication against Mary.

=== Roche Mamerot ===
In July 1567, Mary's French priest Roche Mamerot arrived in London and spoke with the Spanish ambassador Diego Guzmán de Silva, who sent his opinions to Philip II of Spain. Mamerot had had opposed the marriage. He said that Catholic bishops had advised Mary that she could marry Bothwell because his marriage to Jean Gordon was invalid on account of consanguinuity. He did not agree, but Mary had told him it was best for the Catholic religion that she marry. Mamerot thought Mary's opponents were not trying to avenge the murder of Darnley, and had mostly signed the tavern bond. The Lords who opposed Mary and Bothwell after the wedding had acted against the risk of the re-establishment of Catholic religion in Scotland, and some were also jealous enemies of Bothwell.

== Separated ==
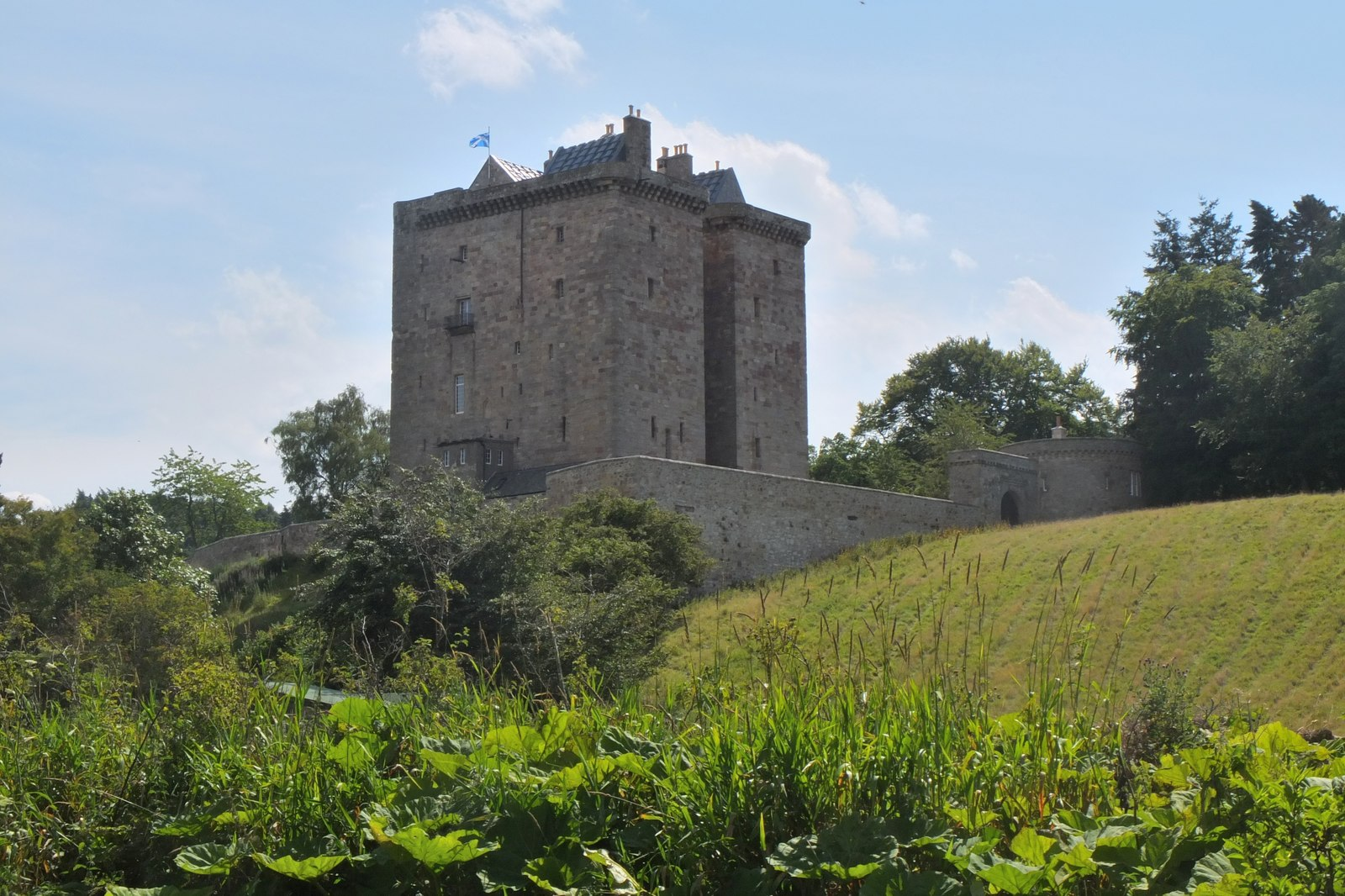
Borthwick Castle

Mary and Bothwell left Edinburgh and went to Borthwick Castle. As the Confederate Lords inceased in strength, Bothwell left for Dunbar. The Confederate Lords, according to Nau, met at Liberton Church, south of Edinburgh. On 11 June, the musician Jacques and his people played while the Confederate Lords entered the town. The Lords intended to punish Darnley's murderers, free Mary and dissolve her marriage to the Duke of Orkney, and support her son, James Stewart, Prince of Scotland. The burgh council of Edinburgh sent their representatives to Mary and Bothwell, and the council record named the Lords and lairds in Edinburgh as Atholl, Montrose, Morton, Mar, Glencairn, Home, Lindsay, Ruthven, Sanquhar, Sempill, Tullibardine, and Grange.

The Lords prevented John Acheson from melting down the font used at the baptism of Prince James to coin money for Mary and Bothwell. Mary sent John Forbes, the young laird of Reres, to Edinburgh Castle, to ask its keeper, James Balfour, to resist the Lords and shoot at them.

Mary and Bothwell were besieged at Borthwick by the Earl of Morton and Lord Home. Mary's supporters sent John Mowbray of Barnbougle to challenge their actions. Both Mary's supporters and the Confederate Lords claimed to be the Privy Council.

The besiegers shouted insults aimed at Bothwell and urged him to answer the challenges. He left the castle and made his way to Dunbar. Mary also escaped dressed, and riding as a man in the evening of 11 June 1567, and rejoined Bothwell at Dunbar early next morning. William Drury at Berwick wrote that it was widely known Mary had to "pass unknown at her coming from Borthwick in man's apparell". Du Croc mentioned the overnight ride in his letter to Catherine de' Medici, leaving the detail of Mary's fashion to the narration of his messenger, but wrote she met Bothwell near Borthwick.

According to a letter of John Beaton, a brother of James Beaton, Archbishop of Glasgow, and a Master of the Royal Household, Mary met Bothwell not far from Borthwick during the night, perhaps at Cakemuir Castle. Beaton rode from Edinburgh with Captain Robert Anstruther, an officer of the Gardes Écossaises, to join Mary at Dunbar. Anstruther was the "Captain of Inchkeith", whose report (written in or translated into French) became an important source for these events. Several historians identified its author as a French servant of Bothwell. When the Captain of Inchkeith arrived at Dunbar, he saw Mary wearing a red skirt that only covered half her leg, une cotte rouge qui ne luy venoyt que à demie de la jambe.

John Beaton was sent back from Dunbar to persuade James Balfour, keeper of Edinburgh Castle to continue to hold it for Mary and Bothwell, but was arrested by the Lairds of Tullibardine and Rosyth twenty paces from the castle gate. The next day he managed to meet James Balfour but found his responses to the Queen's requests were very cold.

At the battle of Carberry Hill, Mary and Bothwell had 200 soldiers armed with hagbut firearms commanded by Alexander Stewart and Hew Lauder of the Queen's Archers, or as David Calderwood says, by Captain Anstruther. After a lengthy stand off, Bothwell left the field. Mary surrendered to the Confederate Lords. William Drury sent William Cecil a sketch of the Lords' banner and described Mary's appearance, her "apparel in the field upon Sunday was after the attyre and fashion of the women of Edinburgh, in a red petticoat, sleeves tied with points, a partlyte, a velvet hat, and muffler". Drury wrote that "Though her body be restrained, yet her heart is not dismayed".

James Melville wrote that Mary bribed one her keepers in Edinburgh to send a letter for Bothwell at Dunbar, which called him "Dear heart" and declared she would not abandon him. Instead the keeper gave the letter to the Lords. Melville alleged that this letter contributed to their decision to imprison Mary at Lochleven Castle. Mary was taken to Lochleven Castle on 17 June to "sequestrate her person for a season" from the company of her husband.

Bothwell travelled first to the north of Scotland, then Shetland. On 15 August 1567, at Sumburgh Head, Bothwell hired a ship called the Pelican from Girard Hemlin or Hemelinck of Bremen, and left his treasure ship with the jewels and silver plate that Mary had given him at the harbour of Scalloway. He then sailed to Denmark where he was imprisoned, and Anna Throndsen claimed he was her husband.

=== Proclamations of the Confederate Lords ===
The Confederate Lords issued three key proclamations responding to the crises of June 1567, which were printed in Edinburgh by Robert Lekprevik as single sided broadsides or broadsheets suitable for public display. The first, declaring martial law, was printed on 11 June when the Lords entered Edinburgh and laid siege to Borthwick Castle. The second, issued on 12 June, condemned the Earl of Bothwell. The third, published on 26 June, called for the capture of Bothwell after Carberry. The text of these proclamations was also copied into the register of the Privy Council of Scotland.

== Lochleven Castle ==
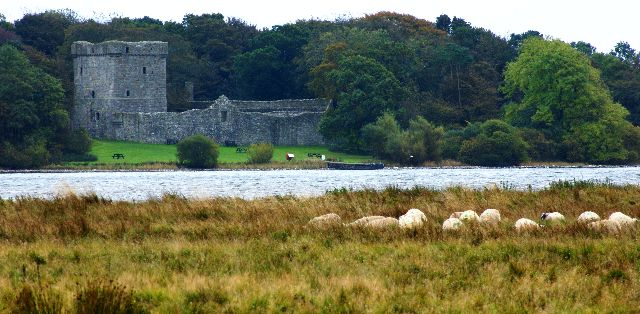
Lochleven Castle, sited on an island in Loch Leven

William Douglas of Lochleven wrote that the lords at Carberry had decided to convey Mary to remain at Lochleven only for "ane schort tyme". John Beaton heard she would be held captive until Bothwell was captured or gone abroad.

On 12 July, at Fast Castle, William Maitland of Lethington told Nicholas Throckmorton that French diplomats would take Mary to live in exile in a French abbey. In Edinburgh, Throckmorton was told that Mary was well, but not inclined to "abandon the lord Bodwell for her husbande, but avowethe constantlye that she wyll lyve and dye with hym", and given the choice would relinquish crown and kingdom "to lyve as a symple damosell with hym". A few days later, Throckmorton heard that Mary was now more interested in the French plan, to "live in a close nunnery in France, or with the old dowager of Guise, her grandmother", as her captors had put her "in great fear of her life".

Throckmorton also heard a rumour that Bothwell had been to Huntly Castle after the battle of Carberry, the home of Jean Gordon's brother George Gordon, 5th Earl of Huntly. Huntly did not offer to help Bothwell, considering it better that "Bothwell should miscarry, to rid the queen and his sister of so wicked a husband". Bothwell moved from Huntly to Spynie Palace. Throckmorton sent messages advising and urging Mary to declare she would disavow Bothwell as her husband, which he thought would best please her captors. She was reluctant and sent a message that she was seven weeks pregnant.

When Mary abdicated on 24 July, according to Claude Nau's narrative, she had recently had a miscarriage of twins, her sons by Bothwell, c'estoit son avortement de deux enfans qu'elle avoit du conte de Bothuel. Her son James was crowned at the Church of the Holy Rude on 29 July 1567.

== Divorce and nullification ==
While Mary was at Lochleven there were rumours that she planned to marry George Douglas or Lord Methven, a candidate said to be suitable to Regent Moray. Mary escaped from Lochleven, but her forces were defeated at the battle of Langside and she went to England. In July 1568, the Spanish ambassador in London, Diego Guzmán de Silva, noted that now her marriage to Bothwell was attributed to compulsion and fear. He thought Elizabeth I would try to prevent Mary marrying a French husband and that it would be in Elizabeth's interest to manage Mary's return to Scotland.

=== Thomas Howard, Duke of Norfolk ===
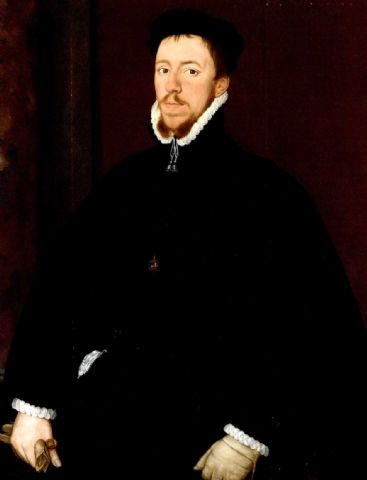
If Mary got a divorce, she could marry Thomas Howard, 4th Duke of Norfolk.

In 1569 and 1571, Mary tried to get a divorce from Bothwell, in order to marry the Thomas Howard, 4th Duke of Norfolk. The Hamilton family had an alternative candidate for her fourth husband, Lord John, Commendator of Arbroath, (John Hamilton, 1st Marquess of Hamilton), the second son of the Duke of Châtellerault. Charles IX of France lent support to the Hamilton plan. In October 1568, both the Duke of Norfolk and Francis Knollys, Mary's custodian at Bolton Castle were aware that Mary entertained the idea of a Hamilton marriage.

A commission for divorce in 1569 prepared at Wingfield Manor in May 1569 stated that Bothwell's divorce from Jean Gordon was invalid, and there was a degree of affinity between Mary and Bothwell. The commission was witnessed by Lord Boyd, John Beaton, James Borthwick, Secretary Raulet, and James Boyd of Kippis. According to Laurence Banister, the Earl of Norfolk's servant, Norfolk considered Mary's marriage to Bothwell was invalid, because Bothwell was still married to Jean Gordon.

In 1569, the plan for Mary to marry the Duke of Norfolk made some sense, and offered advantages for English policy if she was returned to Scotland. At the heart of its "commodity" was the observation that if Mary were married to Norfolk, she could not marry a foreign Catholic prince. Mary drafted proposals for the Parliament of Scotland. However, Regent Moray was becoming lukewarm about Mary's return. Meanwhile, Elizabeth I seems to have been unaware of any plan for Mary and Norfolk to marry until as late as 9 September 1569, when Cecil wrote to William Drury at Berwick, describing her "vehemency" and ordering him to go to Scotland and speak with Moray about the project.

In July 1569, Lord Boyd brought Mary's proposal or commission for a divorce to a meeting of the Scottish Privy Council and Estates at Perth. William Maitland of Lethington and James MacGill debated the issue, MacGill contended she should have no answer. The convention held a vote and decided by a large majority against pursuing the divorce. The convention also rejected a proposal that Mary should be returned to rule in Scotland conjointly with James. Later developments of this scheme would be known as the "Association".

In September 1569, when Elizabeth I wanted to discover more about the Norfolk marriage plan, Moray met Hunsdon at Kelso. Moray said that when he was at York and Hampton Court he had mentioned Mary's marriage as a possibility to Norfolk, if Bothwell was executed or Mary lawfully divorced. Moray said he had not made any further moves, but he knew that Mary's supporters were keen and a messenger called Thomas Flemming had spread exaggerated rumours. Hunsdon was then sent as a formal diplomat to Scotland to assure Moray that she would not allow the marriage. He was to discuss Mary's possible return if a number of Scottish aristocrats were held as hostages in England to guarantee her safety.

Early in 1570, Francis Walsingham published A Discourse Touching The Pretended Match against the marriage. The Discourse argues that Mary ought not to make a "home match" to an English husband, as this could potentially trouble the English state. John Lesley's response was to issue a work first printed in London by Alexander Harvey (including input from Lord Boyd and Loyd Herries), and then revised as A Treatise Concerning The Defence of the Princess Mary, Queen of Scotland. Lesley's Scottish prose was revised by his physician Dr Good, and Charles Bailly managed the publication of The Defence in Liège. Lesley's work aims to rebut several allegations against Mary and her supposed collusion in Bothwell's divorce, and discredit her enemies and the deceased Regent Moray.

=== Norfolk's diamond ===
Norfolk was executed in June 1572, after the Ridolfi Plot. He had sent Mary a diamond jewel or ring. In November 1586, she sent the diamond to the Spanish ambassador Bernardino de Mendoza, writing that it had been Norfolk's pledge of faith or troth to her (dont le seu duc de Norfolk m'obligea sa foi) and she had worn it always since. Mary's apothecary Pierre Gorion brought the ring to Mendoza after her execution. It was said be worth 200 crowns. Gorion carried a second diamond, Mary's gift for Philip II, said to be her best jewel and worth 850 crowns.

=== Evidence for a nullification ===
Pius V began a process of nullification. In 1574, Mary discussed marrying John of Austria and again sought an annulment of her marriage to Bothwell. John Lesley went to Rome, and made a submission claiming the marriage was invalid, ad illud dirimendum, which could imply that it was thought null because of an obstacle such as the abduction and rape at Dunbar.

Witness statements for the process were taken in Paris in August and September 1575, from Cuthbert Ramsay, brother of the laird of Dalhousie, James Curle, former customs officer of Edinburgh, and the French soldier and clerk Sebastian Davelourt (or Danelour). They recalled Mary's messenger James Borthwick coming to Edinburgh with her plea for help when Bothwell took her to Dunbar in April 1567. Borthwick, described as a noble or equerry, was Mary's page in 1567 and was later her envoy to the French and English court. Cuthbert Ramsay said he had spoken to one of suspects in the murder of Darnley, John Hepburn, who told him he had pushed Bothwell to safety at the Kirk o'Field. James Curle said Mary and Bothwell had sat at the same table at their wedding banquet, Mary at the upper end. Sebastian Danelour was Edinburgh's commissary clerk and had some knowledge of Bothwell's divorce from Jean Gordon. The main ground for annulment in these statements was that Mary and Jean Gordon were closely related. Before any further divorce proceedings, Bothwell died at Dragsholm Castle in April 1578.

== Documents ==
As the new regime in Scotland sought to justify its rule and shift blame for events to Queen Mary, a number of documents were produced and some were shown by James Stewart, 1st Earl of Moray to Elizabeth's commissioners at the York and Westminster Conferences in 1568 including the Casket Letters. There was a contract for the marriage of Mary and Bothwell made at Seton Palace on 5 April, which seems to be a fake. A narrative of events, known as the "Book of Articles", describes the "inordinate affection" of Mary and Bothwell before Darnley's murder, including a liaison which involved Mary climbing a garden wall in the Canongate with Lady Rires, and says that Bothwell "conveyed her in haste to Dunbar castle, where he plainly past to bed with her, abusing her body at his pleasure".

Later, during the Marian Civil War, Alexander Hay of Easter Kennett wrote to John Knox saying he had secured documents for the King's cause. He mentioned the publication of works by George Buchanan critical of Mary. Further papers included the processes of divorce between the Earl of Bothwell and Jean Gordon, the banns for Mary's marriage to Bothwell, her declaration that she married of her own free will, and he had many other documents to place at Knox's disposal.
