= Alexander Hay (died 1594) =

Scottish lawyer and politician

Alexander Hay of Easter Kennet (died 1594) was a Scottish lawyer and politician. Hay's name is associated with a manuscript now held by the British Library.

== Career ==
Sometimes known as "Sanders Hay", he was clerk to the Privy Council of Scotland from March 1564, Director of Chancery and Keeper of the Quarter Seal in 1567, and Clerk of Register in October 1579 after the death of James MacGill. His lands were at Kennet in Clackmannanshire.

Following the murder of Lord Darnley, and the marriage of Mary, Queen of Scots, to the Earl of Bothwell, and the battle of Carberry Hill, Hay composed a band on 16 June 1567 narrating Bothwell's crimes and urging his capture.

Hay attended the conferences in York in 1568 discussing the issues around the deposed Mary, Queen of Scots. A list of evidence and charges against Mary supplied to Queen Elizabeth's delegation is known as Hay's articles, or the "Book of Articles". Hay also made a notarial copy of the deposition or confession of Nicolas Hubert alias French Paris concerning the murder of Lord Darnley.

In November 1570 he wrote to Earl of Mar at Stirling Castle describing his recent conversation with the English ambassador Thomas Randolph. He heard that Margaret Fleming, Countess of Atholl had sent a jewel to Mary, Queen of Scots, but it had been intercepted and given to Queen Elizabeth. The jewel was no bigger than the palm of a man's hand and made "in form of a heirse of harthorne", well-decked with gold and enamelled. It depicted an enthroned queen with a rampant lion worrying a leopard, with the inscription, "Fall what may fall, the lion shall be lord of all". The discovery was to be kept secret. Richard Bannatyne, a secretary of John Knox, also described the jewel, thought to allude to the English succession, in his memoir.

Hay wrote, probably to John Knox, from Leith in December 1571 listing documents he had secured for the King's cause. He also mentioned the publication of works by George Buchanan critical of Mary. He had secured further papers, including the processes of divorce between the Earl of Bothwell and Jean Gordon, the banns for Mary's marriage to Bothwell and her declaration that she married of her own free will, and had many other documents to place at Knox's disposal.

In 1577 Hay wrote a description of the Scottish nobility, briefly detailing their ages and landholdings. This survey was probably for the benefit of an English diplomat. The ambassador Robert Bowes and his servant George Nicholson kept armorials and genealogical manuscripts in their Edinburgh lodging. In 1606 Hay's manuscript was owned by John Withie (d. 1677), a London heraldry painter.

Hay was made Lord Clerk Register in October 1579 after the death James MacGill. In November 1580 Edinburgh town council decided to make him a gift of two silver cups with his name engraved on them.

== Hay and the royal voyages ==
When James VI and John Maitland of Thirlestane went to Norway to meet Anne of Denmark in 1589, Hay was temporarily Secretary. James VI wrote to him, probably in December 1591, asking him to make sure exchequer officials and administrators attended to royal business and the management of his household. The letter refers to the dowry of Anne of Denmark, a part of which was loaned as an investment to the burgh council of Edinburgh.

In December 1593, Hay was appointed to a committee to audit the account of money spent by Maitland on the royal voyages. The funds in question came from the English subsidy and the dowry of Anne of Denmark.

== Death ==
Alexander Hay died on 19 September 1594. He was buried at Holyrood Abbey. According to a note in the manuscript "Books of Sederunt" in the National Records of Scotland, he died "schortlie after the baptism of the Prince by excessive paines and travellis tane by him at the time, immediately before and at the tyme of the baptisme". Hay's involvement included writing letters jointly with Walter Stewart of Blantyre asking for provisions for Henry's baptism.

== Hopetoun manuscript ==
A collection of papers formerly in the library at Hopetoun House and now held by the British Library appears to be part of Hay's administrative paperwork. The manuscript includes material connected with the York conference, coinage, the English subsidy of James VI, cost-saving measures for the royal household in 1591, and gifts received at the baptism of Prince Henry. A transcript of the document was made in 19th-century and is held by the National Records of Scotland. The original volume has been digitised.
