= Book of Articles =

The Book of Articles is a list of allegations against Mary, Queen of Scots and James Hepburn, 4th Earl of Bothwell. The document was produced for the Westminster Conference in December 1568. The manuscript, held by the British Library, was written by Alexander Hay of Easter Kennett, and is sometimes known as Hay's Articles. The material resembles George Buchanan's published Detection and his Indictment of Mary. The text was published by John Hosack in 1869.

A comparable document, held by Cambridge University Library, is known as Buchanan's "Indictment". The material may have been first composed in Latin and sent by Regent Moray to William Cecil, 1st Baron Burghley. The historian John Guy calls this body of evidence against Mary "Buchanan's dossier".

== Allegations ==
The Book of Articles has five sections. The first section describes the deterioration of Mary's relationship with Henry Stuart, Lord Darnley to "extreme disdain" after three months of marriage. Mary had a stamp or "printing iron" made for Danley's signature which was used without his involvement. After the birth of James VI and I, Mary travelled to Alloa Tower without Darnley. In October 1566, Mary was ill at Jedburgh, and the Book of Articles claims that she made Agnes Keith, Countess of Moray pretend to be unwell so that Darnley would not come to the lodging.

The second section outlines Mary's "inordinate affection" for Bothwell. She gave him lands, and then spent time with him in 1566 when she stayed in Exchequer House in Edinburgh's Cowgate and at John Balfour's house in the Canongate. Lady Rires brought Bothwell to her. Mary and Margaret Carwood helped Lady Rires scale a wall. Mary rode see Bothwell at Hermitage Castle when he was ill. For the baptism of James VI, she started to build a passage between her lodgings at Stirling Castle and Bothwell's.

The third section alleges a conspiracy for the "horrible murder" of Lord Darnley. Mary was said to have first considered a divorce. Darnley's illness while travelling to Glasgow is said to be the result of poisoning. When Darnley came to the lodging at the Kirk o' Field in Edinburgh, she dined with Bothwell at Balfour's house. Her servant French Paris alias Nicolas Hubert brought gunpowder to Darnley's lodging.

The fourth section describes the aftermath of the explosion that killed Darnley. Bothwell brought the news to the queen. An enquiry questioned Thomas Nelson, one of Darnley's servants. There were celebrations for the wedding of Margaret Carwood instead of mourning. Darnley was buried without ceremony. Mary played golf and pall-mall at Seton Palace with Bothwell. She married Bothwell on 15 May 1567 at Holyrood Palace. The French ambassador Philibert du Croc refused to attend the banquet.

The fifth section discusses the actions taken against Bothwell and Mary. They came to Dunbar Castle on 11 June, the battle of Carberry Hill was fought on 15 June. The recovery of the casket letters from Bothwell's servant George Dalgleish was said to have led to Mary's abdication.
