= Diego Guzmán de Silva =

Spanish canon and diplomat

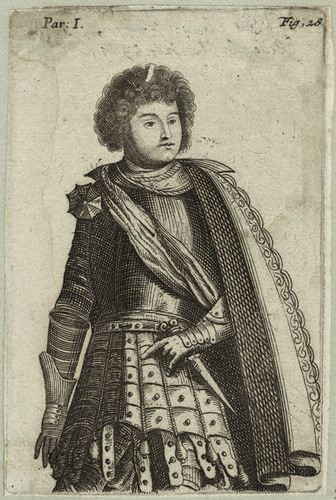
Anonymous engraving of Diego Guzmán de Silva (National Portrait Gallery, London).

Diego Guzmán de Silva (Ciudad Rodrigo, c. 1520 - Venice, 1577) was a Spanish canon and diplomat. He served as ambassador to England (then under Elizabeth I), the Republic of Genoa, and the Republic of Venice.

== Mary, Queen of Scots ==
His reports include news from Scotland, relaying news of the Chaseabout Raid and the English diplomat John Tamworth who was sent to complain about the wedding of Mary, Queen of Scots, and Henry Stuart, Lord Darnley. Guzman saw that Elizabeth I wore a miniature portrait of Mary, Queen of Scots, on a chain at her waist in April 1566.

Robert Melville told De Silva that Mary intended to mourn Darnley in her chamber for forty days. At the end of July 1567, the Earl of Moray, who was in England, told Guzmán de Silva that he had heard of the finding of a letter in Mary's own handwriting to Bothwell which implicated her in the murder of Lord Darnley. He had not revealed this to Queen Elizabeth. De Silva talked with Mary's priest Roche Mamerot, who came to London after the wedding of Mary, Queen of Scots, and the Earl of Bothwell. Mamerot had opposed the marriage.

Guzman wrote a number of letters describing Mary's arrival in England in May 1568, and the efforts of French and Scottish diplomats on her behalf.

== Depictions ==
Guzman is depicted as the ambassador of Spain to Britain during the reign of Edward VI in Becoming Elizabeth. He is portrayed by Olivier Huband.
