= Nicolas Hubert =

Nicolas Hubert alias French Paris (died 1569) was a French servant at the Scottish royal court. He was involved in the murder of Lord Darnley on 10 February 1567, made a confession, and was executed.

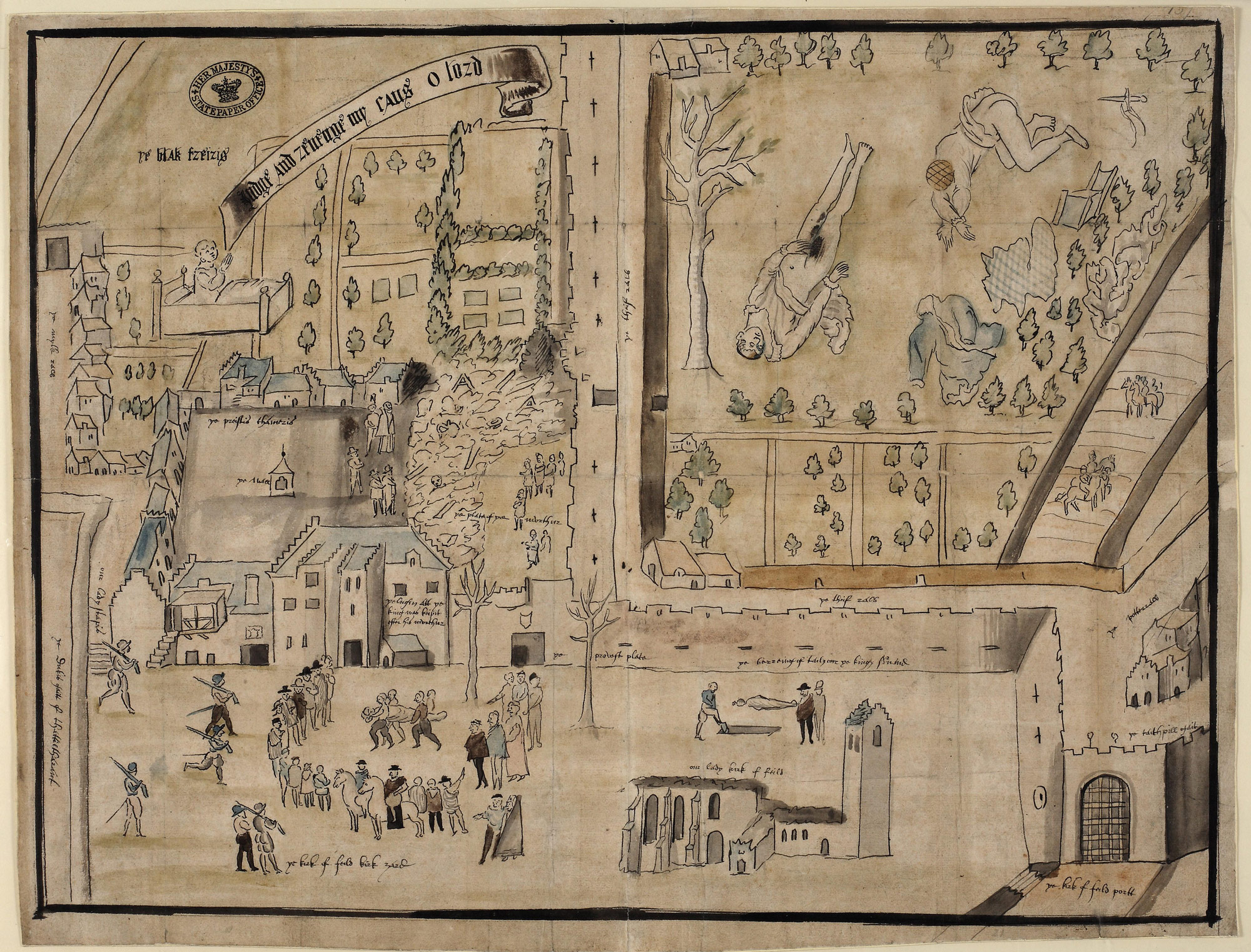
Drawing of the Kirk o' Field murder scene, made for William Cecil

== Career ==
Born in Paris, Hubert is sometimes described as a page to James Hepburn, 4th Earl of Bothwell, and he transferred to the service of Mary, Queen of Scots. He appears in the household roll of February 1567 as "Nicolas Hubert dict Paris", a valet of the chamber. As a member of Mary's household, Hubert and the other valets of the chamber were given Holland linen at Easter 1567.

One summary of the events of February 1567 calls him "Paris, her chalmerchild". The "Book of Articles" refers to "Archibald Betoun and Parice, Frenscheman, the quenis awin cubicularis" and "Parice, her familiar servand in her chalmer". He was said to have obtained keys to the Kirk o'Field lodging, and given access to conspirators bringing gunpowder.

Following Darnley's murder, Bothwell escaped from Scotland by ship after the battle of Carberry Hill. Bothwell had a Danish-born page Herman with him who spoke the Scots language perfectly. An English border official, Sir William Drury, heard a false rumour in June that the "French page" had been drowned. Drury described him ambiguously as "Parys, the Frenche page to the Duke of xx yeres", meaning either he was 20 years old, or had served 20 years as a page. In his confession, Hubert mentions five or six years service.

Hubert was summoned as a traitor with others on 30 September 1567, and condemned by the Parliament of Scotland on 20 December 1567, in absentia. He was in Denmark–Norway. Named in Latin as Paridem Gallum, Hubert was handed to Scottish authorities, represented by Captain Clarke, at Roskilde in October 1568 by Peder Oxe of Gisselfeld, the Danish Rigshofmester. Regent Moray wrote that Hubert arrived at Leith, Edinburgh's port, around the middle of June. Hubert made two confessions at St Andrews Castle before his execution. He was hanged, drawn and quartered on 16 August 1569. His body parts were displayed at Dundee and Perth.

== Confessions and allegations ==
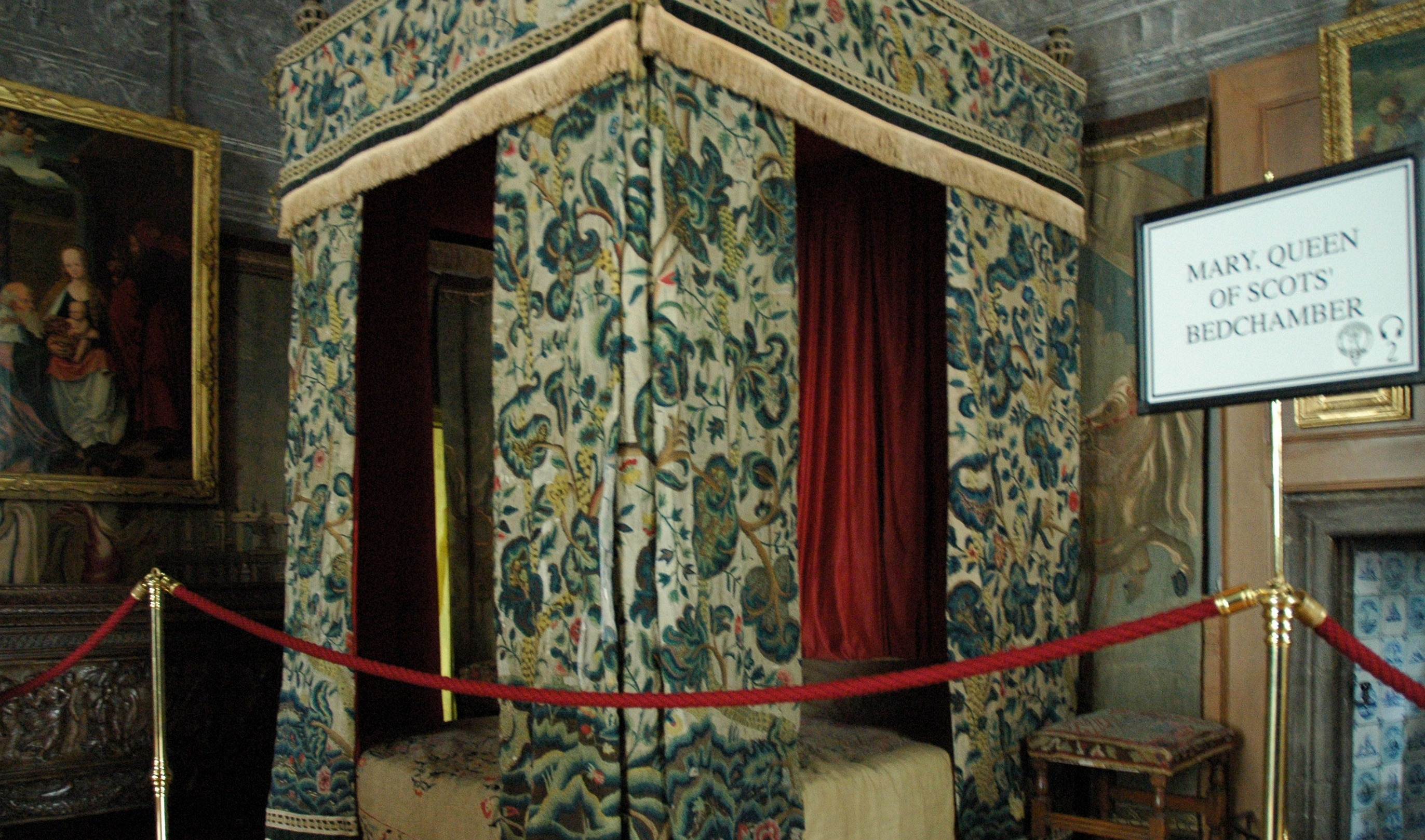
Hubert's confession describes a scene in the Queen's bedchamber at Holyrood Palace

The confessions are frequently cited for the details of the Kirk o' Field lodging and the last days of Lord Darnley. Historians are inclined to doubt some points, particularly material in the second confession.

There are two copies, one in the British Library Cotton manuscripts, attested by Alexander Hay, and another in the National Archives, which states the confession was made in the presence of George Buchanan, Mr John Wood, and Robert Ramsay. The National Archives copy has an "NH" monogram on each folio for Nicolas Hubert, who was asked to certify the original text.

Among the details of the confession, Hubert set up a bed for Mary at the Kirk o'Field. He discussed the keeping of the keys of the lodging with Bothwell during a visit, and showed him the sanitary arrangements. Hubert explained to Bothwell that he was a valet of the chamber and the ushers of the chamber (like Archibald Beaton) were the key holders. Bothwell remarked that he had placed Hubert as a servant in the Queen's chamber, but now he was no help to him.

On the night of the murder Hubert went to lodging to fetch a fur coverlet for Margaret Carwood and spoke to Sandy Durham about the keys. On the Monday morning after the murder, Madame de Briant (Lady Seton) made eggs for breakfast in Queen's bed chamber at Holyrood Palace, and Mary talked privately to Bothwell behind a curtain. Hubert said that Mary asked him to deliver a coffer of her jewels to Bothwell's ally James Cockburn of Skirling at Edinburgh Castle and a cupboard of silverware to Bothwell on the day he was made Duke of Orkney.

Before Bothwell abducted and married Mary, Hubert and James Ormiston of Ormiston (near Hawick) rode from Linlithgow Palace to Hatton House near Wilkieston with a letter from Mary for Bothwell. This detail appears to have been included to show collusion in Mary's abduction by Bothwell, said to have taken place at "Foul Briggis", possibly a location close to Hatton and Kirkliston with bridges over the Almond and Gogar Burn. Another source, known as "Murray's diary", says that Mary came to Linlithgow on 23 April and Bothwell was at "Haltoun, hard by".

Nicolas Hubert was mentioned in allegations made against Mary in England by James Stewart, 1st Earl of Moray and George Buchanan at the York and Westminster Conferences in 1568. He features in one of the casket letters, found in the keeping of George Dalgleish, who was Bothwell's "chalmerchild". The letter mentions that Paris was sent by Mary to fetch something to "amend me", presumably some kind of remedy.

According to the confessions of John Hepburn of Bowton or Bolton and John Hay of Talla or Tallo, and the "Book of Articles", a summary of allegations made against Mary, Hubert was involved in bringing gunpowder to Darnley's lodging by opening the doors to the "nether house":

Bot the keyis of the dur betuix the kingis chalmer and the hous under it quhair the quene lay and quhair the pulder wes put in wer deliverit to Archibald Betoun and Parice Frenscheman the quenis awin cubicularis.

[modernised] But the keys of the door between the King's chamber and the house (room) under it where the powder was put in were delivered to Archibald Beaton and Paris, Frenchman, the queen's own bedchamber servants.

Thomas Nelson explained that Paris and Archibald Beaton held keys to the queen's bed chamber, as she was in the habit of singing in the garden at night with Lady Rires.

John Hay of Talla said he was walking at the foot of an "alley in the yard", a garden path, with Paris when the house blew up on 10 February 1567.
