= Margaret Beaton =

Scottish courtier

Margaret Beaton, Lady Reres (floruit 1560–1580) was a Scottish courtier and companion of Mary of Guise and Mary, Queen of Scots. She was blamed by the enemies of Mary, Queen of Scots, for her involvement in alleged immorality at court.

== Career and rumour ==
Margaret Beaton was a daughter of John Beaton of Creich, Keeper of Falkland Palace and Jane Hay, a daughter of the Provost of Dundee. Mary Beaton, one of Mary, Queen of Scots four companions was her niece, the daughter of her brother Robert Beaton of Creich.

She married Arthur Forbes of Reres or Rires Castle in Kilconquhar, Fife, and was then called "Lady Reres". The place-name was sometimes written "Reresse". On 22 December 1558 Mary of Guise paid her £300.

In September 1566 she was part of the household of James VI of Scotland at Stirling Castle, provided with a bed with curtains made from blue wool cloth called "ostage". Mary sent her two coffers for the prince's chamber. In December 1566 Mary bought her a gown of black velvet with black satin sleeves and skirt front, probably to wear at the baptism of Prince James.

In April 1570 Forbes was involved in the murder of Mr John Wood, secretary of Mary's half-brother Regent Moray. Their son John Forbes was killed in the struggle. Margaret Beaton held a grudge against John Wood's wider family, who lived at Largo. This animosity had led to the allegations against her. Margaret featured in stories about Mary, Queen of Scots, written as propaganda by the queen's enemies, which overshadow the few facts known about her role at court.

Lord Darnley's chamber servant Thomas Nelson said that Mary, Queen of Scots and Lady Reres used to play and sing in the garden at Kirk o'Field at night time. This was his explanation why Mary's servants Archibald Beaton and Nicolas Hubert alias French Paris had keys. Margaret Beaton, her sister Janet Beaton, and Jean Hepburn were said to Mary's attendants at Dunbar Castle, after Bothwell had abducted her, before the battle of Carberry Hill.

George Buchanan wrote that she was old and fat in the 1560s, "a woman very heavy both by unweildy age and massy substance", and had been a mistress of James Hepburn, 4th Earl of Bothwell. He tells a story of Mary and Margaret Carwood helping Lady Reres with her girdle or belt to climb down a garden wall in Edinburgh's Cowgate in order to bring the Earl of Bothwell to a secret liaison with the queen.

This incident or story was also described with more detail at the York Conference in 1568 and recorded in a document called the "Book of Articles";

"In September 1566 she (Mary) being in Mr John Balfour's house in the Canongate and the Exchequer House, Bothwell resorted to her night and day. Her behaviour in the said Exchequer House shows how at that time she abused her body with him, he resorting through Mr David Chalmer's lodging where she lay, conveyed to her by the Lady Rires means, which she herself confessed to diverse people. And especially Bothwell breaking the appointed tryst at one time, and she impatient of his tarry and delay, sent Lady Rires to his chamber for him, which lady passing over the dyke at the nearest, took him out of his bed from his wife and brought him to the queen."

Mary stayed in the Cowgate house where the Court of the Exchequer met for a few days in 1566. The Latin Exchequer Rolls mention that she and her nobles were provided with wine, bread, beer, meat fish, spices, pewter, and napkins.

A summary of arguments against Mary produced in 1568 by William Cecil, 1st Baron Burghley, called the "Contra Reginam Scotorum" asserted that Bothwell obtained his divorce from Jean Gordon because of his "frequent advouterie" – adulteries, especially with Lady Reres. She was also the "principal instrument" between the queen and Bothwell.

One of the Casket Letters mentions a conversation at Callendar House with Lord Livingston, and that Lord Darnley mentioned her. Darnley's comment, that "she should serve her well", was mentioned in Thomas Crawford's declaration.

Richard Bannatyne, the secretary of John Knox, wrote that Mary had an easier childbirth because of the sorcery of Margaret Fleming, Countess of Atholl who transferred the queen's pains to Lady Reres, who was also in childbirth in Edinburgh Castle at the same time. Lady Reres on this occasion was in more pain than during her other pregnancies. Bannatyne says that John Knox heard this story from one Andrew Lundie, who may have been a relation of Forbes of Reres, who said that:

[w]hen the Queen was lying in with the King, the Lady Atholl lying there likewise, both within the castle of Edinburgh, that he came there for some business, and called for the Lady Reres, whom he found in her chamber, lying bedfast; and he asking her of her disease, she answered that she was never so troubled with no bairn (child) that ever she bore, for the Lady Atholl had cast all the pain of her childbirth on her.

In 1573, during the "lang siege" of Edinburgh Castle in the Marian Civil War, Lady Rires, her niece Lady Jean Stewart, and Mary Fleming, William Maitland's wife, stayed in the castle. In 1583, enemies of James Stewart, Earl of Arran, influenced by these stories, compared his wife Elizabeth Stewart, to her as an unsuitable companion for the Scottish royals.

== Family ==
The children of Margaret Beaton and Arthur Forbes included:

- John Forbes (died 1570), who was with Mary, Queen of Scots, before Carberry in 1567. He married Barbara Sandilands, a daughter of Sandilands of Saint Monans, who had been a lady in waiting to Mary of Guise. They divorced in 1564. Their daughters included Christian, Dorothy, and Janet Forbes.
- Archibald or Arthur Forbes
