= Murder of Lord Darnley =

1567 murder in Edinburgh, Scotland

Coordinates: 55°56′50″N 3°11′11″W

The murder of Henry Stuart, Lord Darnley, second husband of Mary, Queen of Scots, took place on 10 February 1567 in Edinburgh, Scotland. Darnley's lodgings were destroyed by gunpowder; his body and that of his servant were found nearby, apparently having been strangled rather than killed in the explosion. Suspicion was placed upon Queen Mary and the Earl of Bothwell, whom Mary went on to marry three months after Darnley's murder. Bothwell was indicted for treason and acquitted, but six of his servants and acquaintances were subsequently arrested, tried, and executed for the crime.

== Location ==
Darnley was murdered at the "Old Provost's House" of the Kirk o' Field (formally, St Mary in the Fields). The kirk was named for its original situation outside the early town walls, in fields to the south of Edinburgh. The Old Provost's House was built against the Flodden wall. James Hamilton, Duke of Châtellerault, built a mansion on the site of the kirk's hospital in around 1552, this became known as the Duke's Lugeing (lodging), or Hamilton House.

The lands at Kirk o' Field were later granted to the city by charters from King James VI in 1582, specifically for the foundation of a new university, the Tounis College. Hamilton House was then incorporated as the first major building of the University of Edinburgh. The Old Provost's House was adjacent to the Flodden Wall, and is generally thought to have stood at the current south east corner of the Old College, at the junction between South College Street and South Bridge (the National Museum of Scotland is sited to the west of the Old College). There were archaeological investigations of the area following the Cowgate fire of 2002.

== Assassination ==
On his return to Edinburgh with Queen Mary early in 1567, Darnley took residence in the Old Provost's lodging, a two-storey house within the church quadrangle. The house was owned by Robert Balfour, whose brother Sir James Balfour was a prominent councillor of Queen Mary. Adjacent was the lodging of James Hamilton, Duke of Châtellerault. At first Darnley's household thought he would be accommodated in the Hamilton Lodging.

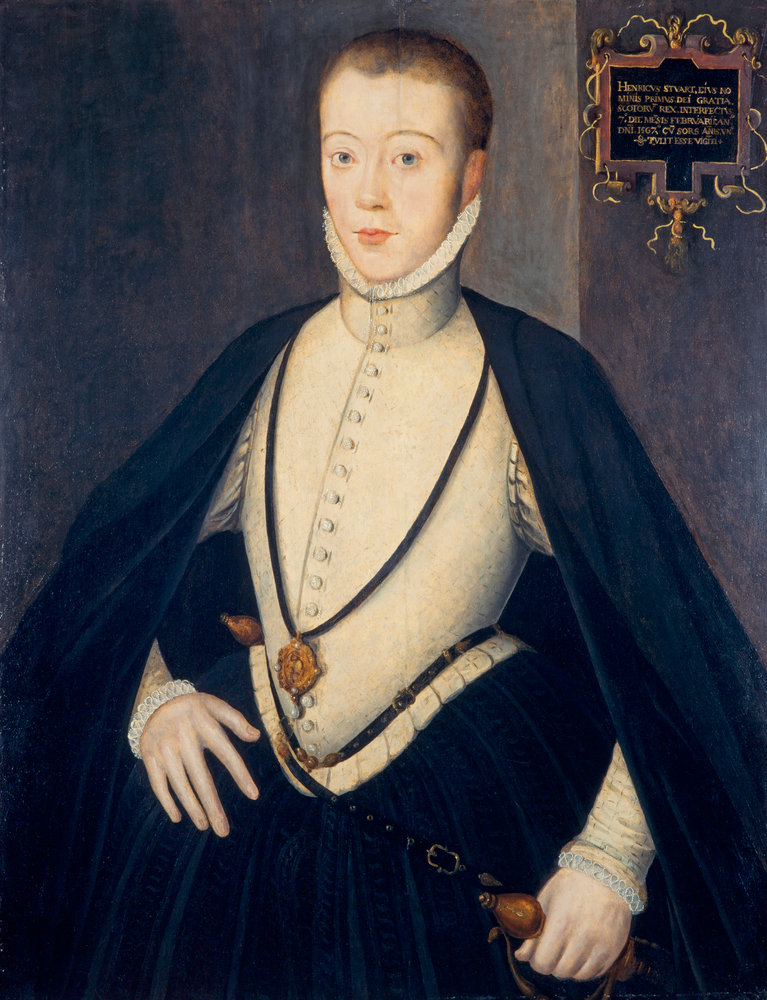
Lord Darnley in his late teens, by an unknown artist. National Galleries of Scotland.

Mary, Queen of Scots visited Darnley from Holyroodhouse. His chamber servant Thomas Nelson mentioned how the queen and Margaret Beaton, Lady Reres would play and sing in the garden at night time. On the night that Darnley was killed, Mary attended the wedding banquet and masque for her servant Bastian Pagez and Christily Hog at Holyrood, and then visited the Kirk o' Field lodging. According to one narrative of the events, Mary was dressed in men's clothing on that night, "which apparel she loved oftentimes to be in, in dancings secretly with the King her husband, and going in masks by night through the street". Costumed performances at weddings were not unusual at the Scottish court. A contemporary Italian account mentions that Mary visited Darnley that night wearing a mask.

Early in the morning of 10 February, the house was destroyed by a gunpowder explosion. The partially clothed bodies of Darnley and his servant were found in a nearby orchard, apparently either smothered or strangled but unharmed by the explosion. Another servant was killed in the house by the explosion. The blast was so powerful that, according to the Privy Council:

The house quhair umquhill the Kingis Grace wes ludgeit, wes in ane instant blawin up in the air, he slepand in his bed for the tyme, with sic a force and vehemency, that of the haill ludgeing, walles and uthir, thair is na thing left unruinated, and doung in drosse to the verie ground stane.

Translation:

The house where the late King's Grace was lodged, was in an instant blown up in the air, he sleeping in his bed at the time, with such a force and vehemency, that of the whole lodgings, walls and other, there is nothing left which is not ruined and struck down in fragments to the very foundation stone.

Three witnesses made sworn statements on the following day. Barbara Mertine said she was looking out of the window of her house in Friar's Wynd, and heard 13 men go through the Friar Gate into Cowgate and up Friar's Wynd. Then she heard the explosion, the "craik", and 11 more men went by. She shouted after them that they were traitors after an "evill turn". May Crokat lived opposite Mertine, under the Master of Maxwell's lodging. Crokat was in bed with her twins and heard the explosion. She ran to the door in her shirt and saw the 11 men. Crokat grabbed at one man and asked about the explosion, receiving no answer. John Petcarne, a surgeon who lived in the same street heard nothing, but was summoned to attend Francisco de Busso, an Italian servant of Queen Mary.

Later, James Melville of Halhill wrote that a page said Darnley was taken out of the house before the explosion and was choked to death in a stable with a serviette in his mouth, then left under a tree. Melville went to Holyroodhouse the next day and spoke to the Earl of Bothwell, who told him that thunder or a flash had come out of the sky, saying "souder came out of the luft", and burnt the house and there was "not a hurt nor a mark" on the body. Melville said that the royal servant Alexander Durham (of Duntarvie) kept the body and stopped him seeing it.

On 12 February the Privy Council issued a proclamation that the first to reveal the names of the conspirators and participants in the murder would be pardoned, if they were involved, and have a reward of £2,000.

== Aftermath ==
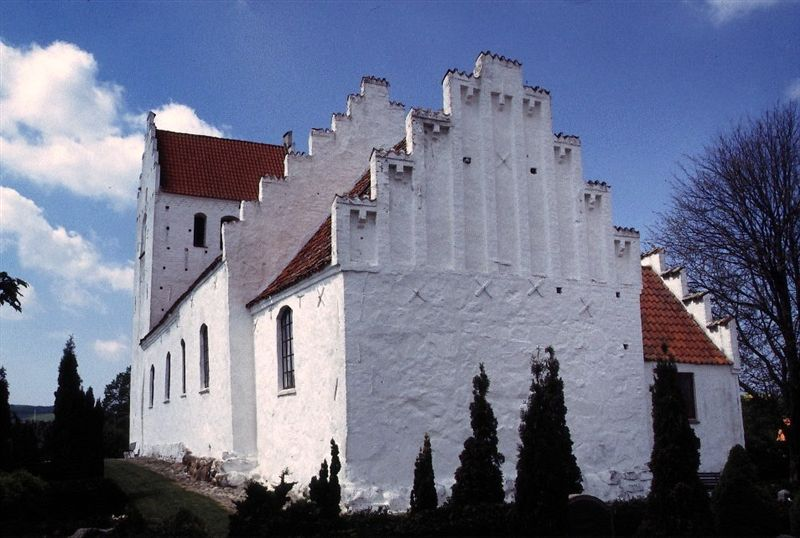
Accused of the murder, the Earl of Bothwell escaped to Norway, but was imprisoned for the rest of his life at Dragsholm in Denmark and buried at Fårevejle Church, shown above.

According to his statement, the next morning the queen's servant Nicolas Hubert, known as French Paris, came to the queen's bedchamber at Holyrood Palace to hang her bed with black curtains for mourning and light candles in the "ruelle", a space between the bed and the wall. A lady in waiting, Madame de Bryant gave him a fried egg for his breakfast. He noticed her speaking privately with James Hepburn, 4th Earl of Bothwell, concealed behind a curtain.

The town treasurer of Edinburgh, John Weston, was asked to organise building works at the "provestis logeing of the Kirk of Feild" on 11 February 1567, including the removal and infilling of the back doorway through the town wall. He died later in the month and the work was continued in May by the new treasurer John Harwod who rebuilt the town wall by the lodging.

Darnley's father, the Earl of Lennox, wrote to Queen Mary asking for a trial. His letters of 17 March 1566 list the names of suspects whose names had been written on "tickets" fixed to the door of St Giles. These included; the Earl of Bothwell, James Balfour, David Chalmers, Black John Spens, Seigneur Francis, Bastian Pagez, a soldier John or Charles Bordeaux, and Joseph, the brother of David Rizzio.

Suspicion was placed upon Queen Mary and the Earl of Bothwell. Although Bothwell was accused of being the lead conspirator in Lord Darnley's murder by Lord Lennox, he was found not guilty in April 1567 by the Privy council. After his acquittal, Bothwell made his supporters sign a pledge called the Ainslie Tavern Bond. Queen Mary married Bothwell on 15 May 1567, three months after Darnley's murder. In her letters, Queen Mary defended her choice of husband, stating that she felt that she and the country were in danger and that Lord Bothwell was proven both in battle and as a defender of Scotland: "...the true occasions which has moved us to take the Duke of Orkney [Bothwell] to husband..."

Bothwell's enemies, called the Confederate Lords, gained control of Edinburgh and captured the Queen at the battle of Carberry Hill. The Confederate Lords said that their disapproval of the marriage to Bothwell was the cause of their rebellion. Bothwell escaped and sailed to Shetland and then Norway. Four of his men who were already in prison were tortured on 26 June 1567, being "put in the irnis [irons] and turmentis, for furthering the tryall of the veritie." The Privy Council, led by the Earl of Morton, noted this application of torture was a special case, and the method was not to be used in other cases. Mary was imprisoned at Lochleven Castle and persuaded to abdicate.

Darnley's death remains one of the great unsolved historical mysteries, compounded by the controversial Casket letters which were alleged to incriminate Queen Mary in the plot to murder her husband, while Mary's half-brother, James Stewart, Earl of Moray, who became Regent of Scotland after Mary's abdication, is reputed to have signed a bond at Craigmillar Castle with other Lords in December 1566 pledging to dispose of Darnley.

== Trials and convictions ==
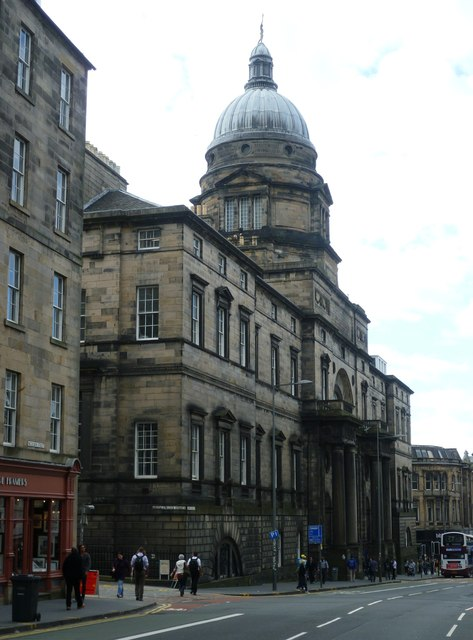
Old College, University of Edinburgh, replaced the medieval Kirk o' Field buildings, the Flodden Wall formed its south boundary. South Bridge street goes north over the College Gardens which had replaced the church quadrangle, in modern terms the house where the murder occurred was located at the junction between South College Street and South Bridge.

Records of the subsequent trials with statements from the accused and witnesses are an important source of information on the events of February 1567. Most were published in Pitcairn's Ancient Criminal Trials in Scotland and Malcolm Laing's History of Scotland. The accused were interrogated after Mary's abdication. Alternative theories of the murder have to disregard their evidence. Captain William Blackadder, an associate of Bothwell, was one of the first to be executed on 14 June 1567, although it was said he was only a bystander. Lord Herries wrote in 1656 that Blackadder rushed out of a tavern at the Tron on the Royal Mile at the sound of the explosion and was arrested. He swore he was innocent before an assize made of Lennox men, tenants of Darnley's father, and was hanged, drawn and quartered. In December 1567, John Hepburn of Boltoun (John of Bowtoun), John Hay heir apparent of Tallo, William Powrie and George Dalgleish, all servants of Bothwell, were put on trial. They were condemned to be hanged and quartered. The head of Dalgleish, who had delivered the casket letters to the Earl of Morton, was set on the Netherbow gate of Edinburgh.

William Powrie had made a statement in June, which describes how he and his companions, including James Ormiston, carried the powder to the King's Lodging. He included the detail that as they were carrying the empty chests back up Blackfriar's Wynd, they saw the Queen and her party, "going before thame with lit torches." Thomas Nelson, a servant in Darnley's bedchamber noted that it was first thought they would go to stay at Craigmillar Castle, then the Duke's Lodging at Kirk o' Field. When they arrived at the Provost's Lodging, Mary made her servant Servais de Condé provide hangings for the chamber and a new black velvet bed. Robert Balfour, the owner, gave Nelson the keys, except those of the door in the cellar which exited south through the town wall. After a couple of nights the Queen had the black bed replaced with an old purple one, because bath water might spoil the new bed, and she put a green bed for herself in a lower (laich) chamber. George Buchanan argued in the "Book of Articles" and his History of Scotland published in 1582, that this substitution for the new bed proved Mary's involvement in the murder.

The French valet, Nicolas Hubert, called Paris, said that Bothwell came to the lodging with Mary, and making the excuse that he needed the toilet, took Paris aside and asked him for the keys. Paris explained that it was not his role to hold the keys. Bothwell told him of his plans. Paris was troubled by the conversation, and went to pace up and down in St Giles Kirk. Fearful of the conspiracy he considered taking ship at Leith. In his second interrogation Paris named Captain Blackadder, who had already been executed. Paris was executed on 16 August 1567.

== Some conspiracy theories ==
An early rumour, noted by Darnley's family, was that Mary was present at the murder dressed in male costume, which she sometimes wore at masques at court and in the streets of Edinburgh. According to a document known as the "Lennox Narrative", Mary's temperament and strength would serve her to do what any man could do:

som saie she was present at the murder of the Kinge her faithfull husband in mans apparell; which apparell she loved oftentime to be in in dawnsinge secretlye with the Kinge her husbande, and goinge in maskes by nighte throughe the streates

One longstanding theory is the suggestion that the Earls of Morton and Moray were behind the murder, directing Bothwell's actions, to forward Moray's ambitions. These Earls made a denial of their involvement in their lifetime. The later and partisan Memoirs written by John Maxwell, Lord Herries in 1656, follow and develop this line of reasoning. Herries, after considering the arguments of previous writers, believed that Mary herself was innocent of involvement, and the two Earls arranged her marriage to Bothwell.

After the explosion, Sir William Drury reported to the English Secretary of State William Cecil, 1st Baron Burghley, that James Balfour had purchased gunpowder worth 60 pounds Scots shortly beforehand. Balfour could have stored the powder at the property next-door, also owned by the Balfours, and then mined the prince's lodgings by moving the powder from one cellar to the next. However, this James Balfour was the captain of Edinburgh Castle and was likely to buy powder for use at the Castle.

The home of James Hamilton, Duke of Châtellerault, lay in the same quadrangle, and Hamilton was an old enemy of Darnley's family, as they had competing claims in the line of succession to the Scottish throne. Hamilton was also related to the Douglas family, who were no friends of Darnley either. There is no shortage of suspects, and the full facts of the murder have never been deduced.

== Sketches sent to England ==
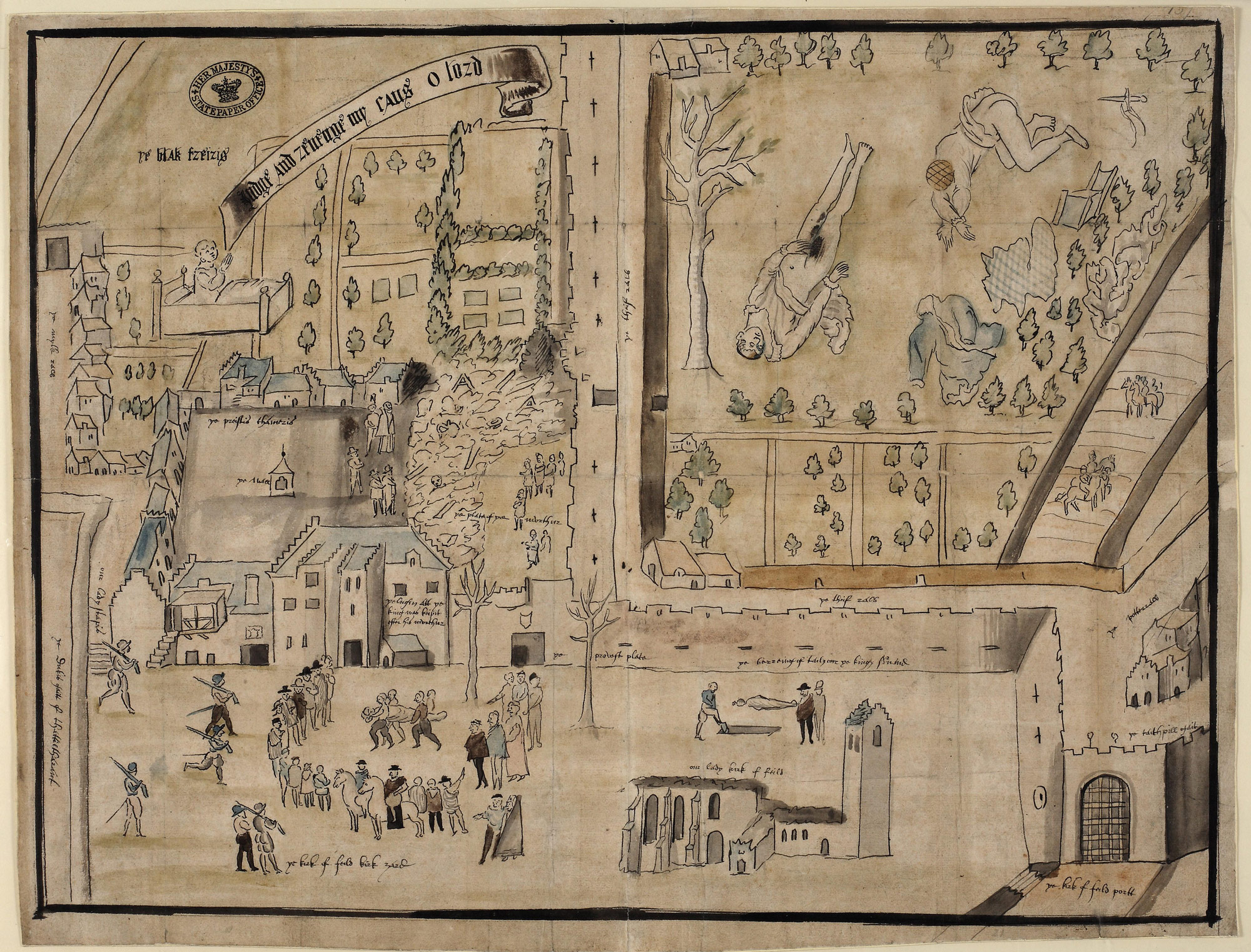
1567 drawing of the murder scene in Edinburgh, made for William Cecil, 1st Baron Burghley shortly after the murder.

A contemporary drawing of the murder scene at Kirk o' Field includes at the top left the infant James VI sitting up in his cot praying, "Judge and avenge my cause, O Lord". In the centre lie the rubble remains of the house; to the right Darnley and his servant lie dead in the orchard; below, the townspeople of Edinburgh gather round and four soldiers remove a body for burial. The artist was employed by Sir William Drury, Marshall of Berwick, who sent the sketch to England.

The sketch includes several cryptic elements. At first it appears to be an eye-witness account of the murder scene. However the infant James was not present, nor could he speak the words attributed to him at the time. Thus the image changes by its inclusion from an eye-witness account, to a propaganda poster, as an allegory. This same motto and a similar image of father and son was used on the banner of the rebel Confederate Lords, first displayed at Edinburgh castle, then at the battle of Carberry Hill. This banner was described by the French ambassador, Philibert du Croc, and a sketch of the banner was also sent to England. The drawing shows the town wall and the open door to the lodging (mentioned in Thomas Nelson's statement) in the background. A mystery in the Kirk o' Field plan may be the image of the mounted riders in the far right picture. Some riders at night were mentioned a week later as being a band of men led by Andrew Kerr who were present the night of the murder. It is unclear how the artist drawing the scene the following day knew to include the image of these night riders, if such they are, not known to be present until a week later.

Placards were created and distributed throughout Edinburgh which portrayed Mary as a seductive mermaid. James Murray of Pardewis was blamed for the placard. Two sketches of the mermaid and hare design were sent to England.
