= Philibert du Croc =

French diplomat

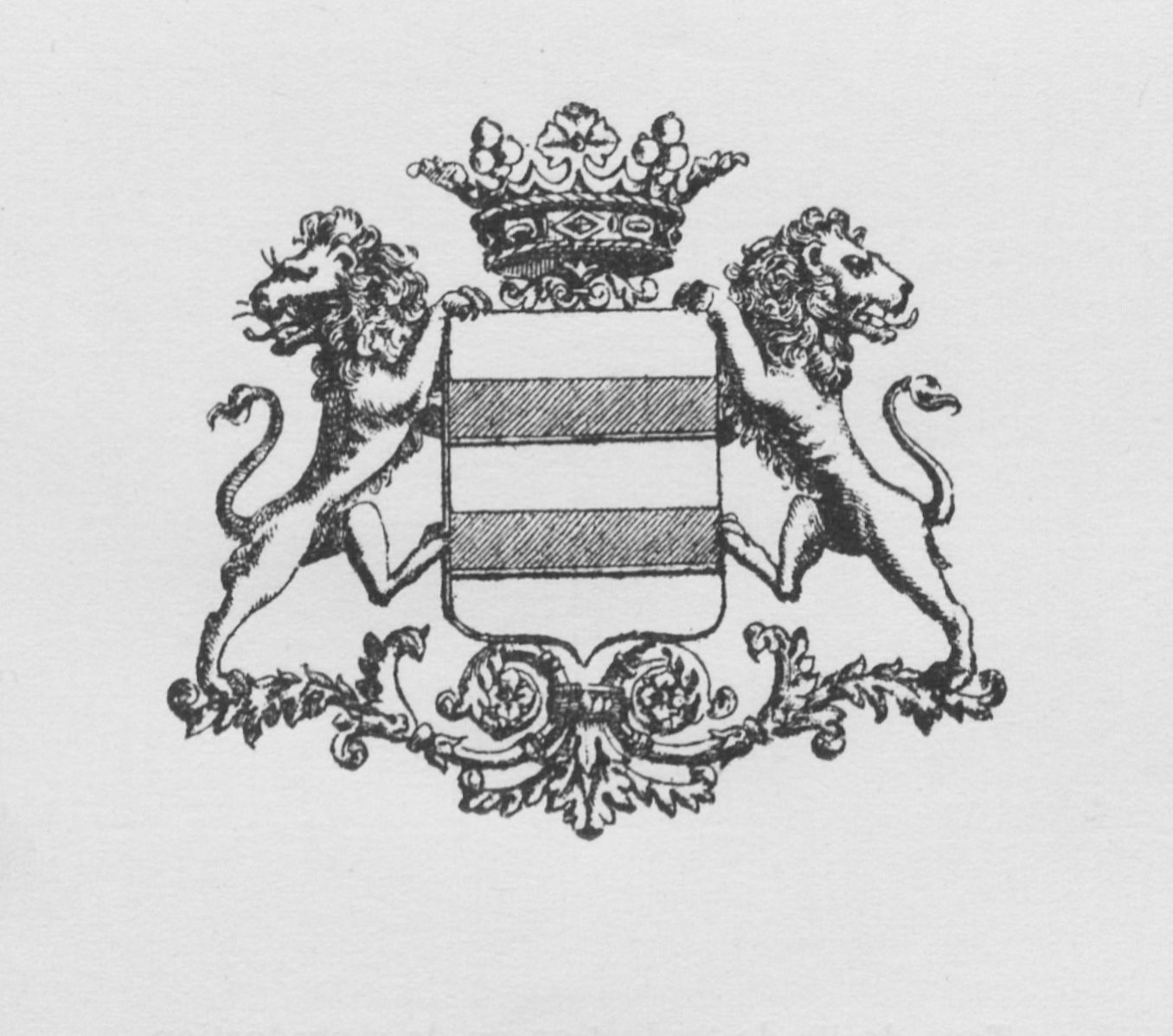
Arms of du Croc: D'or, à deux fasces de sinople. Couronne de marquis. Supports: deux lions.

Philibert du Croc (1515 - 1587) was a French diplomat from the Renaissance.

Born in an aristocratic family from the French province of Auvergne, Philibert du Croc was a courtier closely associated to the House of Guise and he was an ambassador to Scotland in 1566-1567 and in 1572.

== Early years ==
Philibert du Croc's name relates to the fief of "le Croc", located near the town of Thiers in the central France region of Auvergne. He was the eldest son of Gilbert du Croc, who distinguished himself in the French royal armies, notably during the Naples campaign in 1528, where he died. His mother was Philippe de Sailhans, from an illustrious and ancient house of Auvergne.

Philibert started military training as early as 1527 and entered the royal court around 1540–1542. He married Renée de Malvoisin in 1542.

== Courtier and diplomat ==
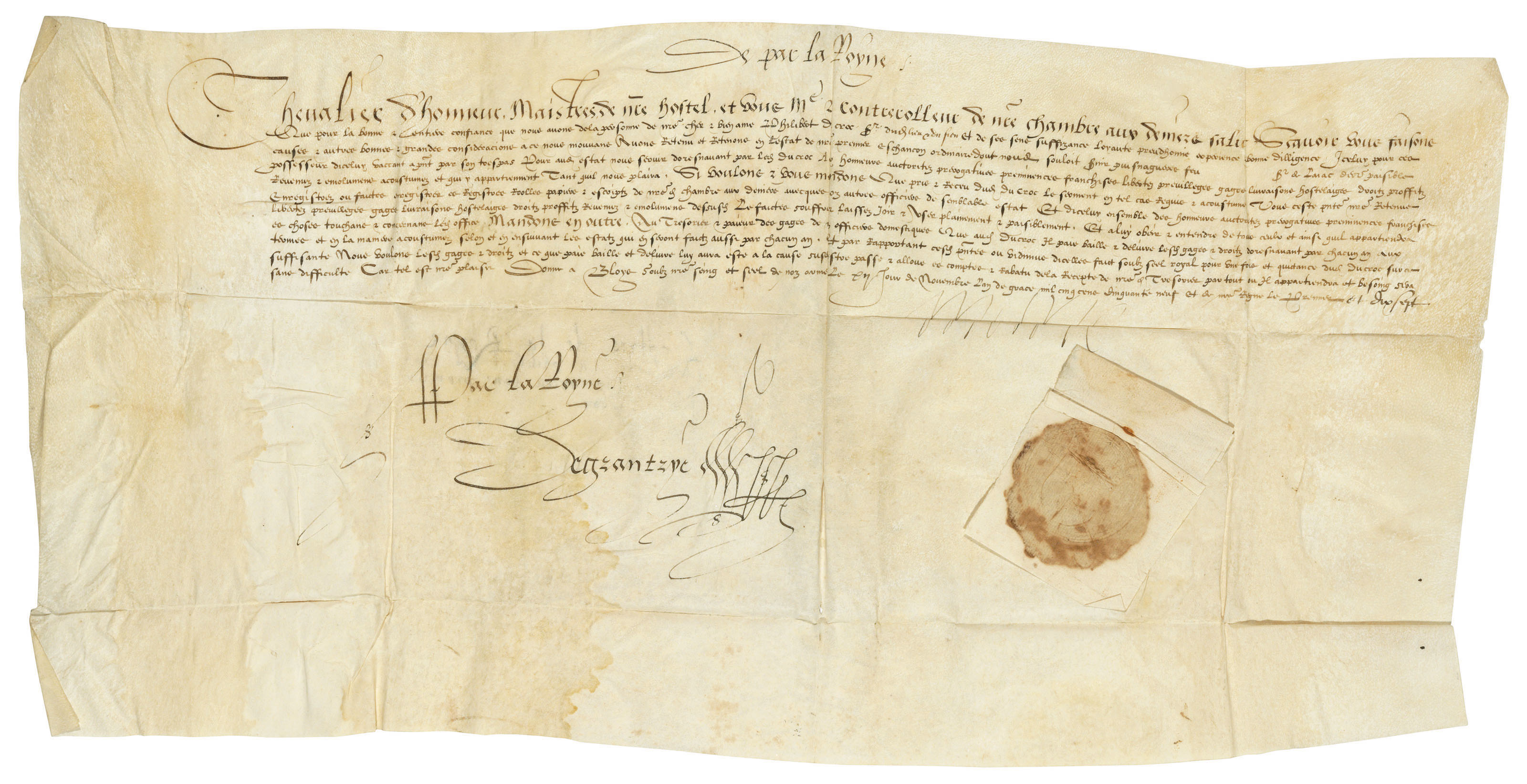
Document signed by Mary, Queen of Scots, narrating about the appointment of Philibert du Croc as Mary's first cupbearer ("premier Eschancon"). Written in French in Blois, dated 12 November 1559

On 25 July 1544, Philibert du Croc was appointed as échanson (cup-bearer) of the Dauphin, Duke of Brittany, who became Henry II, king of France in 1547. During this period, du Croc made multiple journeys as a king's envoy, notably to England, Piedmont, Scotland, Flanders, Calais and Boulogne. In 1558, he was invited by Francis, Duke of Guise to participate to the Cercamp conferences that would lead to the Peace of Cateau-Cambrésis. In 1559, after the death of King Henri II, who was succeeded by his son, Francis II, du Croc was sent to Edinburgh with letters from the king and Mary Stuart, his wife, to her mother, Mary of Guise, the queen regent of Scotland. These letters announced the arrival of the French troops sent to her rescue against the insurgent Protestants.

On 12 November 1559, Philibert was appointed as cup-bearer to the queen of France, Mary Stuart. He remained in her service until she returned to Scotland in August 1561, following the death of her husband Francis II, who was succeeded as king of France by his young brother Charles IX under the regency of his mother Catherine de Medici. Du Croc continued to serve in various diplomatic missions for the French crown.

He was sent to Scotland in February 1563 by Catherine de' Medici to announce to Mary Stuart the murder of her uncle Francis, Duke of Guise. He travelled to Scotland again in Scotland in May 1563, during the failed discussions with Mary Stuart about a potential marriage with Charles II, Archduke of Austria, son of Ferdinand I, Holy Roman Emperor.

== Ambassador in Scotland: 1565-1567 ==
In 1565, Du Croc was appointed maître d'hôtel (master of the household) and conseiller ordinaire (member of the "Regular Council") to the king of France, when he was sent as ambassador to Mary Stuart in Scotland. He reported to Paris on the grave events surrounding the murder of David Rizzio, Mary's private secretary, on 5 March 1566, with the complicity on the king-consort Lord Darnley. After the birth on 19 June 1566 of the future James VI, son of Mary Stuart and Lord Darnley, Du Croc worked without success for the reconciliation of the royal spouses.

He was at Jedburgh with Mary during her illness in October 1566. On 17 December, he took part in the baptism of the prince at Stirling Castle by carrying him from his bedroom to the chapel together with the Count of Brienne, who was the representative of King Charles IX, the child's godfather. Du Croc acted as the representative of Emmanuel Philibert, Duke of Savoy. He described the events of the day in a letter to the Archbishop of Glasgow. Lord Darnley was at the castle, but remained in his lodging. Du Croc refused to meet him because he was not in the queen's favour, and sent a message that if Darnley came to his rooms, he would exit by another door.

Philibert du Croc announced to the king of France the murder on 10 February 1567 of Lord Darnley, and reported the terrible events taking place the same year: the marriage of Mary Stuart to Lord Bothwell, the conflict between the queen and the Scottish Confederate Lords and finally the surrender of the queen and her imprisonment at Lochleven Castle. Until the end, Du Croc attempted to act as conciliator and also requested unsuccessfully the authorisation to visit the captive queen at Lochleven. He left Scotland at the beginning of July 1567, judging then his presence as useless.

== Royal assignments: 1567-1572 ==
Back in France, Philibert du Croc continued to serve the crown during this troubled time of wars of religion. The king ordered him to return to Auvergne in October 1568 to help keep this province faithful to the crown. Du Croc most certainly had countless missions as negotiator related to Protestant matters. Among them, he went at the beginning of 1570 to La Rochelle, centre of the Protestant party, in order to reassure its inhabitants after their submission. In August of the same year, he is tasked with negotiating for Charles IX a loan from Parisian notables. At the end of 1571, when Catherine de Medici gets closer for a few months to the Protestant party, he is sent to the dukes Henri of Guise, Claude of Aumale and the Marquis of Maine in order to convey to them that they should refrain from coming to Court in too large a number.

== Ambassador in Scotland: 1572 ==
Philibert du Croc was appointed as Knight of the Order of Saint Michael by the king in 1572. He was sent again as ambassador to Scotland the same year. The king of France instructed him to work on stopping the fighting and on the reconciliation between the two opposing parties in the Scottish civil war. His mission also included to visit Mary Stuart, who was held prisoner in England in Sheffield Castle, and to ask Elizabeth I for her release and departure to France. Du Croc left France at the end of February 1572 for Scotland via England. Accompanied by the French Ambassador to England, Bertrand de Salignac de la Mothe-Fénelon, he pleaded with Queen Elizabeth for the release of Mary Stuart. Elizabeth was not inclined to let du Croc see Mary Stuart, or to send her to France, especially since a coded letter was intercepted a short time before by Elizabeth's agents. In this letter addressed to the Duke of Alba, Mary Stuart asked for the support of the King of Spain. Du Croc had to wait in England until May 1572, after the signature of the treaty of alliance between France and England, for Queen Elizabeth to let him continue his journey towards Scotland for his peacemaking mission.

Du Croc was reluctant to use the title "Regent" when writing from Berwick-upon-Tweed for a passport to enter Scotland, because France did not formally recognise John Erskine, Earl of Mar as ruler of Scotland. Instead, the English March Warden, Henry Carey, 1st Baron Hunsdon wrote to Regent Mar on his behalf, an unusual procedure which caused delay. Du Croc found in Scotland a peculiar situation: the siege of Edinburgh, in which the city and the castle were held by lords supporting Mary Stuart, but they were surrounded by the lords in favour of the regency, supported by England. He was well received by both parties, but he could only obtain their agreement for a suspension of hostilities. A 2-month truce was signed by both Scottish parties on 30 July 1572, only after it was requested jointly by the queen of England and the king of France. It included gathering the Estates of the kingdom as soon as possible in order to conclude a general peace. Du Croc was ordered by the king of France to apply the truce agreement. The French Court was blinded by its dream of an alliance and wedding between the queen of England and the Duke of Anjou and did not realise or much care that the truce was ruining the cause of Mary Stuart by disarming her defenders, reducing the influence of France and placing Scotland's destiny in the hands of the English party.

Then, following the news of the grave events in France of the St. Bartholomew's Day massacre (24 August 1572), the queen of England decided to take advantage of the situation. She sent Henry Killigrew to Scotland on 7 September 1572 with the secret mission of promising great rewards to the regent's party, if they were to execute Mary Stuart. Killigrew was also instructed to profit from Scots' shock at the St. Bartholomew's Day crimes to stir up anti French feelings. Du Croc does not seem to have suspected the secret mission of Killigrew, that failed because of the refusal by Regent Mar.

Another manoeuvre was attempted during the same period by Elizabeth, which failed this time by the influence of du Croc. Queen Elizabeth offered 300,000 ducats to the Earl of Morton in order for him to deliver the king of Scotland, James VI, then aged 6, but du Croc managed to dissuade Morton.

Mary Stuart sent to du Croc an encrypted letter in which she asked him to support her cause towards the French court. After having transmitted this letter to the king of France, du Croc received from him the instruction dated 7 September to respect all the previous treaties with the Scots but also the one recently signed with the queen of England. The truce was extended by 2 months and the Lords' assembly was preparing in order to work on a peace deal. Du Croc believed that his mission was accomplished and left Scotland at the beginning of October 1572 to return to France. The truce between the 2 rival Scottish parties did not last. The Earl of Morton, who succeeded to the Earl of Mar as regent of Scotland on 28 October 1572 was Elizabeth's pawn. Mary Stuart's party could not defend themselves against the regent's party, which was militarily supported by England, and Edinburgh castle fell in April 1573 without receiving the aide promised by France.

== End of life ==
Philibert du Croc never returned to Scotland. He offered his good service to Mary Stuart in 1578 through the archbishop of Glasgow. But she had built a strong resentment towards the imprudent policy and conduct of France and she was raising a portion of her grievances against its former ambassador, du Croc. His offer was therefore turned down by Mary Stuart in these words: «Je trouve fort bon ce que vous avez dict a Du Croq pour son voyage; car je ne m’y veulx, en façon que ce soit, fyer; la preuve que j’en ay faicte m’ayant cousté trop cher par le passé» (I approve of what you said to Du Croq about his journey; as I don't want in any way to rely on him; the experience that I had, having cost me too much in the past).

Philibert du Croc withdrew to his land in Auvergne but he proved himself useful, such as in 1583, when he was tasked by the governor of Auvergne to pacify a conflict between several noblemen. In April 1585, during the troubles of the Catholic League, Henri III wrote to him to appeal to his loyalty and prevent any action detrimental to the crown on his land. On 20 June 1585, the Duke of Montpensier thanked him for the good service that the inhabitants of Thiers received from him and his son and asked him to continue Philibert du Croc signed his testament on 2 May 1587 and died shortly afterwards, the same year as Mary Stuart.

== Bibliography ==
- Robert Paulen (1996). "Philibert du Croc, 1515-1587: un seigneur d'Auvergne, un diplomate français de la Renaissance". Bulletin de la Société des études locales de Thiers (in French) (32). Thiers. ISSN 0765-2925.
- Robert Paulen (1997). "Philibert du Croc, 1515-1587: un seigneur d'Auvergne, un diplomate français de la Renaissance, deuxième partie". Bulletin de la Société des études locales de Thiers (in French) (33). Thiers. ISSN 0765-2925.
- Paul Destray (1924). Philibert Du Croc : un diplomate français du XVIe siècle (in French). Nevers.
- Louis Sandret (1869). Ambassades de Philibert du Croc en Ecosse 1565-1573. Revue nobiliaire, héraldique et biographique / publiée par M. Bonneserre de St-Denis (in French). Vol. V.
- Alexandre Labanoff (1844). Lettres, instructions et mémoires de Marie Stuart, reine d'Ecosse publiés sur les originaux et les manuscrits... et accompagnés d'un résumé chronologique (in French). Vol. V. Charles Dolman.
- Alexandre Labanoff (1844). Lettres, instructions et mémoires de Marie Stuart, reine d'Ecosse publiés sur les originaux et les manuscrits... et accompagnés d'un résumé chronologique (in French). Vol. VII. Charles Dolman.
- Bouillet, Jean-Baptiste (1847). Nobiliaire d'Auvergne, Tome II (in French). Imprimerie Pérol.
- Strickland, Agnes (1843). Letters of Mary, Queen of Scots. Vol. III. London.
- Keith, Robert (1844a). History of the affairs of church and state in Scotland, from the beginning of the Reformation to the year 1568. Vol. I. Edinburgh.
- Keith, Robert (1844b). History of the affairs of church and state in Scotland, from the beginning of the reformation to the year 1568. Vol. II. Edinburgh.
- Mattingly, Garrett (1955). Renaissance Diplomacy. Penguin Books.
