= Casket letters =

Supposed writings by Mary, Queen of Scots

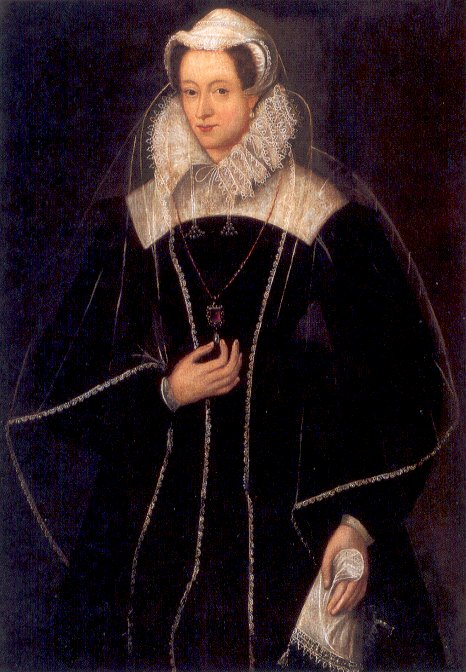
Mary in captivity, c. 1580

The Casket letters were eight letters and some sonnets said to have been written by Mary, Queen of Scots, to the Earl of Bothwell, between January and April 1567. They were produced as evidence against Queen Mary by the Scottish lords who opposed her rule. The texts were thought to imply that Queen Mary colluded with Bothwell in the murder of her husband, Lord Darnley. Mary's contemporary supporters, including Adam Blackwood, dismissed the letters as complete forgeries or letters written by the Queen's servant Mary Beaton. The authenticity of the letters, now known only by copies, continues to be debated. Some historians argue that they were concocted as forgeries to discredit Queen Mary.

== Political background ==
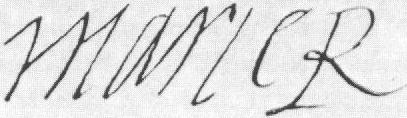
The genuine autograph signature of Mary Queen of Scots

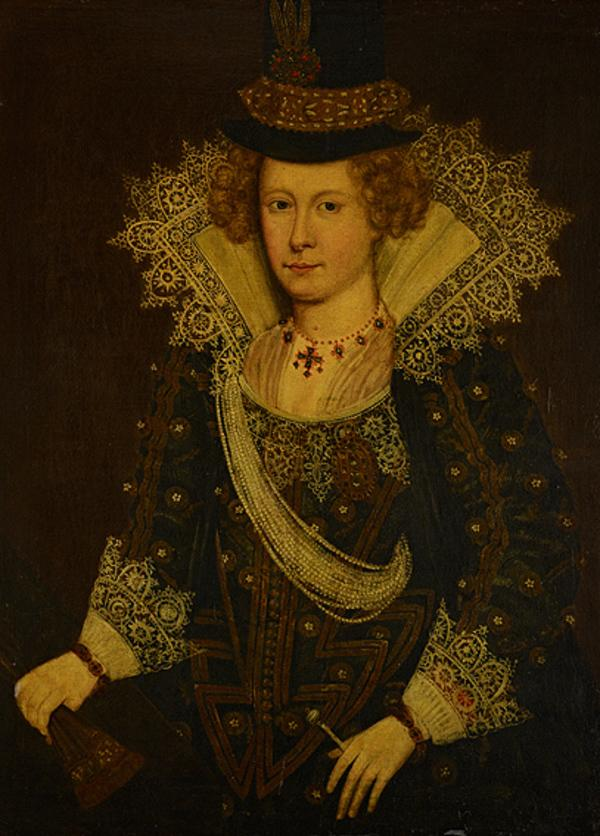
Some historians claim that the letters were written by the queen's lady, Mary Beaton

Mary's's husband, Lord Darnley, was killed in mysterious circumstances at the Kirk o'Field in Edinburgh on 10 February 1567, and she married the Earl of Bothwell on 15 May 1567. Bothwell was widely thought to be the main suspect for Darnley's murder. The Earl of Moray, Mary's half-brother, and the 'Confederate Lords' rebelled against Queen Mary and raised an army in Edinburgh.

Mary surrendered at the Battle of Carberry Hill on 15 June 1567 and was imprisoned at Lochleven Castle. On 24 July 1567 she abdicated. Her infant son was crowned as James VI of Scotland on 29 July 1567 and Moray was made Regent of Scotland.

At this time rumours spread that Mary had abdicated because of the discovery of letters which incriminated her. The letters were reportedly discovered on 20 June. At the end of July 1567, the Earl of Moray, who was in London, told Guzmán de Silva, Spanish ambassador to England, that he had heard of the finding of a letter in Mary's own handwriting to Bothwell which implicated her in the murder of Lord Darnley. He had not revealed this to Queen Elizabeth.

== Discovery of the casket ==
The casket of letters was said to have been in Edinburgh Castle, and given by the keeper John Balfour to Bothwell's messenger Thomas Hepburn of Auldamstocks. It was then obtained by Mary's political opponents. By the end of August 1567, Edmund Grindal, Bishop of London, had heard that letters in Mary's handwriting urging Bothwell to hurry up with the killing of Darnley had been found in a box of Bothwell's papers, and the Bishop sent this news to the Reformer Henry Bullinger in Geneva.

According to the document called "Hay's Book of Articles," compiled by Alexander Hay for the Confederate Lords in November 1568, which narrates events from Darnley's murder to Moray's Regency, the casket and letters were found and made known before Queen Mary agreed to abdicate, and public opinion after their discovery had brought her to that decision. The articles state that the Earl of Bothwell while planning his escape from Scotland, sent his servant, or "chalmerchild" George Dalgleish, to fetch the letters from Edinburgh Castle, so that the "ground of the cause should never come to light". However, after recovering the letters, Dalgleish was captured by Mary's enemies, among them James Douglas, 4th Earl of Morton.

In September 1568, the Earl of Morton officially handed the casket, "ane silver box owergilt with gold", and letters to Regent Moray. Morton declared he had not altered the contents of the casket and Moray promised to kept them intact and available to Morton and the Confederate Lords in order that they could explain their actions in future; "quhen-so-evir thai sal haif to do thair-with, for manifesting of the ground and equitie of their procedingis."

Morton gave testimony about the discovery of the casket in December 1568. He said that on 20 June 1567, Dalgleish had offered, under the threat of torture, to take his captors to a house in Potterrow, Edinburgh. Under a bed, they found a silver box engraved with an "F" (perhaps for Francis II of France), containing the Casket letters and a number of other documents, including the Mary-Bothwell marriage certificate.

Moray convened his Privy Council on 4 December 1567. They made and signed a statement in preparation for the Parliament to enact Mary's abdication, which stated the letters demonstrated Mary's involvement in the murder;

in so far as by diverse her previe letters writtin and subscrivit with hir awin hand and sent by hir to James erll Boithvile chief executor of the said horrible murthour, ... it is maist certain that sche wes previe, art and part (complicit) and of the actuale devise (plot) and deid of the foir-nemmit murther of her lawful husband the King our sovereign lord's father.

Mary escaped from Lochleven and made her way to England in May 1568. Her status was uncertain, as she had been accused of crimes and misrule. Elizabeth I of England ordered an inquiry into the question of whether Queen Mary should be tried for the murder of Darnley, as accused by the Scottish Lords who had deposed Queen Mary the year before. Moray came to England and showed the casket letters or copies of the letters to Queen Elizabeth's officers at conferences at York and Westminster.

== Conference at York, Westminster, and Hampton Court ==
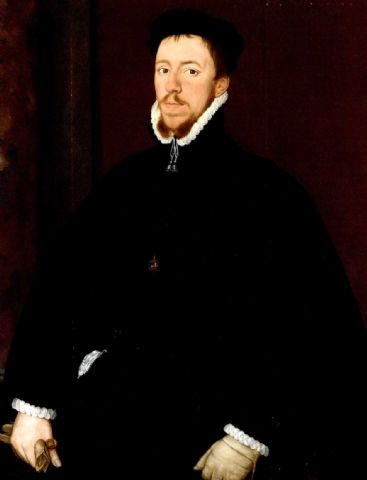
In 1571, the Duke of Norfolk was accused of trying to cover up the letters.

Nearly a year later, in October 1568, the Earl of Moray produced the Casket letters and the "Ainslie Tavern Bond" at a conference in York, headed by Thomas Howard, 4th Duke of Norfolk.

Moray produced the schedule of accusations known as the "Book of Articles" on 6 November 1568 at Westminster, and showed the casket letters again on 7 and 8 December. The letters were contained in "a small gilded coffer of not fully one foot long, being garnished in many places with the Roman letter F set under a royal crown".

On 8 December, Moray showed the commissioners seven papers written in French in the "Roman hand" or italic, including a "sonnet" beginning, "O Dieux ayez de moy". Moray claimed the papers showed his sister's love for Bothwell and her involvement in Darnley's murder. Copies and translations into English were made of these texts by clerks including John Somers. A marriage contract between Mary and Bothwell made at Seton Palace on 5 April 1567 was exhibited. This document may have been a contemporary forgery. The next day, the Earl of Morton submitted a signed declaration about the finding of the casket by the Earl of Morton.

On 10 December Moray, the Bishop of Orkney, the Commendator of Dunfermline and Patrick Lord Lindsay signed a document swearing the letters were in Mary's handwriting, and on 12 December at Hampton Court, Moray's secretary John Wood showed this statement to the Lord Keeper, the Duke of Norfolk, the Earl of Bedford, the Earl of Leicester, the Lord Admiral, William Cecil, Ralph Sadler, and Walter Mildmay.

The letters, sonnets, divorce and marriage contract were examined at Hampton Court on 14 December 1568, and the handwriting compared with Mary's letters to Queen Elizabeth. The evidence produced by the Scottish Earls, who were now sworn to secrecy by the English Privy council, was perhaps bewildering;

the whole writings lying altogether upoun the counsel table, the same were showed one after another by hap [chance], as the same did ly on the table, than with any choyse made, as by the natures thereof, if time had so served might have been.

For overriding political reasons, Queen Elizabeth neither wished to accuse Queen Mary of murder nor acquit her of the same, so the conference was intended as a political show. Queen Mary was refused the right to be present, though her accusers, including Moray, were permitted to be present. The outcome was that the Casket letters were accepted by the English commissioners as genuine after a study of the handwriting, and of the information contained therein. However, Queen Mary's commissioners were refused access to the letters to review or to study them. Yet, as Queen Elizabeth had wished, the inquiry reached the conclusion that nothing was proven. The outcome of the enquiry was to prolong doubts about Mary's character that Elizabeth used to prevent the Queens meeting.

While at York and Hampton Court, Regent Moray had a discussion which included the possibility of Mary divorcing Bothwell and marrying Thomas Howard, 4th Duke of Norfolk.

== Accusations of collusion at York ==
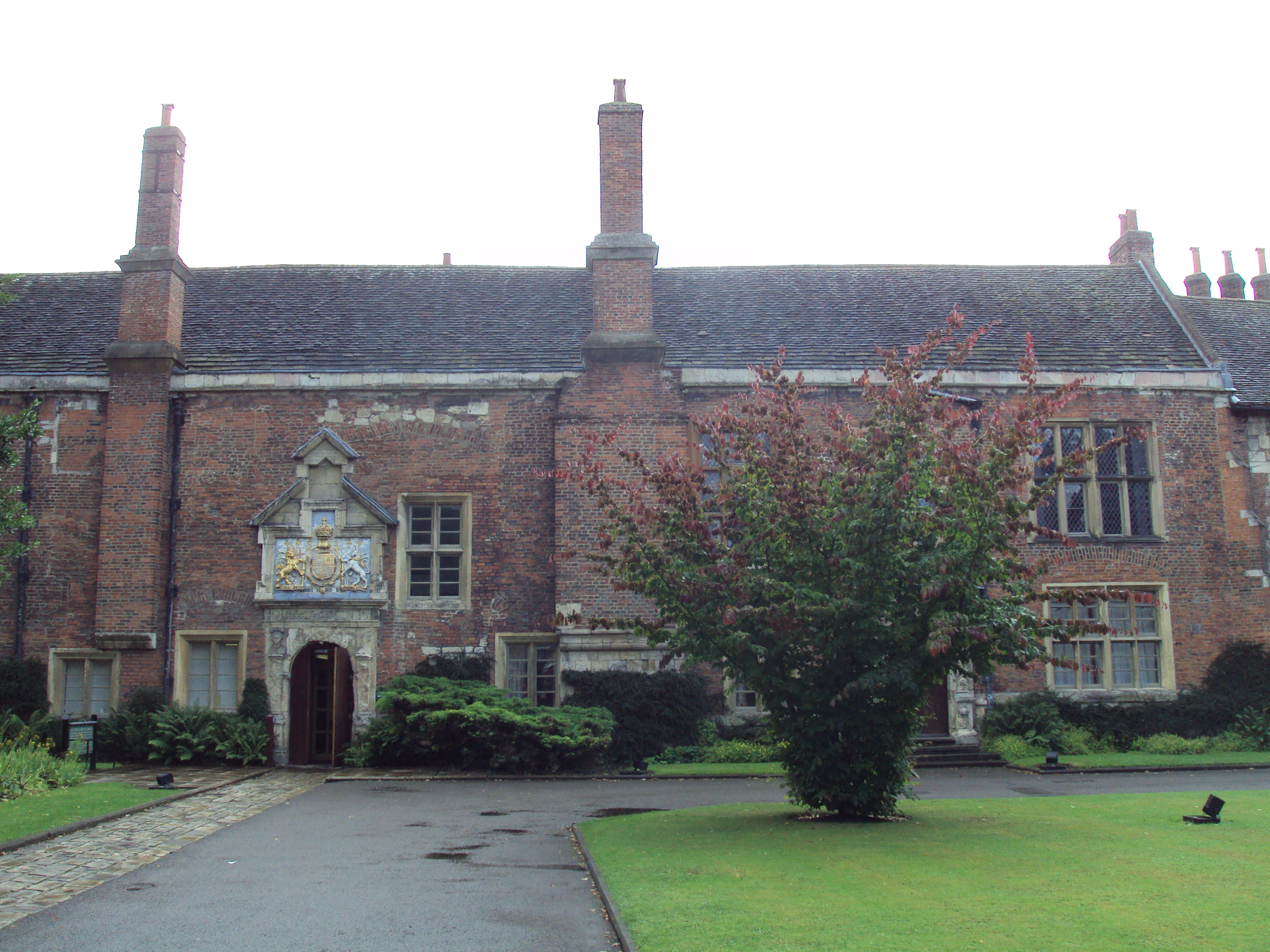
Regent Moray first showed the letters to Norfolk at the King's Manor, in York

The meeting at York was established as a conference to negotiate an Anglo-Scottish treaty. John Lesley, Mary's secretary, heard from one of her accusers, William Maitland of Lethington, that Elizabeth's purpose was "not to end her cause at this time, but to hold the same in suspense". Maitland had heard this from the presiding officer at York, the Duke of Norfolk, while they were out riding together to Cawood on 16 October 1568. The contemporary historian, George Buchanan, who was present at York amongst the Scottish commissioners, described Norfolk and Lethington's ride, and their agreement not to reach a decisive conclusion.

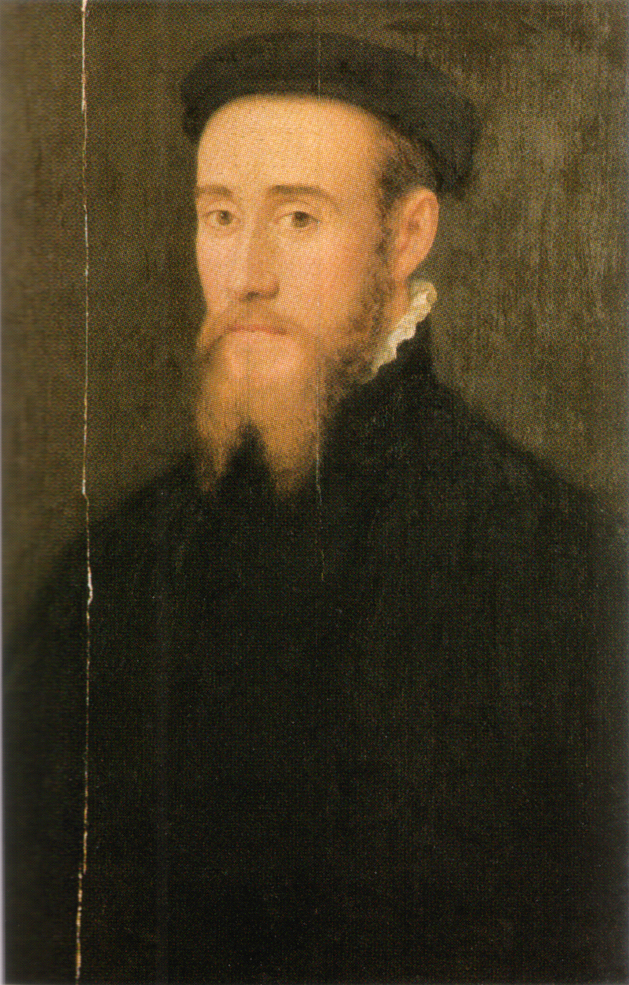
William Maitland of Lethington was said to have played a double role at York

This conversation came to light, having been found in Lesley's correspondence, and was cited in the charges of treason against Norfolk in January 1571. He was also charged with planning to marry the Scottish Queen, and asking Moray to suppress evidence against her at York.

In November 1571, Lesley testified that he had spoken with Norfolk in a gallery at York, after conferring with Lethington, and Norfolk was convinced that the publication of the letters would dishonour Mary forever. When Norfolk was questioned about the conversations at York, he said that Lethington had told him he was working for Mary. Lethington, said Norfolk, began to make him think Mary was innocent and planted the idea that he should marry her. Nevertheless, Norfolk was executed for treason in 1572.

Lesley, who was a prisoner in the Tower of London, said that Lethington had sent copies of the casket letters to Mary (who was at Bolton Castle), but Lethington's messenger, Robert Melville, denied it. Lesley also alleged there had been a plot to murder Moray on his return as he passed through North Allerton, but because Norfolk had persuaded Moray to be more favourable, the assassination was called off.

After the York-Westminster conference, on 22 January 1569, Queen Elizabeth wrote to the Earl and Countess of Mar, who were the keepers of James VI at Stirling Castle, to counter rumours that Moray had made speeches and secret treaties in England to ensure that he would become King of Scotland to the prejudice of the young King.

== Fate of the letters and casket ==
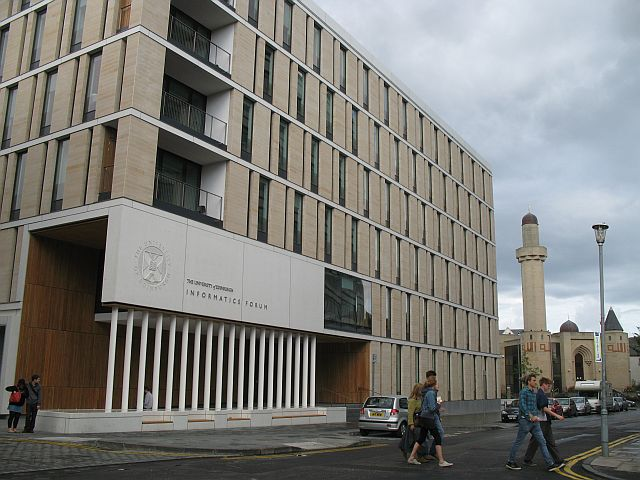
The Casket letters were said to have been discovered in a house in Potterrow, now the University of Edinburgh Informatics Forum

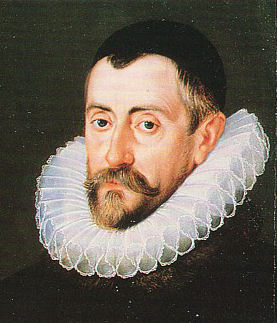
Francis Walsingham had an agent in Scotland looking for the letters

The letters seem to have been retained by the Douglas family after the sudden arrest and execution of Regent Morton in 1581. There were hints that George Douglas, brother of William Douglas of Lochleven, had merchandise of letters "worth the sight" in 1582, but this may refer to his attempts to negotiate for Queen Mary's return to Scotland at this time, called the "Association".

In November 1582, the English diplomat Robert Bowes heard from James Douglas, Prior of Pluscarden, that both the coffer and the "originals of the letters betwixt the Scottish Queen and the earl of Bothwell" had been delivered to the Earl of Gowrie, who was leading the government of Scotland at that time. Bowes had been trying to find the whereabouts of the originals for Francis Walsingham.

Bowes asked Gowrie if he would send them to Elizabeth, saying that he had made previous arrangements for this, and established that Gowrie got them from Sanders Jordan. Jordan was known as one of Regent Morton's confidential servants and had been forced to testify at Morton's trial. Gowrie explained that the letters were still relevant to those who deposed the Queen. Bowes argued that recent events and establishments were confirmed by acts of parliament and public instruments and the letters were not now significant. Gowrie would not give him the letters.

Bowes asked Gowrie again later in November, and wrote to Walsingham saying he had told Gowrie that Queen Mary was now claiming they were forgeries, and was hoping to obtain them herself to deface and destroy them (perhaps to further the "Association".) Bowes argued that Mary had the means to steal them from Scotland and they would be safer in England. Gowrie said he would have to tell the King about the request and Bowes preferred not. In their next interview, Gowrie told Bowes that James VI already knew where the letters were.

The originals of the letters were probably destroyed in 1584 by James VI. Only copies exist; one is in French, and the others are translations from the French into Scots and English. The nature of these documents – authentic, forged, or only partly forged – has been the subject of much discussion for more than four hundred years.

== Silver casket ==
An ornate silver casket, purportedly Queen Mary's, was acquired by Mary Gordon, wife to the 1st Marquis of Douglas. Following her death, it was sold to a goldsmith, but was later reacquired by her daughter-in law, Anne Hamilton, 3rd Duchess of Hamilton. The casket originally had the Queen's arms engraved upon it, but was replaced successively by the arms of the Marchioness, then the Duchess. The casket was formerly on display at Lennoxlove House in East Lothian (known previously as Lethington House), Maitland's family home. In 2022 the casket was bought, for £1.8m, by National Museums Scotland (with funding from a range of donors including the Scottish Government, the National Heritage Memorial Fund, and Art Fund) and will be displayed at the National Museum of Scotland in Edinburgh.

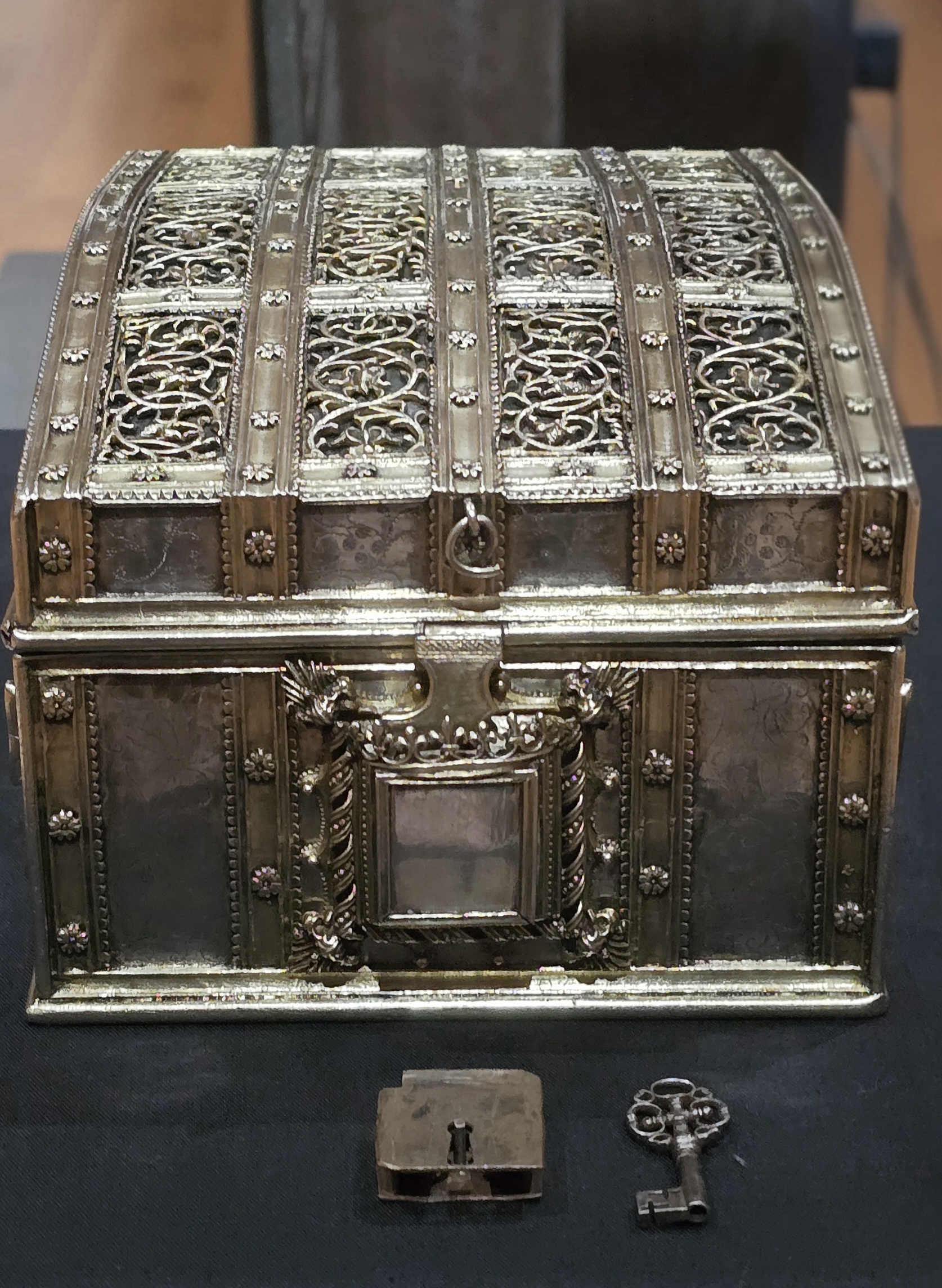
silver casket said to have contained the letters of Mary, Queen of Scots

Mary's inventories include boxes for letters and papers. A silver casket or coffret weighing one mark and two ounces and a black casket were bought for Mary in Paris in 1548. In June 1564, a casket or coffer (French: coffre) which Mary used to keep her papers in was upholsterered with embroidered black velvet and lined with black satin. The servant French Paris mentioned that, after the murder of Lord Darnley, a cassette containing money was taken to Bothwell's chamber, and later a coffre des bagues for Mary's jewels was delivered to the laird of Skirling at Edinburgh Castle.

== The copy letters ==
Four translated copies were preserved by the descendants of William Cecil. The copies do not reproduce signatures or dates, and they contain endorsements made by the copyist that indicate how the letters were to be used against Queen Mary. Versions of some of the letters and sonnets were printed in George Buchanan's polemic Detectio Mariæ Reginæ and Detectioun, and reprinted by James Anderson in 1727. Walter Goodall, in 1754, printed parallel English, French, and Latin versions without the clerk's endorsements. Goodall believed the letters were forgeries, partly because he thought the original letters had been written in the Scots language and Mary usually wrote in French.

The 18th-century historian William Robertson pointed out that the Scottish edition of Buchanan's Detectioun appears to preserve the original French opening lines of the letters introducing their translations, while the complete French texts seem to be merely translations from printed Latin or English copies. Robertson argued that if the letters were forged, they had to have been composed after the "Book of Articles", and not in earlier months as Goodall suggested.

Four other copy letters and other copy documents were preserved in the English state papers and the Cotton Collection. These were printed in the Calendar of State Papers, Scotland, Volume 2.

One of the letters invokes the imagery of the gift of a memento mori ring or locket in the context of Bothwell's absence and Mary's regret. as a token not of mourning, but of her love, steadfastness, and their marriage. A French version of the letter describes the object as a jewel containing his name and memory joined with a lock of her hair, comme mes chevaulx en la bague. The Scottish text of the letter includes:

I have send yow ... the ornament of the heid, quhilk is the chief gude of the uther memberis, ... the remnant cannot be bot subject to yow, and with consenting of the hart, ... I send unto yow a sepulture of hard stane, colourit with black, sawin [sown] with teiris and banes. The stane I compare with my hart, ... your name and memorie that ar thairin inclosit, as is my hart in this ring, never to cum forth quhill [till] deith grant unto yow to ane trophee of victorie of my banes, in signe that yow haif maid ane full conqueist of me, of myne hart, ... The ameling [enamel] that is about is blak, quhilk [which] signifyis the steidfastnes of hir that sendis the same. The teiris ar without number

The phrases and metaphors in this letter, and the equation of the precious stone and Mary's heart, can be compared with the verses associated with Mary's previous gift of a ring to Elizabeth I in 1562. John Guy concludes the original letter may have been from Mary to Darnley.

The French sonnets, said to have been found in the casket, were printed in Anderson's Collections, Volume 2, with Scottish translations. Walter Goodall reprinted the twelve poems in Examination, Volume 2. The sonnets can be evaluated as French literature and compared with Scottish devotional verse.
