= Richard Bannatyne =

Scottish clergyman and scribe

- Died: 1605
- Occupations: Clergyman and scribe; secretary to John Knox
- Notable work: Memorials of Transactions in Scotland from 1569 to 1573

Richard Bannatyne (died 1605) was a Scottish clergyman and scribe who served as secretary to John Knox. His place in history is substantiated in his role as the compiler of the historical record Memorials of Transactions in Scotland from 1569 to 1573.
