= Anne Murray, Countess of Kinghorne =

Scottish countess

Anne Murray, Countess of Kinghorne (1579 – 27 February 1618), was a Scottish courtier said to be the mistress of James VI of Scotland.

== Background ==
Anne Murray was a daughter of John Murray, 1st Earl of Tullibardine, Master of the King's Household and Catherine Drummond, daughter of David, 2nd Lord Drummond.

Her name was sometimes written "Agnes", in correspondence and in anonymous verses in her praise which include anagrams such as the acrostic sonnet "AMAGEMURNSAYAM", and a sonnet with the anagram "AGE MURNES AYE". The anagam may perhaps represent her own authorship.

Her sister Lilias Murray married John Grant of Freuchie in June 1591. James VI and John Wemyss of Logie attended the wedding at Tullibardine Castle, and performed in a masque. On the same day the Earl of Bothwell escaped from Edinburgh Castle.

=== Household of Anne of Denmark ===
A Dutch ambassador to Scotland in August 1594, Walraven III van Brederode, who attended the baptism of Prince Henry, mentioned that she or her sister was a lady in waiting to Anne of Denmark. One of her brothers was killed at battle of Glenlivet on 3 October 1594. Anne of Denmark paid for updates to her wardrobe in October 1594, giving her a new bodice and sleeves of blue satin, and silver "cordons" to embroider an existing gown. The materials were delivered to Søren Johnson, the Danish master of the queen's wardrobe. The record suggests that Anne Murray was then a member of the queen's household.

== Fair Mistress Anne Murray ==
Anne Murray was said to be the mistress of King James VI. This identification comes from the letters of Roger Aston and John Carey and two poems written by the king, or composed in a similar manner to his verse, given the titles (in some manuscripts) "A Dreame on his Mistris My Ladie Glammis" and "A Complaint on his Mistres absence from Court". Her husband's aristocratic title was "Lord Glamis".

The "Complaint" poem (first line: Whill as a statelie fleeting castell faire) compares her absence from court to a garland missing its flower, and a button or a jewel, a "chatton" missing its gemstone (lines 50-51);

The court as garland lacks the cheefest floure
The court a chatton toome that lacks her stone
(modernised)
The court is a garland missing her chiefest flower
The court is an empty button that lacks her gemstone.

Her absence, perhaps due to the forthcoming marriage, will transform the court to Hades, a kind of hell; "Since by thy absence heaven in hell is changed: And we as Divells in Plutoes court are ranged" (lines 41-2).

The "Dream" poem (first line: Whill as the silent shaddie night) includes the imagery of gifts of an empty gold locket (a "tablet") and an amethyst. In the dream, the amethyst with its traditional healing powers will encourage the king's unswerving devotion. The locket is the "chasteness", the chastity of the king's mistress, and her wandering thoughts are like the trails of decorative enamel on the case – in the Scots language "traling scores of amelinge blaks". On one leaf of the case there is a picture of a naked man sheltered from the sun in a green forest. This image represents the pleasure his mistress's singing voice brings the court. The other leaf shows the sun amidst the stars, as his mistress is the first among the ladies of the court. Inside the locket there is an image of cupid with his bow, but as yet, no picture of the king's mistress. By these two dream tokens the king imagines their love is knit together until cut by the fate "Atrope", Atropos.

A letter from John Carey, son of Henry Carey, governor of Berwick-upon-Tweed to Cecil, 10 May 1595, discussing her marriage calls her "fayre Mistris Ann Murray the Kinges Mistris". In the same month, Roger Aston also called her the king's mistress in a letter to James Hudson.

The letters show that Anne Murray was known as the king's mistress in London, and perhaps the poem "A Dreame on his Mistres" had circulated in manuscript at the English court. It has been suggested that James VI let it be known that Anne Murray was his mistress in 1595 when he argued with his wife, Anne of Denmark, about the custody of their son Prince Henry at Stirling Castle. It is possible that the idea of "Lady Glamis" as the king's mistress was only later attached to the poems by titles added in a manuscript. In such readings, the king's mistress of the Dream poem, first among the women of the court, can be understood as his wife, Anne of Denmark.

== Marriage ==
In May 1595, Anne Murray married Patrick Lyon, 9th Lord Glamis who would later become the Earl of Kinghorne, at Stirling. In early modern Scotland married women did not usually adopt their husband's surnames, and she would not have been known as "Anne Lyon". Lyon was the son of John Lyon, 8th Lord Glamis and Elizabeth Abernethy. His estates and affairs were managed by his uncle, Thomas Lyon, Master of Glamis.

James VI bought Anne Murray, his rumoured mistress, a trousseau of clothes, including a three-tailed gown of cloth of silver which she probably wore on her wedding day, and two other gowns. The gift was made to "Mistress Anna Morraye now Ladye Glamis for the tyme of hir mariage". This gift of clothes was among the most expensive of similar presents made by King James to brides including; Marie Young; Jean Stewart, Lady Lovat; Margaret Stewart, Lady Traquair, Jean Stewart, Lady Bargany; and Marie Stewart, Countess of Mar.

John Carey thought the wedding would be held at Linlithgow, writing "shortly the great marriage shall be solemnized at Lythquo between young Lord Glaymes and the King's mistress". Some sources following Carey's letter state the wedding took place in June at Linlithgow. The venue chosen however was Stirling Castle. Anne of Denmark set out from Linlithgow to Stirling on 30 May for the wedding banquet but fell ill after her horse was unruly.

The king and queen planned to come to the wedding banquet on 1 June, to be celebrated with "great triumph" at Stirling Castle, but Anne of Denmark was rumoured to have suffered a miscarriage. Roger Aston wrote that the banquet was to be held at the Countess of Mar's new house in Stirling, perhaps Mar's Wark, followed by celebrations at Gask, the house of the Laird of Tullibardine.

In the end, neither James VI or Anne of Denmark attended the wedding at Stirling because Anne was ill at Linlithgow. James VI invited the Earl of Mar to join him at merry making at Gask in July 1595 and this was probably the "in-fare" feast for the wedding.

Before the wedding, Anne Murray was said to be trying to make the marriage celebrations a peaceful occasion to bring together factions at court. The marriage was of political significance in Scotland, controversially arranged by the Earl of Mar, whose mother Annabell was a Tullibardine Murray, without the knowledge of Patrick's uncle, the Master of Glamis. The Master of Glamis wanted Patrick Lyon to marry a sister of the Laird of Cessford. Mar's involvement was part of his feud with the Chancellor of Scotland, John Maitland of Thirlestane.

John Colville wrote about the marriage of "Mestres Annas", as "A mariage laitlie contracted heir betwix the young Lord Glammes and Tillibarn his dochter will walkin (waken) again the greif betwix .a (Mar) and .h (Master of Glamis), for .h (Glamis) is marveluislie displesed tharwith". Colville felt that whatever the facts were, the Master of Glamis thought that Mar had practiced to his prejudice.

At Blair Castle a spade from Sri Lanka is said to have been a gift from Patrick Lyon to Anne Murray in 1594. According to her husband's 1615 will, her household servants included Margaret Colhoun an embroiderer, Helen Lyon a bed-maker or washing woman described as a lotrix, and two other female servants Agnes Livingston and Catherine Lyon. There was a musician named George Murray and two gentlewomen Helen Stewart and Jonet Murray.

== James VI and the Seven Pearls of Lochleven ==
In 1593 James VI was linked with a member of the Lyon family, Euphemia Douglas, daughter of Sir William Douglas of Lochleven, Earl of Morton and Agnes Leslie. She married the Master of Glamis in 1586. She and her sisters were sometimes called the "Seven Pearls of Lochleven". She may then have been known as "Lady Glamis".

Dr Tobias Matthew, Bishop of Durham wrote of the "king's affection to the Lady Morton's daughter", and that she might be connected with the Earl of Bothwell's schemes, and draw a person of "greater estate" into Elizabeth's devotion. In a second letter Matthew mentioned a mystery concerning the "king's love", Lady Morton's daughter and the contents of a letter intercepted by Bothwell concerning the succession to the English throne intended for a person of "great estate". Euphemia Douglas however, was not the king's mistress mentioned in Carey's letters, and it is also possible that Matthew's story concerned another of the seven Douglas of Lochleven sisters.

== Family ==
Six children of Anne Murray and Patrick Lyon, 1st Earl of Kinghorne are recorded:

- John Lyon, 2nd Earl of Kinghorne (13 August 1596 - 12 May 1646)
- James Lyon (d. August 1641)
- Patrick Lyon
- Frederick Lyon (d. 1660), baptised in Edinburgh, 23 January 1600
- Anne Lyon (d. 8 February 1637), who married William Hay, 10th Earl of Erroll.
- Jean Lyon (d. 2 February 1618)

Anne Murray died at Edinburgh on 27 February 1618.

== Sources and external links ==
- 'King James Did What?! With Who?!: Anne Murray, the mistress of James VI', Court Studies, Joe Ellis
- Maria Louise Reardon, "The Manuscript Miscellany in Early Stuart England: A Study of British Library Manuscript Additional 22601 and Related Texts", Queen Mary, University of London PhD thesis 2007, vol. 1 at pp. 183–4 and vol. 2 at pp. 34–35, 39–40
- Allan Westcott, New Poems by James I of England (New York, 1911).
- J. Bain, Calendar of Border Papers, vol. 1 (Edinburgh, 1894).
- J. Bain, Calendar of Border Papers, vol. 2 (Edinburgh, 1894).
