= Kincardine Castle =

Kincardine Castle may refer to:

- Kincardine Castle (Royal Deeside), a Victorian country house near Aboyne in Kincardineshire
- Old Kincardine Castle, Auchterarder, a ruined 13th-century keep in Perth and Kinross, dismantled in 1645
- Kincardine Castle, Auchterarder, a 19th-century manor housein Perth and Kinross
- Kincardine Castle, Mearns, a ruined site east of Fettercairn, Kincardineshire, where the now abandoned county town of Kincardine stood
