= William Murray of Tullibardine =

Scottish courtier and leader of the Clan Murray

William Murray of Tullibardine (died 1583) was a Scottish courtier and leader of the Clan Murray.

== Family background ==
William Murray was the son of William Murray of Tullibardine (d. 1562) and Katherine Campbell, daughter of Sir Duncan Campbell of Glenorchy (d. 1513) and Margaret Moncreiffe.

== Career ==
Mary, Queen of Scots, visited him at Tullibardine on 16 November 1562, and on 31 December 1566.

In March 1565, "young Murray of Tullibardine" was said to have carried a message from the Earl of Bothwell to Queen Mary. The Earl wanted to return from exile in France. When Lord Darnley was made Lord of Ardmanoch and Earl of Ross at Stirling Castle on 15 May 1565, he was one of 14 men who were made knights. Murray was given the office of foud of Shetland, a kind of bailiff in charge of collecting customs due the crown, on 29 July 1565. Murray was the official collector of feudal dues paid in agricultural produce including the "fat goods" of oil and butter and cloth known as "wadmell".

After the murder of Lord Darnley, Tullibardine's brother James Murray of Pardewis set up painted papers on Edinburgh's tolbooth slandering Mary, Queen of Scots. He offered to fight with the Earl of Bothwell in May 1567 to prove his guilt in the murder of Lord Darnley by combat.

On 9 August 1567 the English ambassador in Edinburgh Nicholas Throckmorton interviewed Murray, trying to work out the politics of his brother-in-law, the Earl of Mar, and the intentions of the Scottish lords towards the deposed and imprisoned Mary, Queen of Scots. Tullibardine discussed how she was expendable to the Hamilton family's cause.

Later that month, Murray and William Kirkcaldy of Grange took ships and chased the Earl of Bothwell to Shetland, but the earl escaped. Tullibardine continued the pursuit for a time. Some of the ships came from Dundee, including the James, the Primrose, and the Robert.

At the same time, his brother James Murray was made "customar" of Edinburgh, in place of James Curl, collecting taxes duties from merchants owed to the crown. Tullibardine was involved, requesting James Curl return some unlawfully impounded English cloth.

When Regent Morton made a progress in September 1575, Murray and the Earl of Montrose escorted him from Stirling Castle to Kincardine Castle and he had dinner at Tullibardine the day after. Murray's sister was the influential Annabell Murray, Countess of Mar (died February 1603), who was the keeper of the young James VI of Scotland at Stirling Castle. There was a story, promoted by the secretary of Mary, Queen of Scots, John Lesley, that the king found the "testament of Bothwell" in Tullibardine's papers in 1577 and was pleased to hear a story that showed his mother as innocent, for a change.

In March 1579, as Comptroller of the king's household Murray told the Privy Council that he had commissioned and made a proclamation authorising Jerome Bowie's "visiting, tasting, and uptaking of wines for his Majesty's house at reasonable prices". Several merchants failed to comply. The Provost of Edinburgh Archibald Stewart and others came to argue the merchants' case, but the Privy Council was not impressed and set prices for wines sold to Bowie.

On 24 April 1579 the Earl of Atholl died shortly after attending a banquet at Stirling Castle. His wife, Margaret Fleming (who had been married to Murray's brother-in-law, Thomas Erskine, Master of Erskine), was also unwell. A rumour started that they had been poisoned. Agnes Graham, the wife of William Murray of Tullibardine, wrote to Annabell Murray assuring her that the Countess of Atholl's complaints against her were "forged lies".

He was Comptroller of Scotland. He resigned the office in August 1580 due to ill-health and James VI gave it to his son John. The privy seal letter appointing his son as his substitute describes his faithful service and the present "inhabilitie of his persoun, being subject to infirmitie and seiknes, speciallie the gut" (gout). His wife, Agnes Graham, was also unwell, which meant that he wished to remain at home rather than attend at court.

He died in 1583.

== Family ==
William Murray married Agnes Graham, a daughter of William Graham, 2nd Earl of Montrose, and Janet Keith. Their children included:

- John Murray, 1st Earl of Tullibardine
- Captain George Murray, who was with James VI in Denmark.
- Alexander Murray of Drumdewan, made a gentleman of the king's forechamber in June 1580.
- William Murray, made a gentleman of the king's forechamber in June 1580.
- Jean Murray, who married James Henderson of Fordell.

A sister of Agnes Graham, Jonet Graham, married his cousin, Andrew Murray of Balvaird and Arngask. Their children included:

- Andrew Murray of Balvaird and Arngask (d. 1590).
- Patrick Murray of Geanies or Gleanis
- David Murray, 1st Viscount of Stormont (d.1631).

John Murray of Pardewis was a brother of William Murray, the Comptroller.
