= Kincardine =

Kincardine may refer to:

== Places ==
=== Scotland ===
- Kincardine, Fife, a town on the River Forth, Scotland
  - Kincardine Bridge, a bridge which spans the Firth of Forth
- Kincardineshire, a historic county
  - Kincardine, Aberdeenshire, now abandoned
  - Kincardine and Deeside, a former local government district
  - Kincardine and Mearns, a current local government district
- Kincardine, Sutherland
- Kincardine O'Neil, Deeside
- Abernethy and Kincardine, Highland
- Kincardine-in-Menteith, Stirling

=== Canada ===
- Kincardine, Ontario
  - Kincardine, Ontario (community)

== Other uses ==
- Earl of Kincardine, a title in the Peerage of Scotland
- Kincardine power station, in Fife, closed down in 1997

== See also ==
- Kincardine Castle (disambiguation), several castles in Scotland
