= William Murray (valet) =

Scottish courtier

William Murray was a Scottish courtier, a household servant of James VI of Scotland as a "valet of the king's chamber" and wardrobe, or a cubicular (bedchamber servant), in the period 1569 through 1591 and perhaps later. He served the king at Stirling Castle and in Edinburgh.

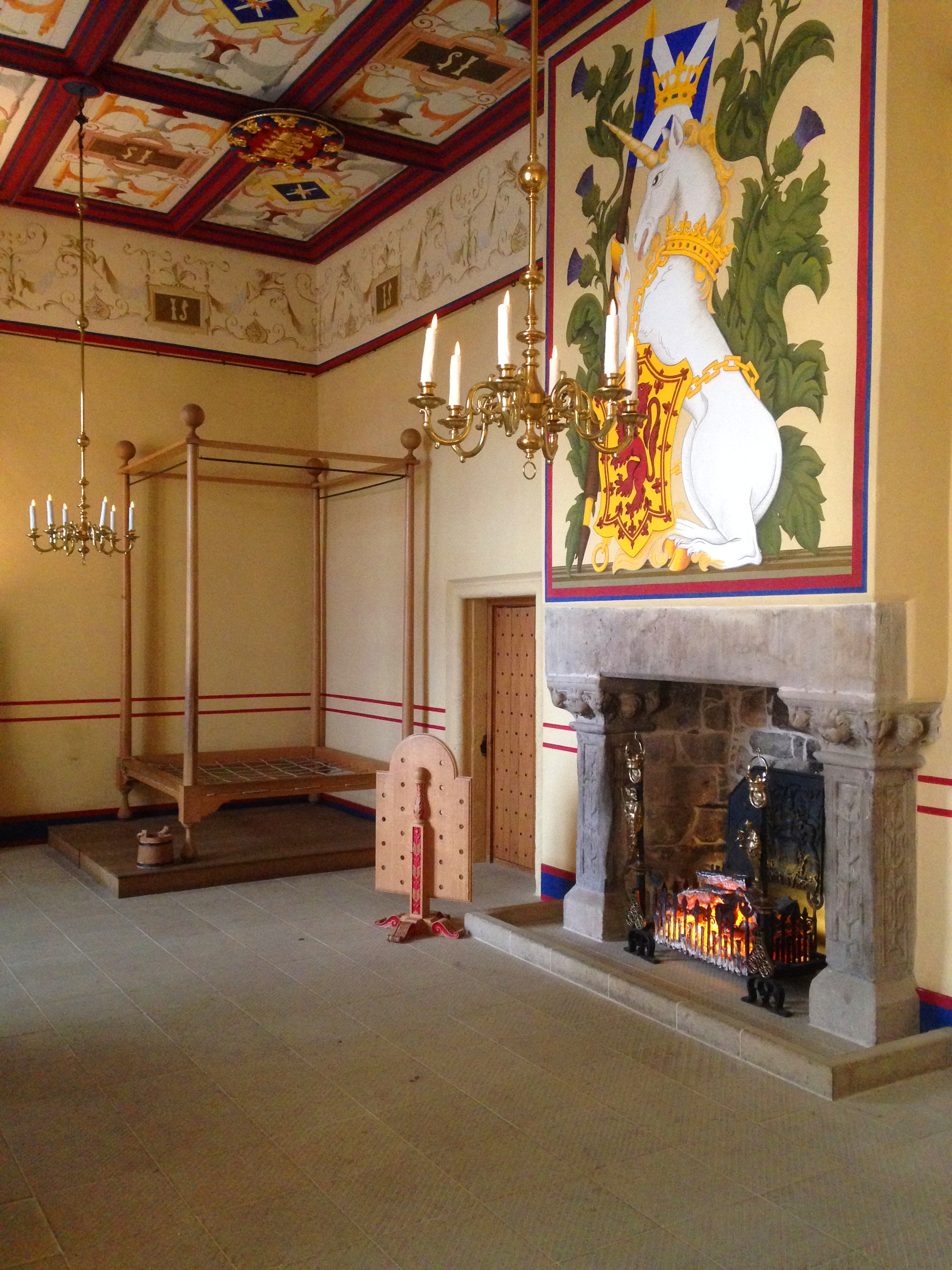
William Murray was a servant in the king's bedchamber at Stirling Castle, and decorated his study, a small room through the door by the fireplace

== Family background ==
According to the register of privy seal letters, he was a son of James or John Murray, who had been the barber of James VI's father, King James V of Scotland. Mary, Queen of Scots mentions William Murray as a barber who practiced surgery. He had served her husband Lord Darnley and was travelling to France in July 1571. A 1579 entry in the exchequer rolls says William was the son of John Murray, "chyrugi", a barber surgeon. William Murray had a brother, John Murray, who was married to Jonet Tennant. His son, John Murray, was later a valet to Prince Henry and to Prince Charles. William Brog was barber surgeon to James VI in the 1570s.

== Career ==
William Murray served the young James VI at Stirling Castle as a valet. The royal household was managed by Annabell Murray, Countess of Mar. Another servant, William Broig, was the king's barber. Murray was sometimes described as a "cubicular", a Latinate word for a bedchamber servant. A valet since 1569, in 1577 he was given a second appointment as a "varlet of the wardrobe". The valets typically slept in beds the King's chamber or bed chamber.

In 1571, William Murray brought tapestry from Stirling Castle to decorate Stirling Tolbooth for the Parliament. There are several records of purchases made for James VI by Murray. In July and August 1574 he organised the decoration of the king's study or cabinet in the palace at Stirling with green paint, copper tacks, and broad green woollen cloth. In 1576 he bought bird seed for the king's parrots, supervised the construction of a bird cage from wire for the king's chamber, bought cord to hang up bird cages, and bought tennis rackets. Murray brought clothes made by the king's tailors in Edinburgh to the king at Stirling.

For New Year's Day 1579, Murray bought 24 gold rings for James VI to distribute as gifts. Records of his purchases for the court show that he must have been one of the chief household servants at this time.

In 1591, the four valets were William Murray, William Stewart, John Gibb, and John Stewart of Rosland.

During the Earl of Bothwell's Raid of Holyrood in July 1593, James VI was surprised emerging from the privy with William Murray, and unable to reach safety in the Queen's chamber, had to confront the Earl.

Possibly the same William Murray (or a valet of the same name serving the Prince) appears in financial records connected with the household of Prince Henry at Stirling Castle, named in receipts in 1595 for silverware used by the Prince, including candlesticks and a trencher plate with salt cellar in 1595.

== Contemporaries of the same name at the Scottish court ==
Another William Murray in the royal household was Master of Carriage to James VI, in charge of transporting the king's luggage. His wife Christian Lindsay baked the king's shortbread and oatcakes and may have been a poet. In 1579, one of the keepers of drinking vessels was another William Murray.

Master William Murray, a son of William Murray of Tullibardine (died 1583) and a nephew of Annabell, Countess of Mar, was made a gentleman in the king's bedchamber or "forechamber" in June 1580.

A third (and younger) William Murray, a son of Catherine Murray, Lady Abercairny, a sister of the Countess of Mar, was a schoolroom companion of James VI at Stirling. He became a Master of the Horse to Anne of Denmark.
