= Charles Cauchon de Maupas =

French ambassador

Charles Cauchon de Maupas et du Thour or du Tour (1566–1629) was a French ambassador to the Scottish and English court of James VI and I.

He was the son of Jean-Baptiste Cauchon de Maupas and Marie de Morillon.

== Scotland in 1602 ==
English and Scottish sources usually name him the "Baron de Tour" or "Baron du Thour". He was sent as ambassador to James VI of Scotland from Henry IV of France. Henry IV wrote to his ambassador in London in April 1602, Christophe de Harlay, Count of Beaumont, mentioning he was sending a gift of horses and mules to Scotland with the "Baron du Tour", in return for the packs of hunting dogs which James VI had sent him. Henry IV hoped Beaumont could obtain a passport for De Tour and his wife to travel through England with their company and the animals. Beaumont replied that Elizabeth was likely to make this difficult.

De Tour and his wife Anne de Gondi landed at Scarborough and travelled to Edinburgh through England, and met up with the two ships carrying the horses and mules at Leith on 21 July 1602. This confused Lord Sanquhar who was supposed to meet him. De Tour was lodged in Leith for a time. Two weeks after his arrival, in August 1602 he met James VI in the garden of Falkland Palace and spoke with him for three quarters of an hour, often making him laugh. The Baron stayed in Falkland village for a few days while James went to Perth. When the king returned they went hunting together in Falkland park and he met the queen Anne of Denmark. After this, he returned to his lodging in Leith, and the English diplomat George Nicholson spoke to him using Lord Sanquhar as an interpreter.

At Stirling he was feasted by the Earl of Mar and had a discussion with his mother Annabell Murray, Countess of Mar at her house, Mar's Wark. He returned to Edinburgh, then went to Hamilton, hosted by Lord Hamilton, hunting with the king and the Duke of Lennox and playing a card game called "mawe". The ambassador's wife Anne de Gondi was entertained at Falkland by Anne of Denmark and the Master of Gray. James VI was also recording playing "mawe" (probably the card-game now called "Forty-fives") in April 1602 and with Lord Hamilton at Kinneil House at Christmas in 1588.

In November 1602 he interviewed an Italian fencing and language teacher who had accused Francis Mowbray of treason, and found him to be both "a witty man and a cunning corrupted person." He advised James VI that Mowbray should be tortured, rather than fight a duel with the Italian.

== Union of the Crowns ==
The Baron du Tour came with James VI to England in 1603 at the Union of the Crowns. His pregnant wife was carried from Edinburgh to London in a chair suspended in slings by eight porters taking turns in two teams of four. According to Maximilien de Béthune, Duke of Sully, King James sent him to Henri IV at Fontainebleau on 18 May 1603, a few days after they arrived in London.

King James asked Henry IV of France to make him Ambassador in Ordinary, resident in England, in preference to Christophe de Harlay, Count of Beaumont, who had made a thoughtless remark about Arbella Stuart being a suitable successor to Queen Elizabeth.

In 1603 the Papal nuncio in Paris reported that the Baron de Tour had told him Anne of Denmark was a Catholic but kept her faith hidden. In January 1606 the Baron de Tour was sent to London to congratulate King James on his escape from the peril of the Gunpowder Plot.

== England in 1617 ==
The Baron de Tour arrived in England as an extraordinary ambassador in February 1617. His ship had nearly been wrecked in a storm and the mast had to be cut and he had to recuperate at Dover for a few days. There were mixed reports of his reception, said to be lavish because he was an old acquaintance of the king's and also controversial because of his low status as a mere baron. After his initial audiences with the king, he spoke to Lionello, the Venetian secretary, praising Marie de' Medici and denigrating the Prince of Condé. He left in March with a present of silver gilt plate.

Marmaduke Darrell was advanced £1000 to host the ambassador. During his time in London, Ben Jonson wrote a masque, Lovers Made Men, to be presented by the Lord Hay to the Baron de Tour, at his house in London. The performance was staged by Lucy Russell, Countess of Bedford. John Chamberlain wrote that he was "solemnly invited to the Lord Hayes to a supper and a masque, where the Countess of Bedford is lady and mistress of the feast", and after his return to France, "gone after their great entertainment, which was too great for such petty companions, specially that of the Lord Hay's which stood him in more than £2200."

The Baron de Tour of this masque is sometimes confused with Henri de La Tour d'Auvergne, Duke of Bouillon (1555-1623).

After he left England Viscount Fenton wrote, "Baron de Toure hes takin his lieve. His besines was only so far as I can learn for this matter of the Princess, whom he would make appear to be in a very weak estate."

== At the French court ==
In August 1618 de Tour and a man called Chanteloup were asked to leave the court of Marie de' Medici or explain themselves to the Grand Council. They chose to retire to their houses.

== Family ==
Cauchon married Anne de Gondi in 1600, eldest daughter of Jérôme de Gondi, a courtier of Marie de' Medici. She was pregnant in London in May 1603. Their son Henri Cauchon de Maupas (1604-1680) was bishop of Évreux.
