= John Stewart, 4th Earl of Atholl =

Scottish nobleman and courtier (died 1579)

John Stewart, 4th Earl of Atholl (died 25 April 1579), called the Fair, was a Scottish nobleman and courtier. He was favoured by Mary, Queen of Scots, but later turned against her.

== Biography ==
Stewart was the son of John Stewart, 3rd Earl of Atholl and Grizel Rattray.

He supported the government of the queen dowager Mary of Guise. He wrote to her on 10 June 1554 describing a skirmish in which his cousin George Drummond of Ledcrieff was killed by the lairds of Ardblair, Drumlochie, and Gormok, his followers. Lord Ruthven, sheriff of Perth, and Lord Drummond had searched for these lairds in vain but arrested six innocent poor men, who also depended on him. He hoped she could arrange a fair trial for them in Edinburgh or Perth, especially because Lord Ruthven favoured the Drummonds. He was coming to see her, but had fallen ill and wrote from Tullibardine. Subsequently, Patrick Blair of Ardblair was found, tried, and beheaded for the murder.

In 1560 he was one of the three nobles who voted in Parliament against the Reformation and the confession of faith, and declared their adherence to Roman Catholicism. Subsequently, however, he joined the league against the Earl of Huntly, whom with Murray and Morton he defeated at Corrichie in October 1562, and he supported the projected marriage of Elizabeth I with Arran.

On the arrival of Mary, Queen of Scots, from France in 1561 he was appointed one of the twelve privy councillors, and on account of his religion obtained a greater share the queen's favour than either Murray or Maitland. He hosted Queen Mary at a hunt in his lands in August 1564 with "great entertainment of banqueting with all kinds of delicates that could be gotten". Mary stayed at a refurbished lodge or encampment called the "Lunkartis" in Glen Tilt.

Atholl was one of the principal supporters of the marriage with Lord Darnley, became the leader of the Roman Catholic nobles, and with John Knox obtained the chief power in the government, successfully protecting Mary and Darnley from Murray's attempts to regain his ascendancy by force of arms. According to Knox he openly attended mass in the queen's chapel, and was especially trusted by Mary in her project of reinstating Roman Catholicism. The fortress of Tantallon was placed in his keeping, and in 1565 he was made lieutenant of the north of Scotland. He was described the same year by the French ambassador as "très grand catholique hardi et vaillant et remuant, comme l'on dict, mais de nul".

After the murder of David Rizzio in 1567, he joined the Protestant lords against Mary, appeared as one of the leaders against her at Carberry Hill, and afterwards approved of her imprisonment at Lochleven Castle. In July he was present at the coronation of James VI, and was included in the council of regency to Mary's abdication. He, however, was not present at the battle of Langside in May 1568, and in July became once more a supporter of Mary, voting for her divorce from Bothwell (1569). In March 1570 he formed with other lords the joint letter to Elizabeth asking for the queen's intercession and supporting Mary's claims, and was present at the convention held at Linlithgow in April in opposition to the assembly of the king's party at Edinburgh.

In 1574 he was proceeded against as a Roman Catholic and threatened with excommunication, subsequently holding a conference with the ministers and being allowed till midsummer to overcome his scruples. In October 1578 he stayed with Morton at Dalkeith Palace and was said to have converted to the Protestant faith.

He had failed in 1572 to prevent Morton's appointment to the regency, but in 1578 he succeeded with the Earl of Argyll in driving him from office. On 24 March, James VI took the government into his own hands and dissolved the regency, and Atholl and Argyll, to the exclusion of Morton, were made members of the council, while on the 29th Atholl was appointed lord chancellor. Subsequently, on 24 May, Morton succeeded in getting into Stirling Castle and in attaining his guardianship of James. Atholl and Argyll, who were now corresponding with Spain in hopes of assistance from that quarter, then advanced to Stirling with a large force, when a compromise was arranged, the three earls being all included in the government.

== Death ==
While on his way from a banquet held on 20 April 1579 at Stirling Castle on the occasion of the reconciliation, Atholl was seized with sudden illness, and despite the attentions of the court physicians Gilbert Moncreiff and Alexander Preston, and a Highland practitioner recorded as the "Irland Leeche", he died on 24 April at Kincardine.

He was buried at the High Kirk of Edinburgh near the tomb of Regent Moray at the request of the King. James Lawson gave a sermon and read the Earl's will. The funeral procession included Highlandmen armed with bows and two-handled swords.

There was a strong suspicion of poisoning and his relatives, including William Stewart of Grandtully, complained to James VI. Some suspected Regent Morton or Annabell Murray, Countess of Mar. Rumours that he was poisoned with the Earl of Montrose, who survived, spread in England. The Spanish ambassador in London Bernardino de Mendoza heard there had been an autopsy conducted by five doctors. They disagreed over the findings, and one of the doctors who asserted there was no poison tasted the contents of the earl's stomach.

Regent Morton's friend George Auchinleck of Balmanno was tortured with the boot on 15 March 1580 and was said to have confessed that Morton had Atholl poisoned. Affleck blamed another captive associate of Morton, Sanders Jordan, (Alexander Jardine).George Auchinleck was said to have confessed that Morton had the Earl of Atholl poisoned, blaming another prisoner, Sanders Jordan or Jardine. It was thought that John Provand had provided the poison.

== Family ==
John married

- (1) Elizabeth Gordon, daughter of George Gordon, 4th Earl of Huntly and Elizabeth Keith, by whom he had
  - Elizabeth Stewart, Countess of Arran, who married Hugh Fraser, 5th Lord Lovat, and secondly Robert Stewart, Earl of March, and thirdly James Stewart, Earl of Arran.
- (2) Margaret Fleming (1529–1586), daughter of Malcolm Fleming, 3rd Lord Fleming and Janet Stewart, widow of Robert Graham, Baron Graham, and of Thomas Erskine, Master of Erskine (brother of John Erskine, 5th Lord Erskine. With Margaret, James had three daughters and one son:
  - Jean Stewart, who married Duncan Campbell of Glenorchy on 11 July 1574, was the mother of Colin Campbell of Glenorchy and Robert Campbell of Glenorchy, grandfather of Sir Ewen Cameron of Lochiel.
  - Grizel Stewart, wife of David Lindsay, 11th Earl of Crawford
  - Mary Stewart, wife of Francis Hay, 9th Earl of Erroll
  - John Stewart, 5th Earl of Atholl, who married Marie Ruthven, at his death in 1595 the earldom in default of male heirs reverted to the crown.

Peerage of Scotland
Preceded by John Stewart	Earl of Atholl; 1542–1579	Succeeded by John Stewart
Political offices
Preceded by 8th Lord Glamis	Lord Chancellor of Scotland; 1578–1579	Succeeded by 6th Earl of Argyll
