= William Graham, 2nd Earl of Montrose =

Scottish nobleman and statesman

- Coat of arms
- Tenure: 1513–1571
- Predecessor: William Graham, 1st Earl of Montrose
- Successor: John Graham, 3rd Earl of Montrose
- Born: 1492
- Died: 24 May 1571 (aged 78–79)
- Spouse: Janet Keith (m. 1515; died 1547)
- Issue: Robert Graham, Master of Graham; Hon. Alexander Graham; Hon. William Graham; Hon. Mungo Graham; Lady Margaret Graham; Lady Elizabeth Graham; Lady Agnes Graham; Lady Janet Graham; Lady Christian Graham
- Father: William Graham, 1st Earl of Montrose
- Mother: Anabella Drummond

William Graham, 2nd Earl of Montrose (1492 – 24 May 1571) was a Scottish nobleman and statesman, who successfully steered a moderate course through the treacherous waters of mid-16th century Scottish politics.

== Origins ==
Graham was the eldest son and heir of William Graham, 1st Earl of Montrose by Annabel, a daughter of John Drummond, 1st Lord Drummond. The Grahams were a long-established family of Norman origin, who first rose to prominence in the reign of David I.

== Career in the reign of James V ==
Montrose succeeded to the earldom as a minor, following the death of his father at the Battle of Flodden. In 1525, he was one of a number of lords selected to attend personally on the King and in June 1535 he was appointed an ambassador to France in connection with the King's marriage. On 29 August 1536, he was named as one of the Commission of Regency during the King's absence in France until the King returned in 1537 with Madeleine of Valois.

Montrose supported the King in his struggles with the pro-English faction led by Archibald Douglas, 6th Earl of Angus and was rewarded on 29 May 1542 with a grant in feu of the King's lands of Rathernes and Blacksaugh, in Strathearn. (He afterwards also acquired the neighbouring lands of Orchill and Garvock.)

== Career in the reign of Queen Mary ==
Following the King's death, Montrose was present at the Parliament held at Edinburgh on 15 March 1543 and voted for the election of the Earl of Arran as regent for the infant Mary, Queen of Scots. However, when differences arose between the Regent and Cardinal Beaton, Montrose supported the latter.

Montrose remained a leading member of the Regent's Council and was rewarded on 11 January 1546, for his personal attendance on the Queen, with a charter of many of the lands forfeited by the Earl of Lennox (at least until Lennox's restoration to favour in 1564). In November 1547, Montrose took part with the Regent in the unsuccessful siege of Broughty Castle, following its surrender to the English after the Battle of Pinkie Cleugh.

Montrose was not present at the Reformation Parliament of 1560 and was the only nobleman to attend the Queen's first mass on her return from France in 1561. In 1563, the Bishop of Dunblane identified Montrose to Pope Pius IV as remaining true to the Catholic faith.

Although Montrose was made a member of the Privy Council on 6 September 1561, he is not recorded as having attended any of the Queen's Parliaments after her return from France. He favoured the Queen's marriage to Henry Stuart, Lord Darnley, but steered a middle course during the tumultuous upheavals that followed. Thus, he dissented from the deposition of the Queen and her imprisonment at Lochleven Castle between 1567 and 1568, and joined the Queen at Hamilton, following her escape; but he did not take the field in her support and his grandson and heir was on the other side.

Montrose died at Kincardine on 24 May 1571.

== Family ==
In December 1515 Montrose married Janet Keith, daughter of William, 3rd Earl Marischal. She died between 27 August 1546 and 25 August 1547. They had numerous children:

- Robert Graham, Master of Graham, who was killed at the Battle of Pinkie Cleugh on 10 September 1547. By his wife, Margaret Fleming, daughter of Malcolm Fleming, 3rd Lord Fleming, he had a posthumous son, John Graham, 3rd Earl of Montrose, who succeeded to the earldom on Montrose's death.
- Alexander Graham of Wallaceston, who married Marion, the daughter of George Seton, 3rd Lord Seton and widow of Hugh Montgomerie, Earl of Eglinton.
- William Graham, the Rector of Killearn, who died in about 1597
- Mungo Graham of Rathernis, who married (contract 26 March 1571) Marjorie, daughter of Sir William Edmonstone of Duntreath, was Master of the Household to James VI for many years and died before 15 May 1590
- Margaret Graham, who married (contract 17 February 1535) Robert, Master of Erskine
- Elizabeth Graham, who married George Sinclair, 4th Earl of Caithness
- Agnes Graham, who married (contract 15 April 1547) Sir William Murray of Tullibardine
- Janet Graham, who married Sir Andrew Murray of Balvaird, their children included David Murray, 1st Viscount of Stormont and Patrick Murray
- Christian Graham, who married Robert Graham of Knockdolian

Peerage of Scotland
Preceded by William Graham	Earl of Montrose; 1513–1571	Succeeded by John Graham
