= John Murray, 1st Earl of Tullibardine =

Scottish nobleman

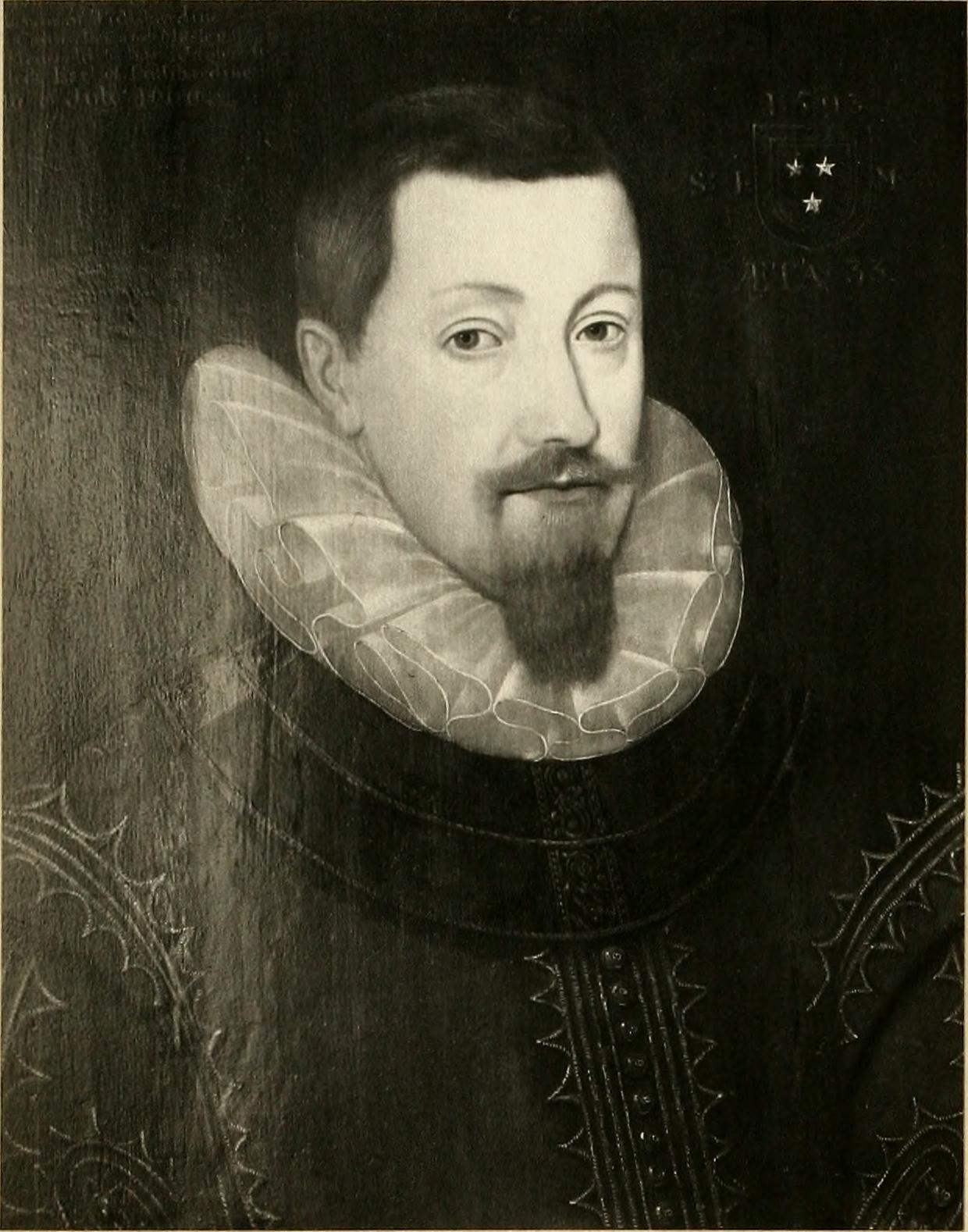
John Murray, 1st Earl of Tullibardine

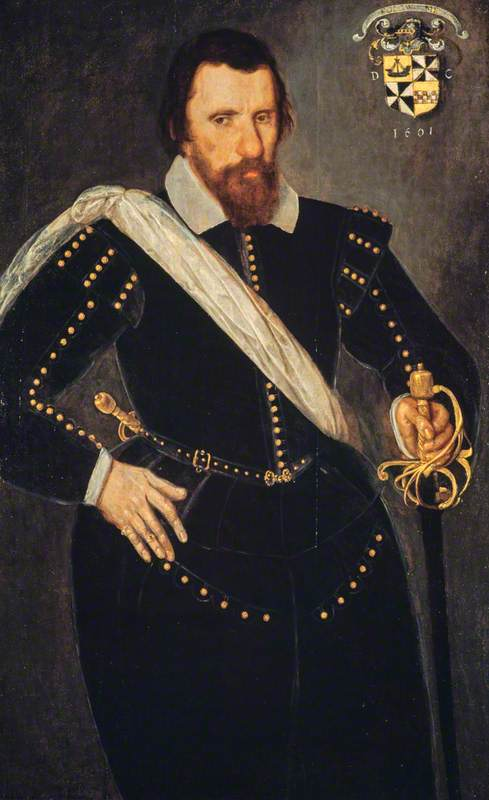
Murray was a guest of Duncan Campbell of Glenorchy at Balloch

John Murray, 1st Earl of Tullibardine (c. 1550 – 5 July 1613) was a Scottish courtier and leader of the Clan Murray.

== Career ==
He was born c. 1550, the son of Sir William Murray of Tullibardine and Agnes Graham, a daughter of William Graham, 2nd Earl of Montrose and Janet Keith. His paternal aunt was the influential Annabell Murray, Countess of Mar.

In August 1580, his father resigned the office of Comptroller of Scotland and James VI gave it to him.

Murray was a Master of the Household to James VI of Scotland. His uncle Mungo Graham of Rathernis was another courtier who shared this role.

His brother, Captain George Murray, accompanied James VI in Denmark in 1590.

In September 1590, Tullibardine and his brother-in-law Robert Murray of Abercairnie were guests of the Laird of Glenorchy at Balloch, now Taymouth Castle.

James VI often visited him at Tullibardine or Gask. James VI attended the wedding Murray's daughter Lilias Murray and John Grant of Freuchie on 21 June 1591. James VI performed in a masque with his valet, probably John Wemyss of Logie. They wore Venetian carnival masks and helmets with red and pink taffeta costumes. James VI was at Tullibardine again for New Year in 1592.

On 20 July 1593, he hit William Edmondstone of Duntreath in the face with the hilt of his sword during a session of the Parliament in the Tolbooth of Edinburgh, in the king's presence.

The Dutch ambassadors Walraven III van Brederode and Jacob Valcke mentioned Murray as steward or master of household to the king at Stirling Castle during the baptism of Prince Henry in August 1594. Murray fought at the Battle of Glenlivet against George Gordon, 1st Marquess of Huntly, and Francis Hay, 9th Earl of Erroll.

The king invited the Earl of Mar to join them "making merry" at Gask on 28 July 1595. This was probably the "in-fare" feast for the wedding of Anne Murray. James VI stayed at Tullibardine for the first week in January 1598. In April 1598, the Duke of Holstein, brother of Anne of Denmark visited Tullibardine on a progress with the Duke of Lennox.

Alexander Menzies of Weem complained in January 1599 that Murray had welcomed Donald Menzies and John Dow MacWilliam alias MacGregor, two thieves, as his household men and servants. MacWilliam had broken into the Place of Weem, now called Castle Menzies, and rescued Donald Menzies from a cell.

He consolidated his position as head of the family with two "bands of association" in 1586 and 1599 in which he was recognized as chief by numerous Murray lairds including the Morays of Abercairny in Perthshire.

In April 1604, he was made Lord Murray of Tullibardine, on 10 July 1606 he became Earl of Tullibardine.

== Family ==
Murray married Catherine Drummond, daughter of David, 2nd Lord Drummond (a great grandson of Colin Campbell, 1st Earl of Argyll) and Lilias Ruthven. Their children included;

- William Murray, 2nd Earl of Tullibardine, married (1) in 1599 Cecilia Wemyss, (2) in 1604 Dorothea Stewart.
- Mungo Murray, later Viscount Stormont.
- Patrick Murray, 1st Earl of Tullibardine (new creation), a gentleman of the privy chamber, who married (1) in 1603, Prudence Bulmer, a daughter of Bevis Bulmer, and widow of John Beeston a nephew of Hugh Beeston, and (2) in 1613, Elizabeth Denton or Dent, the widow of Sir Francis Vere. Patrick became Earl of Tullibardine after William was made Earl of Atholl in 1628.
- Anne Murray, known as the king's mistress. She married Patrick Lyon, Lord Glamis, in 1595.
- Lilias Murray married John Grant of Freuchie on 21 June 1591.
- Jean Murray, who married Patrick Hepburn of Waughton
- A son who was killed at battle of Glenlivet in 1594.

Peerage of Scotland
New creation	Earl of Tullibardine; 1606–1613	Succeeded by William Murray
