= Mungo Graham of Rathernis =

Scottish landowner and courtier

Mungo Graham of Rathernis (died 1589) was a Scottish landowner and courtier.

== Career ==
He was a son of William Graham, 2nd Earl of Montrose and Janet Keith, a daughter of William Keith, 3rd Earl Marischal. His lands were at Rathernis in Strathearn in Ardoch parish in Perthshire, also known as "Rottearns", with fishing on the Allan Water. He married Marjorie Edmonstone, a daughter of William Edmonstone of Duntreath.

Graham served as a Master of Household to James VI of Scotland from 1579. There were several appointees, who served for occasional terms or seasons. Amongst their duties, the Masters of Household supervised the allocation of food to members of the royal household. The royal household accounts for this time do not survive. Graham approached the burgh council of Edinburgh in July 1579 seeking a loan of £5000 Scots for the King's expenses.

There is a record of a messenger sent from Stirling Castle in August 1579 to Mungo Graham and his nephew, John Murray, the younger laird of Tullibardine, who was another courtier and Master of Household living in Perthshire. The letter may have summoned them to join the king's household.

In October 1580, the English border officer John Forster reported potential changes at the Scottish court, due to the new favourite Esmé Stewart, 1st Duke of Lennox. He heard that John Stewart of Traquair would become Comptroller of Scotland and his brother William Stewart would be the Master of the Wardrobe. Forster thought the Masters of Household would all be replaced except Mungo Graham. The changes outlined by Forster did not take place.

In 1581 James VI sent his well-beloved servants including Mungo Graham, two other Master Households, and the master of the wine cellar or sommelier Jerome Bowie, to buy wine in Edinburgh, St Andrews, and Dundee. In 1584, there were three other masters of the royal household with Graham: Alan Cathcart, 4th Lord Cathcart, John Murray younger of Tullibardine, and James Colville of East Wemyss.

In 1589, James VI married Anne of Denmark, and expected that she would sail from Denmark to Scotland. Mungo Graham bought spices from Jonet Guthrie worth £333-6s-8d Scots for a welcome feast, perhaps to prepare the spiced wine called hippocras, "quhen her majestie was looked for to have cumit hame". She was delayed by "contrary winds" and remained in Norway over the winter instead. Spiced hippocras wine had been served at Holyroodhouse in 1503 to welcome Margaret Tudor, the bride of James IV.

Mungo Graham died on 26 October 1589. His widow, Marjorie Edmondstone married John Maxwell of Pollok.
