= List of listed buildings in Kinnoull, Perth and Kinross =

This is a list of listed buildings in the parish of Kinnoull in Perth and Kinross, Scotland.

== List ==
Name	Location	Date Listed	Grid Ref. (Note: Sometimes known as OSGB36, the grid reference (where provided) is based on the British national grid reference system used by the Ordnance Survey. • "Guide to National Grid". Ordnance Survey. • "Get-a-map". Ordnance Survey.)	Geo-coordinates	Notes	LB Number (Note: Historic Environment Scotland assign a unique alphanumeric identifier to each designated site in Scotland, for listed buildings this always begins with "LB", for example "LB12345".)	Image
Perth, Mount Tabor Road, Gean Cottage Including Former Wash House And Boundary Wall				56°23′53″N 3°24′32″W	Category B	49843	Upload Photo
Kingswells Farmhouse				56°28′22″N 3°21′33″W	Category B	10981	Upload Photo
Mcduff's Monument Murrayshall Hill				56°24′42″N 3°21′56″W	Category B	10982	Upload Photo
Balthayock House, Bridge Over Hail Pool				56°23′35″N 3°20′00″W	Category A	10986	Upload Photo
Perth, Bridge-End, Muirhall Road, Hollybush House And Greenbank Including Gatepiers And Boundary Walls				56°23′58″N 3°25′06″W	Category C(S)	39580	Upload Photo
Balthayock Castle				56°23′30″N 3°20′22″W	Category B	10985	Upload Photo
Westwood Cottage				56°23′31″N 3°20′44″W	Category B	10987	Upload Photo
Lynedoch Obelisk Murrayshall Hill				56°24′47″N 3°21′19″W	Category B	10983	Upload Photo

== Key ==
The scheme for classifying buildings in Scotland is:

- Category A: "buildings of national or international importance, either architectural or historic; or fine, little-altered examples of some particular period, style or building type."
- Category B: "buildings of regional or more than local importance; or major examples of some particular period, style or building type, which may have been altered."
- Category C: "buildings of local importance; lesser examples of any period, style, or building type, as originally constructed or moderately altered; and simple traditional buildings which group well with other listed buildings."

In March 2016 there were 47,288 listed buildings in Scotland. Of these, 8% were Category A, and 50% were Category B, with the remaining 42% being Category C.
