= Patrick Lyon, 1st Earl of Kinghorne =

Scottish landowner (c. 1575–1615)

Patrick Lyon, 1st Earl of Kinghorne (c. 1575 – 1615) was a Scottish landowner.

Patrick Lyon was the son of John Lyon, 8th Lord Glamis and Elizabeth Abernethy, only daughter of Alexander Abernethy, 6th Lord Saltoun.

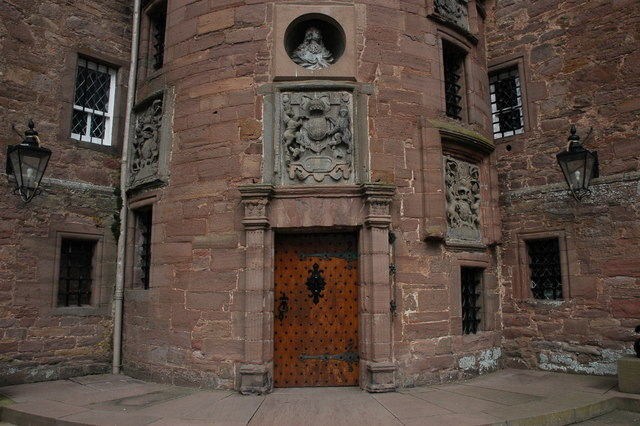
The spiral stair at Glamis Castle was the work of Patrick Lyon, Earl of Kinghorne

His father was killed in 1578 by a gunshot wound to the head during a fight in the streets of Stirling with the followers of David Lindsay, 11th Earl of Crawford. Crawford was a good shot and Glamis presented an easy target as he was so tall, according to the historian David Hume of Godscroft. His uncle Thomas, Master of Glamis became head of the family, and tutor and curator of the young Lord Glamis. The portrait of the young Lord Glamis was made in 1583 by Adrian Vanson and still hangs at Glamis Castle.

In June 1598 he was declared a rebel for not appearing to resolve his feud with the Earl of Crawford according to new legislation. James VI sent Glamis with the Duke of Lennox, the Earl of Mar, and the Master of Glamis to Penicuik in February 1593 to search for the rebel Earl of Bothwell. Glamis fell from his horse and broke three ribs.

In September 1594, James VI raised a force against the northern earls and met them at the battle of Glenlivet. When the king was at Perth, the aunt of Lord Glamis, Euphemia Douglas wrote to the Laird of Balthayock, asking him to come with Glamis Castle with his followers, armed and ready to follow the king to the north.

In 1601, he killed one of his servants (called Johnson), who had insulted him and shot at him in a churchyard in a Sunday. The king forgave him, and a church minister Mr Henry Blyth preached against this as contradictory to the king's vow to do justice.

In February 1603, he was asked to appear at Perth to resolve a feud with Sir Robert Crichton of Cluny following the murder of William Meldrum of Moncoffer. Patrick Lyon was made Earl of Kinghorne in 1606. He made a major restoration and reworking of Glamis Castle around the year 1606, commemorated by an inscription "Built by Patrick, Lord Glamis, and D[ame] Anna Murray" on the stair tower.

== Death ==
Patrick Lyon, 1st Earl of Kinghorne died in Edinburgh in December 1615, around the age of 40.

== Family ==
In May 1595 he married Anne Murray who was reputed to be the mistress of James VI of Scotland, at Stirling. There would be a banquet at the "Countess of Mar's new house", Mar's Wark, and celebrations at Gask, the house of Anne's father, the Laird of Tullibardine. Neither James VI or Anne of Denmark attended the wedding because Anne was ill at Linlithgow Palace. The king and queen had planned to come to the wedding banquet on 1 June, to be celebrated with "great triumph" at Stirling Castle.

Anne Murray was reported in May to be trying to make the wedding a peaceful occasion among feuds. The marriage was of political and factional significance in Scotland, controversially arranged by the Earl of Mar without the knowledge of the Master of Glamis. The Master of Glamis had wanted Patrick to marry a sister of the Laird of Cessford. Mar's actions were part of his feud with the Chancellor of Scotland, John Maitland of Thirlestane.

The children of Anne and Patrick Lyon, 1st Earl of Kinghorne were:

- Frederick Lyon (d. 1660). Had descendants.
- Anne Lyon (d. 8 February 1637), who married William Hay, 10th Earl of Erroll. Had descendants.
- Jean Lyon (d. 2 February 1618).
- John Lyon, 2nd Earl of Kinghorne (13 August 1596 - 12 May 1646). Had descendants.
- Patrick Lyon (b. 1600).
- James Lyon (1602 - August 1641).
- Elizabeth Lyon (b. 1608).

Peerage of Scotland
New creation	Earl of Kinghorne; 1606–1615	Succeeded by John Lyon
Preceded by John Lyon	Lord Glamis; 1578–1615	Succeeded by John Lyon
