= Patrick Murray, 1st Earl of Tullibardine =

Scottish aristocrat

Patrick Murray, 1st Earl of Tullibardine (died 1644) was a Scottish aristocrat.

He was a son of John Murray, 1st Earl of Tullibardine and Catherine Drummond, a daughter of David, 2nd Lord Drummond and Lilias Ruthven.

He became a gentleman of the bedchamber to James VI and I. He was knighted on 25 July 1603 at the coronation of James I. On 12 June 1607 Murray dined with the King at the Clothworker's Hall in London and was made free of the Company.

He had letters of denization in 1613, and was keeper of the Parks of Theobalds in 1617, as successor to Miles Whittaker.

Patrick Murray became Earl of Tullibardine (new creation) in January 1628 when his older brother, William Murray, 2nd Earl of Tullibardine was made Earl of Atholl.

== Marriages ==
In 1603 Patrick Murray married Prudence Bulmer, a daughter of the English mining entrepreneur Bevis Bulmer. She was the widow of John Beeston, a nephew of the Cheshire landowner Hugh Beeston. They were granted a royal pension of £300 on 18 January 1604.

He married secondly, in 1613, Elizabeth Denton or Dent, widow of the English soldier Sir Francis Vere. Their children included:

- James Murray, 2nd Earl of Tullibardine (1617-1670)
- Charles Murray
- Francis Murray
- William Murray (died 1646)
- Patrick Murray (1637-1640)
