= William Stone (mercer) =

Sir William Stone (died 1607) was a London mercer and alderman who sold fabrics to the British royal family.

== Career ==
He was a son of Reginald Stone, a London fishmonger. He was based at Cheapside but seems also to have owned a house at Leyton.

He sent silks to Scotland worth £200 for the royal wedding in 1589.

He was knighted by King James I at Ruckholt, the house of Michael Hicks, on 16 June 1604. Hicks's brother, Baptist Hicks, was a mercer trading like Stone.

In January 1605, Anne of Denmark's vice-chamberlain George Carew was given £6,108 from the treasury to pay her debt to Stone. In February 1607, Carew received another amount to pay the queen's debts to Stone and others.

Stone supplied fabric used for masque costumes at court. With Thomas Henshawe, and the brewer Francis Snellinge, he petitioned the Earl of Salisbury for a debt of £300 for goods sold to the French ambassador, Christophe de Harlay, Count of Beaumont.

Stone was Master of the Clothworkers' Company, and welcomed King James to Clothworkers' Hall on 12 June 1607. He was also a member of the Turkey Company. The Clothworkers' Company has his portrait, showing a carpet on a table.

John Chamberlain wrote that Stone died at his house in Leyton on 14 September 1607 of a fever, after drinking a quart of sack to toast King James' health. He was buried at St Mary Magdalen, Milk Street.

His wife was called Barbara. Arrangements were made to pay a royal debt of £1000 to her in 1608. His daughter Julian Stone married Nicholas Herrick, a London goldsmith, and was the mother of the poet Robert Herrick. Elizabeth Stone married Sir William Campion.

Richard Johnson dedicated his 1607 work The Pleasant Conceits of Old Hobson, The Merry Londoner (London, 1607) to Stone.
