= John Graham, 3rd Earl of Montrose =

Scottish peer and Chancellor of the University of St Andrews

The Right Honourable John Graham
- Earl of Montrose
- Coat of arms
- Tenure: 1571–1608
- Predecessor: William Graham, 2nd Earl of Montrose
- Successor: John Graham, 4th Earl of Montrose
- Born: 1548
- Died: 9 November 1608 (aged 59–60)
- Spouse: Jean Drummond
- Issue: John Graham, 4th Earl of Montrose; Hon. William Graham; Hon. Robert Graham; Lady Lilias Graham
- Father: Robert Graham, Master of Graham
- Mother: Margaret Fleming, Countess of Atholl

John Graham, 3rd Earl of Montrose (1548 – 9 November 1608) was a Scottish peer and Chancellor of the University of St Andrews from 1599 to 1604. He was Lord High Commissioner to the Parliament of Scotland, from 1605 to 1606.

== Family background ==
He was the son of Robert Graham, Master of Graham, and Margaret Fleming, a daughter of Malcolm Fleming, 3rd Lord Fleming. His father was killed at the Battle of Pinkie Cleugh on 10 September 1547.

His maternal grandmother, Janet Fleming, was a daughter of James IV of Scotland.

== Career ==
A contemporary provided the following summary:

He is an Erle of small power, havinge but few gentlemen of his surname except the Larde of Fyntra situate in the Leuenax and dwellinge in the north. His revenues are not greate, yet being a man civil and gyven to quyet he hath matched with the houses of E[rskine].

When Regent Morton made a progress in September 1575, the Earl of Montrose and William Murray of Tullibardine escorted him from Stirling Castle to Kincardine Castle and he had dinner at Tullibardine the day after.

In July 1584 Montrose was at court at Falkland Palace and wrote to the lawyer Patrick Vaus of Barnbarroch asking him to help in the legal case of his friend Patrick Montcur of Montcur.

The English politician Sir Robert Cecil noted that Montrose was a supporter of the Earl of Huntly in the "slaughter of Moray".

The Graham family had a feud with Sir John Sandilands, who was the legal tutor of Sandilands of Calder. John Sandilands fought with the Master of Montrose on two occasions. James VI made Sandilands and Montrose agree in November 1599.

Montrose was made Chancellor of Scotland in 1599. Soon after when he was at Holyrood Palace speaking with Anne of Denmark in her chamber, they were interrupted by James Forman, an Edinburgh burgess, who complained about various policies and a tax on wine and criticised the comptroller David Murray and the king. Around the same time, the chancellor's clothes and some silver were stolen from his house and sold on.

== Anne of Denmark at Stirling ==
After James VI had gone to England in 1603 at the Union of the Crowns, Montrose wrote to him on 10 May and 13 May about Anne of Denmark. She had gone to Stirling Castle to collect her son Prince Henry without authority. During discussions at the castle she had a miscarriage. Montrose was anxious to defuse a continuing political quarrel. He explained that the companions of the queen at Stirling had not set out to take the Prince from the custody of the Earl of Mar. Although Mar claimed they were "movers and enticers of her highness to that enterprise, they themselves by oaths protest, that they had no intention at all, except her grace's convoy, being required by her missives thereto".

Montrose wrote to James VI again on 1 June, when Anne of Denmark was in Edinburgh with Prince Henry and Princess Elizabeth. Montrose arranged and paid for the accommodation in John Kinloch's house in the Canongate for some of the English ladies who had come to meet Anne of Denmark. The party included Lucy Russell, Countess of Bedford.

== Marriage and children ==
Montrose married Jean Drummond, a daughter of David, Lord Drummond and Lilias Ruthven. Their children included:

- John Graham, 4th Earl of Montrose
- William Graham of Braco, who married (1) Mary Keith, daughter of William Keith, Master of Marischal, and (2) Mary Cunningham, daughter of Sir James Edmonstone of Duntreath, and widow of John Cunningham of Cunninghamhead
- Robert Graham of Scotston, who married Anne Lindsay, daughter of Alexander Lindsay, 1st Lord Spynie and Jean Lyon, a daughter of John Lyon, 8th Lord Glamis
- Lilias Graham, who married John Fleming, 1st Earl of Wigtown

== Ancestry ==
John Graham, 3rd Earl of Montrose's ancestors in three generations
John Graham, 3rd Earl of Montrose	Father: Robert Graham, Master of Montrose	Paternal Grandfather: William Graham, 2nd Earl of Montrose	Paternal Great-grandfather: William Graham, 1st Earl of Montrose
John Graham, 3rd Earl of Montrose	Father: Robert Graham, Master of Montrose	Paternal Grandfather: William Graham, 2nd Earl of Montrose	Paternal Great-grandmother: Annabella Drummond
John Graham, 3rd Earl of Montrose	Father: Robert Graham, Master of Montrose	Paternal Grandmother: Lady Janet Keith	Paternal Great-grandfather: William Keith, 2nd Earl Marischal
John Graham, 3rd Earl of Montrose	Father: Robert Graham, Master of Montrose	Paternal Grandmother: Lady Janet Keith	Paternal Great-grandmother: Lady Elizabeth Gordon
John Graham, 3rd Earl of Montrose	Mother: Margaret Fleming	Maternal Grandfather: Malcolm Fleming, 3rd Lord Fleming	Maternal Great-grandfather: John Fleming, 2nd Lord Fleming
John Graham, 3rd Earl of Montrose	Mother: Margaret Fleming	Maternal Grandfather: Malcolm Fleming, 3rd Lord Fleming	Maternal Great-grandmother: Eupheme Drummond
John Graham, 3rd Earl of Montrose	Mother: Margaret Fleming	Maternal Grandmother: Lady Janet Stewart	Maternal Great-grandfather: James IV of Scotland
John Graham, 3rd Earl of Montrose	Mother: Margaret Fleming	Maternal Grandmother: Lady Janet Stewart	Maternal Great-grandmother: Isabel Stewart

Political offices
Preceded by The Lord Maitland of Thirlestane	Lord Chancellor of Scotland; 1599–1604	Succeeded by The Earl of Dunfermline
Parliament of Scotland
Preceded by Union of the Crowns	Lord High Commissioner; 1605–1606	Succeeded by The Duke of Lennox
Academic offices
Preceded by Lord Menmuir	Chancellor of the University of St Andrews; 1599–1604	Succeeded by George Gledstanes; Archbishop of St Andrews
Peerage of Scotland
Preceded by William Graham	Earl of Montrose; 1571–1608	Succeeded by John Graham
