= Kincardine, Sutherland =

Coordinates: 57.8725°N 4.3525°W

Kincardine: Scottish Gaelic: Cinn Chàrdainn
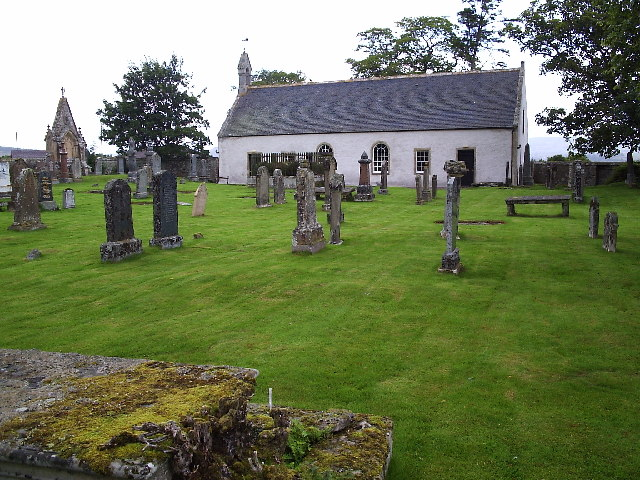
- Kincardine Old Parish Church.

- Location within the Sutherland area
- OS grid reference: NH607894
- Council area: Highland
- Lieutenancy area: Sutherland
- Country: Scotland
- Sovereign state: United Kingdom
- Post town: Ardgay
- Postcode district: IV24
- Dialling code: 01863
- Police: Scotland
- Fire: Scottish
- Ambulance: Scottish
- UK Parliament: Caithness, Sutherland and East Ross

Kincardine (Scottish Gaelic: Cinn Chàrdainn) is a small hamlet in Sutherland, situated on the west end of the south shore of the Dornoch Firth. The village of Ardgay is less than 1 mile north west of Kincardine along the A836 coast road. It lies within the civil parish of Kincardine and Community council of Ardgay and District.

== Etymology ==
The name Kincardine, as with other locations so-named, may be a Gaelic adaptation of a Pictish name. The second element is the Pictish *carden, perhaps meaning "encampment" or "brake". The first element represent Gaelic ceann substituting an original Pictish *pen, both meaning "end, head, top", giving an aboriginal form of *Pencarden.

== Landmarks ==
The church of Kincardine, built in 1799, is on a site near Kincardine Burn, which passes to the north-west before flowing into Dornoch Firth.

The church was closed in 1955 and since 1993 has been a Heritage Centre in the care of the Kyle of Sutherland Heritage Society. A French naval bell donated to the church in 1778 by Admiral Sir John Ross, of Balnagown, was moved in 1947 to the church presently used in Ardgay, formerly the United Free church, when church services were transferred there.

North-west of the church, on Kincardine Burn, lies Kincardine Mills. The building dates from 18th to early 19th century, although it is now a ruin, albeit a substantial two-storey building. It is laid out on an L plan.

In the late 19th century remains of an old castle were recorded on a site between the church and the sea at Kincardine, next to a steep bank, called “Bank of the Gate”. But at the present time, no remains are visible at the site.

== History ==
The church of Kincardine is first mentioned in 1227, when the minister of the church attended a meeting of the clerics regarding a dispute between the bishops of Moray and Ross. It was dedicated to St. Columba. Although the present church was built in 1799, it seems to be located at the site of the previous church building.

In the mid 16th century, the Bishop of Ross granted lands in and around Kincardine to the Lord of Balnagown, head of the Clan Ross, of the same family as the Earl of Ross. These were the village of Ardgay, the Kirktown of Kincardine (including the Salmon fishing rights) and the mill of Kincardine.

In 1657 David Ross, Lord of Balnagown was in possession of the same lands, with the some difference in detail. The castle at Kincardine was recorded in 1845 as having belonged to the same family, but was then a ruin.

Until the late 1790s the church was thatched with heather, but when the roof caught fire, the building was destroyed. The minister M.A. Gallie rebuilt the church at the same site and his initials and the date 1799 still appear carved above the lintel of the door on the south side of the church.

== See also ==
- Kincardine (disambiguation)
