= Christophe de Harlay, Count of Beaumont =

French politician and diplomat

Christophe de Harlay, Count of Beaumont (1570–1615) was a French politician and diplomat who served as ambassador to England.

He was the son of Achillee de Harlay, seigneur de Beaumont (1504–1572) and Catherine de Thou. He married Anne Rabot in June 1599. She was a daughter of Ennemond Rabot d'Illins (1543–1603).

== At the court of Elizabeth I ==
Beaumont came to England in November 1601 to advise on maritime issues and subsequently replaced the resident French ambassador, Monsieur de Boissise. In March 1602 Beaumont reported news that James VI of Scotland would send 2,000 men to fight in Ireland. He used the word "sauvages", savages, for these soldiers. Beaumont heard that the King of Spain was bankrolling a faction in Scotland, and Henry IV's ambassador to Scotland, Charles Cauchon de Maupas de Tour, should know about it. De Tour was bringing a gift of mules and dogs to James VI.

In July 1602 his wife attended Elizabeth I at Greenwich Palace and gave her maids of honour gifts of French purses, fans, and masks. Beaumont encountered Michael Balfour, Laird of Burleigh who was travelling to France to buy weapons in quantity.

Beaumont sent updates on the health of Elizabeth and news of her death to Henry IV of France. Some of his reports suggest that Elizabeth did not name her successor, although he also wrote that she had told William Cecil and the Earl of Nottingham in private that James VI would be king of England.

In February 1603 he commented on the character of Anne of Denmark, the queen consort of James VI. Some allies of James had told him she was cruel and ambitious, fort cruelle, bròuillonne et sanguinaire, and hoped to rule Scotland through her son Prince Henry after the death of her husband. There seems to be no further evidence of this intrigue, though Anne and James had quarrelled bitterly over the upbringing of her son.

== Beaumont and Rosny ==
Beaumont had a lodging on Butcher Row in the Strand, where Maximilien de Béthune, Duke of Sully, at this time known as the Marquis de Rosny, stayed at first when he came to congratulate James VI and I on his acquisition of the throne of England. Some of the French got into a fight, and a Londoner was killed. Sully insisted on handing over a young French nobleman, a relative of Beaumont's, to the authorities as the murderer, expecting he would be executed. Beaumont secured his release. Sully and Beaumont had dinner with King James at Greenwich Palace on 29 June 1603. They sat at the king's table which was decorated with a diamond studded pyramid serving as a cupboard for silverware. The conversation was mostly about hunting and the warm weather.

According to the Venetian diplomat Scaramelli, Beaumont managed to upset King James with an unfortunate remark suggesting that Arbella Stuart was a suitable successor to Queen Elizabeth. In April 1603, King James wrote to Henry IV of France to appoint another diplomat, Charles Cauchon de Maupas du Tour, who had been a success in Scotland, as the French Ambassador in Ordinary, resident in England, instead of Beaumont. Henry IV was displeased by a complaint about his diplomats and was eventually satisfied that Beaumont was the victim of a slander.

Before he left England, Sully bought jewels for Anne of Denmark and the women of her household with Beaumont's advice, as gifts from Henry IV. They gave her a mirror of Venice crystal in a gold box set with diamonds, a gold table clock with diamonds to Lucy Russell, Countess of Bedford, a gold box with the French king's portrait to Lady Rich and a pearl and diamond necklace to "Lady Rosmont". They gave a diamond ring to "Margaret Aisan, a favourite lady of the queen's bedchamber", this was probably Margaret Hartsyde, a Scottish servant who lacked the aristocratic status of the other women. There were jewels for the Earl of Lennox, for Sir Thomas Erskine, Roger Aston, and a gold cup for one of Sir Robert Cecil's clerks. Sully left money with Beaumont for further gifts and rewards. In his Memoirs, Sully explains that they carefully chose the recipients to build a pro-French faction, without arousing jealousy among the courtiers.

Anne of Denmark had not yet arrived in London. Sully's brother-in-law, Andre de Cochefilet, Count of Vauvineux, met her as she was travelling towards Northampton. Harlay thought she was a Catholic and heard that she secretly wore a little cross at her breast with a relic of the True Cross. When Harlay met her on 13 August 1603, he found her "lively and spirited". He attended the dinner for the Order of the Garter at Windsor Castle in June 1603, and the coronation on 25 July 1603.

== Winchester ==
In October 1603, King James and Anne of Denmark moved to Winchester to avoid the plague in London. Beaumont attended a masque produced by Anne of Denmark for her son, Prince Henry's Welcome at Winchester. He commented that the performance was "rustic", in the sense of unsophisticated (rather than in the pastoral genre), and served mainly to raise the queen's spirits, and she was planning a superior and more costly event for Christmas, realised as The Masque of Indian and China Knights and The Vision of the Twelve Goddesses.

Before the court returned to London, according to Arbella Stuart, the Spanish ambassador the Count of Villamediana organised a dinner for Anne de Rabot, asking her to invite some English ladies. She brought the Countess of Bedford, Lady Penelope Rich, Lady Susan de Vere, and "Lady Dorothy", perhaps Dorothy Percy, Countess of Northumberland or more likely Dorothy Hastings who danced in several masques. Anne Rabot's choice of dining companions included women of the former faction of the late Earl of Essex. Dudley Carleton claimed this dinner was not a success, that Villamediana and Beaumont were "half falling out" over leading the dancing, and the guests "all returned very ill satisfied for cheer or entertainment". Carleton made fun of Beaumount and calls him the "Little French Monsieur" and "Little Beaumont".

Beaumont's colleague, the embassy secretary, D'Auval, had brought a portrait of Marie de' Medici for Anne of Denmark. He left Winchester to return to France and King James gave him a jewel worth 150 crowns. D'Auval returned, and in 1605 visited Scotland.

== London ==
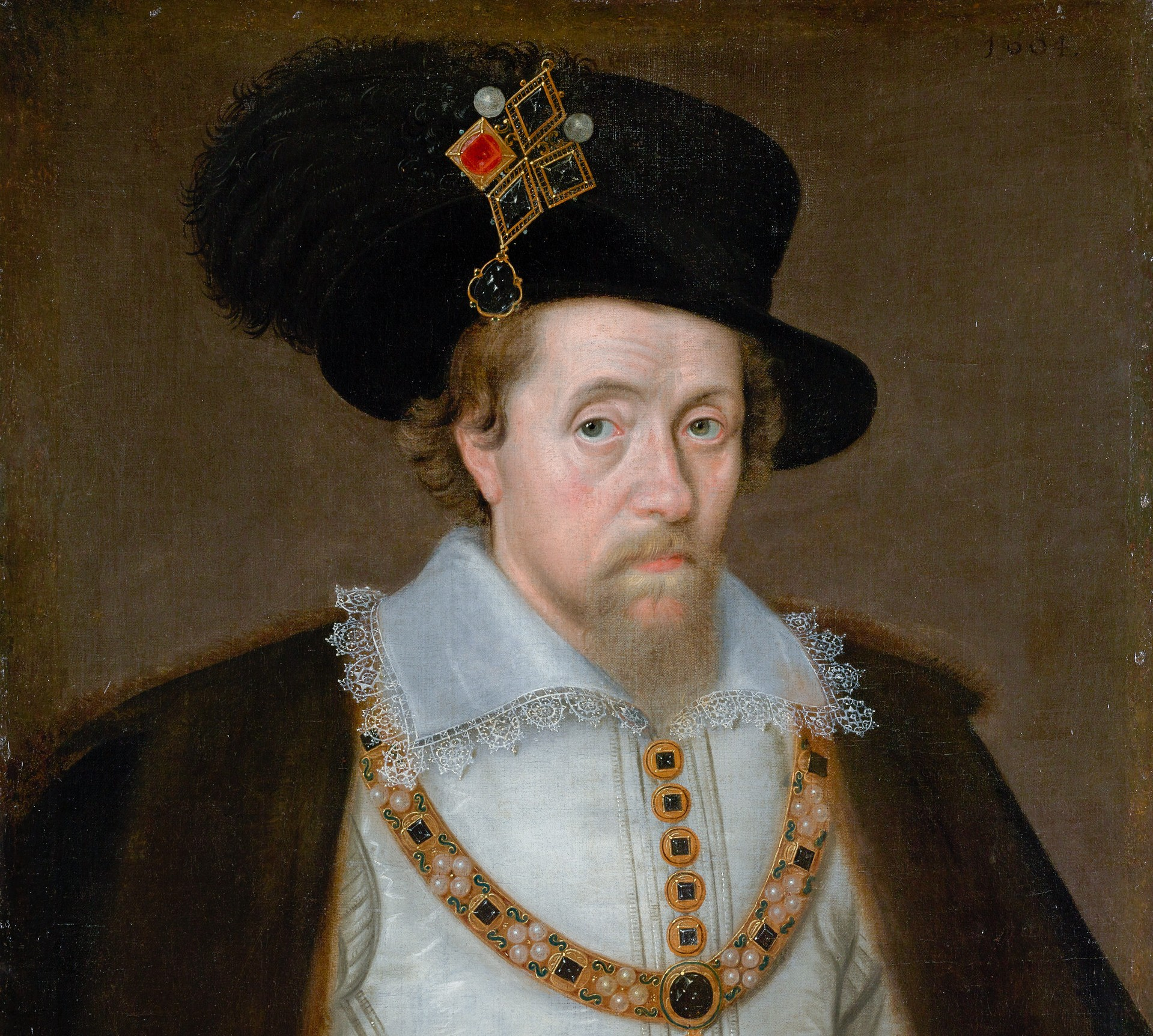
Beaumont was involved in the sale of the Sancy diamond to James VI and I, which the king used as a pendant for the Mirror of Great Britain

Beaumont was not invited to see The Vision of Twelve Goddesses because of diplomatic rivalries, but attended a sword dance performed by Scottish courtiers at Hampton Court on 6 January 1604 in the queen's presence chamber. Villamediana wrote that Beaumont had been ambushed and taken to the queen's chamber for the Scottish gentlemen's masque, as he was hoping for an invitation to The Vision. Beaumont disapproved of Anne of Denmark's plans for Prince Henry to marry a Spanish princess, but his disagreements with Villamediana about precedence were motivated by requirements to uphold national prestige.

Beaumont cultivated the company of the Earl of Northumberland and offered him the services of his chef. A servant of the Earl visited the stables of the ambassador at "Mouldsey" (Molesey near Hampton Court) to view some horses. Beaumont met the Jesuit Henry Garnet twice, the first time at Walsingham House in Seething Lane, a London house of the Earl of Northumberland.

His daughter was baptised in London in May 1604, Anne of Denmark was sponsor, and Beaumont invited the Spanish ambassador as act of reconciliation. The child, Anna Sophia died in 1605 and was buried in Westminster Abbey, where there is an obelisk to her memory with a Latin inscription and the Harlay heraldry.

Beaumont and his cousin, Robert de Harlay, Baron de Monglat, a brother of Nicolas de Harlay, seigneur de Sancy, showed the 53 carat Sancy diamond to Robert Cecil, and King James bought it for the agreed price of 60,000 French crowns. James had the diamond set with stones from the "Great H of Scotland" in a new jewel called the "Mirror of Great Britain" and wore it on his hat.

Beaumont was angered again over the issue of precedence with Spanish ambassador, and stayed in bed in January 1605 claiming illness during the creation of Prince Charles as Duke of York and the Queen's masque, The Masque of Blackness. Lewes Lewknor came to see him, and Beaumont subjected him to lengthy tirade, which was reported by the Venetian ambassador Nicolò Molin.

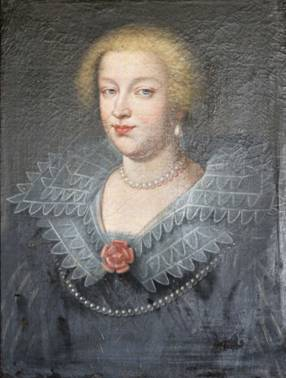
Charlotte des Essarts, Countess of Romarantin

Anne de Rabot wrote to Robert Cecil, now Viscount Cranborne, on 5 April 1605 asking that a condemned priest should be banished rather than executed.

Beaumont left England on 5 November 1605, ahead of the discovery of the Gunpowder Plot, and there were suspicions that he had some knowledge of it. Molin heard that Henry IV wrote to King James in December 1605 that his ambassador could not have been involved. After Henry Garnet was captured at Hindlip Hall in January 1606, and taken to the Tower of London, he was asked about his meetings with Beaumont and with Spanish diplomats.

Beaumont left a bill of exchange of £300 for a debt for fabrics with William Stone. As the bill seemed worthless, Stone, with Thomas Henshawe and Francis Snellinge, petitioned the Earl of Salisbury for payment.

One of the French companions of Anne Rabot in London was Charlotte des Essarts (1580-1651), a relation of Beaumont, who subsequently found favour with Henry IV at the French court and was made Countess of Romarantin.

== Diplomatic gifts ==
John Chamberlain wrote that Beaumont had blotted his reputation by "mechanicall tricks" when he left England, by asking for a greater gift of silver plate, receiving two horses and "pictures great and small with jewells", and gifts from the noblemen of his acquaintance. By "mechanical", Chamberlain means conduct unworthy of the diplomatic class.

The goldsmiths William Herrick and Arnold Lulls were paid in October 1606 for "two pictures of gold set with stone" which Anne of Denmark had given to Beaumont and his wife Anne Rabot, the portrait miniatures that Chamberlain mentions, which cost £459. Sir Robert Cecil gave Beaumont portraits of himself and his father William Cecil by John de Critz which cost him £8. There is a portrait of Beaumont at Hatfield House aged 34 painted in 1605.
