= Elizabeth Dent, Countess of Tullibardine =

English aristocrat and landowner

Elizabeth Dent, Countess of Tullibardine (1591-1656) was an English aristocrat and landowner.

She was the daughter of John Dent and Alice Grant. John Dent was originally from Leicester and became a salter and merchant in London.

She married the veteran soldier Francis Vere (d. 1609) on 26 October 1607. Rowland Whyte commented that some "smile at it for it is said she is not the fairest."

There was discussion about her marrying Charles Caesar, a son of her step-father, the judge Sir Julius Caesar, and John Chamberlain said she was pressured to marry Caesar. In 1613 she married Sir Patrick Murray, a son of John Murray, 1st Earl of Tullibardine, who became the 1st or 3rd Earl of Tullibardine in January 1628.

Murray had come to London with King James in 1603, and was knighted at St James Palace on 24 July 1603. His first wife was Prudence Bulmer, a daughter of the mining entrepreneur Bevis Bulmer, and widow of John Beeston who she had married in 1596. Beeston was a grandson of George Beeston who fought at Pinkie. Murray died in October 1644.

She died in 1656.

== Family ==
The children of Elizabeth Dent and Patrick Murray included:

- James Murray, Lord Gask, and 2nd or 4th Earl of Tullibardine (1617-1670), who married Lilias Drummond, a daughter of the Earl of Perth in London in May 1643.
- Charles Murray (1618-1647)
- Francis Murray (1627-1639)
- William Murray of Redcastle (d. 1646)
- Patrick Murray (1637-1640)
- Elizabeth Murray

She also mentioned her daughters Diana and Juliana in her last testament.
