= Thomas Lyon (of Auldbar) =

Scottish nobleman and official

Sir Thomas Lyon, Master of Glamis (died 1608) was a Scottish nobleman and official, Lord High Treasurer of Scotland.

== Master of Glamis ==
Lyon was the younger son of John Lyon, 7th Lord Glamis, by his wife Janet Keith, daughter of Robert, Lord Keith, and sister of the fourth Marischal. He was one of the youths who attended King James in Stirling during his minority. His original style was Sir Thomas of Auldbar and Balduckie.

On the death of his elder brother, John Lyon, 8th Lord Glamis, in 1578, he became tutor to his nephew, Patrick, ninth lord, and, being after Patrick the nearest presumptive heir to the title, was known as Master of Glamis. He married Agnes Gray, widow of Alexander Home, 5th Lord Home, who died in 1575; and his right to the keeping of Hume Castle in opposition to Andrew Kerr, commendator of Jedburgh, was confirmed by the privy council on 8 November 1578. On 17 December 1579 he gave security in £5,000 not to make trouble for the widow of John, lord Glamis, or his daughter, in their lands.' On 12 December he was relieved by the privy council of the keepership of Hume Castle.

== Raid of Ruthven, the Gowrie Regime, and exile ==
The Master of Glamis was one of the principal supporters of William Ruthven, 1st Earl of Gowrie against the ascendency of Esmé Stewart, 1st Duke of Lennox, and James Stewart, Earl of Arran, and a main contriver of the raid of Ruthven. The precise form which the conspiracy should take had not been determined when the plotters received intelligence that Lennox was aware of their design, and conspiring against them. Advantage was therefore at once taken of the king's visit to Ruthven Castle, a seat of the Earl of Gowrie, near Perth, to gain possession of his person.

On the morning of 23 August 1582 the castle was surrounded by an armed force of a thousand men, under Gowrie, Glamis, and John Erskine, Earl of Mar, so as to prevent the access of Lennox and his supporters to the king. Glamis and his friends placed before James a loyal supplication, with special reference to the wrongs committed against them by Lennox and Arran, Next day they escorted the king to Perth, and on the 30th they went on to Stirling. On arriving at Stirling the king expressed his intention to proceed to Edinburgh; but this, they informed him, was not expedient; and at last they plainly told him that either 'the duke or they should leave Scotland.' On the king moving towards the door, the Master of Glamis rudely 'laid his leg before him.' The indignity caused the king to burst into tears, whereupon Glamis made the unsympathetic comment, "Better bairns weep than bearded men".

After the king's escape from the Ruthven raiders at St Andrews in August 1583, Glamis was ordered to enter into ward in Dumbarton Castle within three days, but made his escape to Ireland. On 31 January 1583–84, he was charged to leave Scotland, England, and Ireland under pain of treason and on 29 March his adherents and those of the other banished lords were commanded to leave Edinburgh within twenty-four hours. By this time probably Glamis and his associates had arrived in Scotland, for on 17 April they captured Stirling Castle ('The Raid of Stirling'). But Gowrie was arrested two days later at Dundee; and on learning that the king was setting forth against them from Edinburgh with a force of twelve thousand men, they abandoned Stirling and fled to England, ultimately taking up their residence in a lodging in Westminster. There they entered into secret communications with Elizabeth.

At the parliament held in Scotland in the following August sentence of forfeiture was passed against the raiders, but the attempt to induce Elizabeth to deliver them up was unsuccessful. They returned, with the connivance of Elizabeth, to Scotland in October 1585. Arran's overthrow followed, and on 4 November Glamis was pardoned along with other lords and received into favour. On 7 November he was admitted a member of the privy council, and appointed captain and commander of the king's guard. In the new ministry he was also appointed Lord High Treasurer for life, with a salary of £1,000 Scots. At the parliament at Linlithgow in December an act was also passed restoring him to his estates. On 9 February 1586 he became an extraordinary lord of session.

== Later political career and the Lindsay–Lyon feud ==
The hope of the presbyterian clergy that the return of the banished lords would effect a change in the ecclesiastical policy of the king was not fulfilled. The Master of Glamis advised that it was not expedient to sound out the king, who favoured episcopacy, on reform of the kirk.

On 14 December 1586, Glamis, as the representative of his house, and David Lindsay, 11th Earl of Crawford, by one of whose followers the eighth Lord Glamis had been slain, gave mutual assurances to each other; and on 15 May 1587 they walked arm in arm before the king to and from the banquet of reconciliation at the Market Cross of Edinburgh. The feud between the two families remained, however, very much as it was before; and the king in November 1588 took the captaincy of the guard from Glamis and giving it to Alexander Lindsay, the Earl of Crawford's uncle. Glamis was offended, and a scene took place between him and Francis Stewart, 5th Earl of Bothwell. To prevent the quarrel proceeding further, Bothwell was commanded to ward within Linlithgow Palace, and Glamis within Edinburgh Castle, for arming his followers in the city. Shortly afterwards the captaincy of the guard was transferred to George Gordon, 6th Earl of Huntly.

Glamis was present with the king in the Tolbooth when the intercepted letters, revealing the treasonable communications of the Earl of Huntly and others with Spain, were opened and read. In April 1589 Glamis was surprised by Huntly at Meigle, and chased to his house of Kirkhill. On refusing to surrender, the house was set on fire on 10 April, and he was carried captive to the north, via Glamis Castle. The "indignity" done to the Master of Glamis greatly angered the king. Huntly considered shipping him to the Duke of Parms in the Spanish Netherlands as a heretic against the Catholic faith and favourer of the English. On the appearance of the king with a force at Aberdeen, Huntly set him free on 22 April. This rebellion is generally known as the Riad of the Bridge of Dee.

At the coronation of the queen Anne of Denmark, 17 May 1590, Glamis received the honour of knighthood. The favour in which he was held at court since the queen's accession began to arouse the jealousy of the chancellor John Maitland of Thirlestane. Maitland complained that he supped at Leith with the outlawed Earl of Bothwell in June 1591, and his hereditary enemy, Lord Spynie, was thereupon empowered to apprehend him. Spynie was unsuccessful, but Glamis was shortly afterwards committed to Blackness Castle, and then warded beyond the River Dee.

On 6 November 1591 he was deprived of the office of extraordinary lord of session, which was conferred on John Graham, 3rd Earl of Montrose. In August 1592 he was invited by his mother-in-law, Agnes Leslie, Countess of Morton, to Dalkeith Palace where he was restored to royal favour. Soon after, the chancellor Maitland was compelled to retire from court. In February 1593 he joined in the pursuit of the Earl of Bothwell at Penicuik. The Master fell from his horse breaking three ribs.

On 8 March 1593 he was appointed extraordinary lord of session, and on the 28 March he was admitted an ordinary lord and sat till 28 May. One of the conditions of agreement between Bothwell and the king, in August 1593 was that Glamis as well as the chancellor should retire from court till November. At a convention held at Stirling in September this agreement was renounced, and Glamis and others returned to court. Shortly afterwards Glamis and Maitland were reconciled. In February 1595-6 the eight commissioners of the exchequer, known as Octavians, were appointed, but Glamis declined to resign his office of treasurer, and he had ultimately to be compensated by a gift of £6000. From this time Thomas ceased to take a prominent part in public affairs.

In August 1598 James VI was angry that the Master of Glamis and Lord Home and the Laird of Cessford had joined for some purpose, and it was noted that he had frequent meetings with Anne of Denmark, and his wife, Euphemia Douglas was in favour with the queen. James VI instructed his lawyer Thomas Hamilton to deprive the Master of Glamis of his place as a Lord of Session in May 1599 for reasons of non-residence and also because he was "declared at the horn" for debts in several places.

He died 18 February 1608. On learning of his decease, the king is said to have exclaimed, 'that the boldest and hardiest man of his dominions was dead.'

== Family ==
Thomas married, first, Agnes, third daughter of Patrick, fifth lord Gray, and widow of Sir Robert Logan of Restalrig, and Alexander, 5th Lord Home; and Euphemia Douglas, fourth daughter of William Douglas, 6th Earl of Morton. He had a daughter Mary, married to Sir Robert Semple of Beltries, and a son John Lyon of Auldbar.

Euphemia Douglas wrote to the Laird of Balthayock in 1594, asking him to come with Glamis with his followers, armed and ready to follow the king to the north. The English diplomat George Nicholson noted that she was a favourite of Anne of Denmark in August 1598.
