= Margaret Fleming, Countess of Atholl =

Scottish courtier and landowner (1536-1586)

Margaret Fleming
- Countess of Atholl
- Known for: Lady-in-Waiting to Mary, Queen of Scots
- Born: 1536
- Died: 1586 (aged 49–50)
- Noble family: Fleming
- Spouses: Robert Graham, Master of Montrose; Thomas Erskine, Master of Erskine; John Stewart, 4th Earl of Atholl
- Issue: John Graham, 3rd Earl of Montrose; Jean Stewart; Grizel Stewart; Mary Stewart; John Stewart, 5th Earl of Atholl
- Father: Malcolm Fleming, 3rd Lord Fleming
- Mother: Janet Stewart

Margaret Fleming, Countess of Atholl (1536-1586) was a Scottish courtier and landowner rumoured to be involved in the occult. She served as lady-in-waiting to Mary, Queen of Scots.

== Career ==
She was a daughter of Malcolm Fleming, 3rd Lord Fleming and his wife, Janet Stewart, Lady Fleming, a daughter of James IV of Scotland.

She was a courtier and supporter of Mary, Queen of Scots. She is known for stories told about her by her contemporary enemies.

Richard Bannatyne, a secretary of John Knox, recorded a story that when Mary, Queen of Scots was in childbirth in Edinburgh Castle, Margaret Fleming magically transferred her labour pains to Margaret Beaton, Lady Reres. Bannatyne was an enemy and political opponent of her husband, the Earl of Atholl, whom he described as an "idolator and depender on witches."

=== The lion jewel ===
In October 1570 Mr Archibald Douglas obtained a jewel that had been made for Mary, Queen of Scots as propaganda for the Scottish succession to the English throne. He showed it to the English diplomat Thomas Randolph, who sent the jewel to London. It was said to be shaped like an antler chandelier, in Scots, a "hart horn herse". It showed Mary enthroned with two fighting lions, with the inscription "Fall what may Fall the Lion shall be Lord of All", with a motif of intertwined roses and thistles. The allusion is to the prophecy of Berlington. Randolph was horrified by the implications of this piece which he said was a token to be sent to Mary. The jewel was conjectured to have been commissioned by the "witches of Atholl", meaning apparently Margaret Fleming, Countess of Atholl, and her daughters, or her companions at Dunkeld including Mary Fleming and a French lady in waiting, Marie Pyennes, Lady Seton.

The clerk of the Privy Council, Alexander Hay, mentioned the jewel in a letter to Regent Mar in November 1570, after speaking to Thomas Randolph. Hay said Lady Atholl sent it to Mary, but it fell into Elizabeth's hands. It was no bigger than the palm of a hand, and in the shape of a "hierse of a harthorne" and "well decked with gold and enamelled". According to Hay, the design included the royal arms of Scotland and an image of Mary herself in royal robes, with a lion worrying a leopard, and the motto quoted by Randolph. The matter, wrote Hay, was "daintie" and kept secret, but it was known Elizabeth was not pleased. Richard Bannatyne also described this jewel.

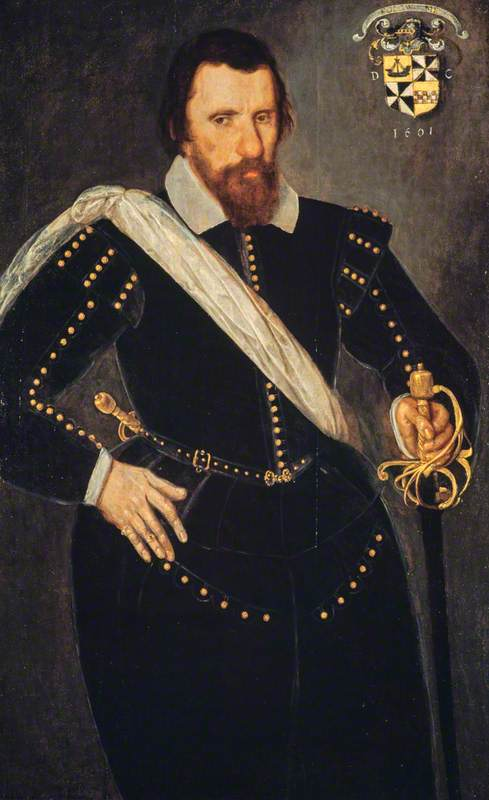
Margaret's daughter Jean Stewart married Duncan Campbell of Glenorchy (1545-1631)

On 24 April 1579 her husband, the Earl of Atholl died at Kincardine Castle, near Auchterarder, soon after attending a banquet at Stirling Castle. Margaret Fleming was also unwell. A rumour started that they had been poisoned at the request of Annabell Murray, Countess of Mar, her sister-in-law, or Regent Morton. Agnes Graham, the wife of William Murray of Tullibardine, and also a sister-in-law of Margaret Fleming, wrote to Annabell Murray assuring her that the Countess of Atholl's complaints against her were "forged lies". Margaret Fleming appeared in person before the Privy Council to petition for her son's rights.

=== Later life ===
The Earl's will mentions their tapestries, and she had 186 stones weight of new wool in the wardrobe of Balvenie Castle. Their other homes were at Dunkeld and Blair.

Mary, Queen of Scots, wrote to her regetting her son's marriage to the daughter of her enemy. Her secretary Claude Nau had brought "tokens", gifts for her supporters in Scotland, but one of the Countess's sisters told Nau not to leave them with her.

In 1583 she was in credit trouble, owing an Edinburgh tailor John Young money, and her goods, widow's terce, and income were assigned to David Lindsay, 11th Earl of Crawford, a supporter of James Stewart, Earl of Arran.

She wrote to Mary, Queen of Scots from her lodging in the Canongate of Edinburgh in March 1585. She had been away from the town because of the plague in Scotland which had delayed her writing. She was in litigation with her son the Earl of Atholl. She mentioned that the Scottish court "changes manners", meaning that at present the young king's advisors did not favour Mary, although James VI had great affection for her and her liberty. She hoped to see them together one day.

She offered to come to England and serve Mary with her daughter. Mary hoped she would come bringing news of her son James VI, and considered she would be as good a companion as Mary Seton and Mademoiselle Rallay had been. Queen Elizabeth would not allow it, and when she heard Mary was upset at the decision, she wrote to her jailer Amias Paulet with the suggestion that the request for companions was suspicious.

Margaret Fleming died in 1586.

== Families ==
She married firstly Robert Graham, Master of Montrose, by whom she had a son, John Graham, 3rd Earl of Montrose.

In 1549 she married secondly Thomas Erskine, Master of Erskine, younger brother of John Erskine, 6th Lord Erskine, with a dowry paid by Mary of Guise. They had no issue.

She married thirdly John Stewart, 4th Earl of Atholl. Their children included:

- Jean Stewart, wife of Duncan Campbell of Glenorchy, and mother of Colin Campbell of Glenorchy
- Grizel Stewart, wife of David Lindsay, 11th Earl of Crawford
- Mary Stewart, wife of Francis Hay, 9th Earl of Erroll
- John Stewart, 5th Earl of Atholl, at whose death in 1595 the earldom in default of male heirs reverted to the crown.
