= Annabell Murray, Countess of Mar =

Scottish landowner, courtier and royal servant

Annabell Murray, Countess of Mar (1536–1603), was a Scottish landowner, courtier and royal servant, the keeper of the infant James VI and his son Prince Henry at Stirling Castle.

Annabell Murray was a daughter of Sir William Murray of Tullibardine and Katherine Campbell of Glenorchy. John Murray, 1st Earl of Tullibardine was one of her nephews. In contemporary documents her name is often spelled "Annabell" or "Annable", and less frequently "Annabella".

== Lady in waiting ==
She was a lady in waiting to Mary of Guise, who gave her clothes. Her name in the household roll was written by the French clerk as "Anaple Morat". In 1557, Annabell married John Erskine, Lord Erskine. In 1560 Lord Erskine opposed the establishment of the "Book of Discipline", angering John Knox. Knox later attributed this opposition to greed and the influence of his wife, who he called "a verray Jesabell". Knox may have disliked her because she was a companion of Mary of Guise, and later of Mary, Queen of Scots.

In May 1566, pregnant with James, Mary made a will and bequeathed to Annabell and her daughter Mary Erskine jewels including her belt of amethysts and pearls, a belt of chrysolite with its pendant chain, bracelets with diamonds, rubies and pearls, pearl earrings, a zibellino with a gold marten's head, and yet another belt with a miniature portrait of Henri II of France. These bequests show that the Countess of Mar was the queen's valued friend.

In 1565 Mary made John Erskine Earl of Mar. They commissioned the Edinburgh goldsmith James Cockie to make silver mounts for a rock crystal jug, engraved with their conjoined coat of arms, now known as the "Erskine ewer."

== Bringing up a King and a Prince at Stirling Castle ==
A month after giving birth to Prince James on 19 June 1566 Mary, Queen of Scots visited the Earl and Countess of Mar at Alloa Tower. In August Lord Darnley was jealous of Annabell Murray's intimacy with the queen, along with two other close companions Agnes Keith, Countess of Moray and Jean Stewart, Countess of Argyll. Annabell was given six hanks of silver thread to embroider clothes for the prince in October 1566.

In March 1567 Mary entrusted Annabell Murray with the young infant James, to be brought up at Stirling Castle. After the Earl of Bothwell married the queen in May 1567, he tried to get the prince from Stirling but the Earl of Mar stalled him with excuses.

Mary was captured by her enemies, and abdicated at Lochleven Castle. Her half-brother James became Regent and gave Annabell £500 Scots to give to the "rockers", women who rocked the king's cradle.

Elizabeth I wrote to Lord and Lady Mar in January 1569. She had heard that Mary, Queen of Scots had written to John Hamilton and her supporters in Scotland, alleging that Regent Moray aspired to the crown of Scotland and while in England had made "contracts and covenants" to further his ambition. Elizabeth wrote that this was not the truth. Lady Mar replied to this letter and gave thanks for the "token" which Elizabeth had sent her. This token may have been a diamond ring, the family also owned a silver ewer which was said to have been a gift from Elizabeth.

Lady Mar was the head of a large household serving the infant king at Stirling Castle. In 1568 James Cunningham of Drumquhassle was the Master of Household, Alexander Durham was the "provisor" (in charge of buying food and supplies), Helen Littil was the chief nurse, five ladies including Christian Stewart, granddaughter of James V, took turns to rock the royal cradle, while the four Hudson brothers played their viols, there were cooks and brewers, Margaret Balcomie washed the king's linen and she had washed the linen of Mary, Queen of Scots at Linlithgow Palace.

In January 1570, Mary, Queen of Scots, in captivity in England, sent a present of clothes to James VI at Stirling. She wanted these to be his first proper clothes, his first "doublet and long hose" provided by his mother. In her letter to the Countess of Mar, Mary said the gift did not include essential buttons, which with the rest of her jewels were kept from her, "whereto there wants such buttons as were worthy to garnish it, thanks to them who withholds from us suchlike and better." Mar obtained Mary's buttons for James three years later.

In her letters Murray described the king's well-being in formulaic terms, writing at least three times to Grey Colin Campbell, laird of Glenorchy, that "the Kingis Majestie is rycht blyth (praise to God)", a phrase which was reassuring during the years of the Marian Civil War. In one of his earliest letters James called Annabell "Lady Minny" and wrote to thank her for a gift of fruit, and ask for more. Elizabeth I of England sent a letter congratulating her on taking good care of the king on 7 February 1572. Among the childhood companions of James VI was her own son John, and her nephew Sir William Murray of Abercairny.

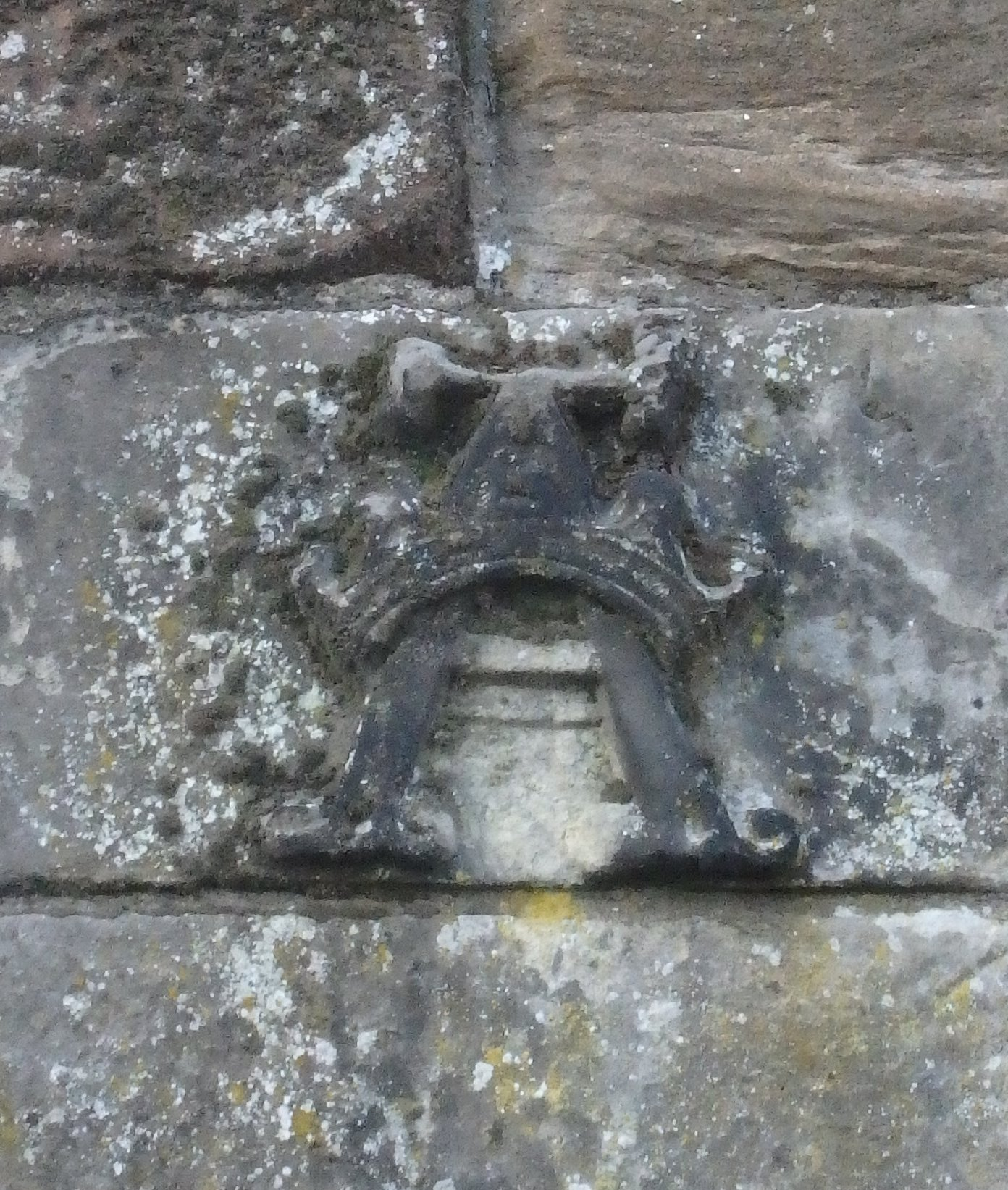
A crowned letter 'A' at Mar's Wark, Stirling, may stand for "Annabell", or "Areskine" a variant of "Erskine"

John Erskine, Earl of Mar became Regent of Scotland in 1572. This was a rise in status but the wife of a Regent had no defined political role or state duties. Mar died in October 1572 (rumoured to have been poisoned). He had made a will in 1568, wishing his widow would follow the advice of his brother and others from the Erskine family, and his friends the Laird of Lochleven, John Cunningham of Drumquhassle, and Archibald Haldane, to guide her "in all things that concerns the treatment of friends and entertainment of them to the king's grace service for the honour of the house." Annabell Murray kept these men around her. She promised to repay money Mar had borrowed from the Laird of Lochleven, giving assurances as she "would not do to no other in Scotland but to you."

Annabell Murray continued to look after the king at Stirling, with Mar's younger brother Alexander Erskine of Gogar, the Master of Mar. His three sons, George, James, and Archibald joined the king in his schoolroom at Stirling.

=== Buttons and a football for a king ===
In May 1573 the "Lang Siege" of Edinburgh Castle ended in victory for the king's party. A coffer containing the jewels of Mary, Queen of Scots was recovered from the ruins. On 28 July 1573 Regent Morton sent some of these jewels to Annabell Murray to have sewn on the king's clothes, including gold buttons enamelled in white and red, and white and black, and sets of large "horns" or "points" with enamel and engraving. Morton also had 60 new gold and silver buttons made for James VI, bought him a football, and had the king's chamber at Stirling panelled in oak, and paid the outstanding wages of James's nurse Helen Littil, his cradle-rocker Jane Oliphant, and Grissel Gray, who made the king's shirts.

Annabell Murray received a variety of jewels over the subsequent years until 1579 when the King was declared an adult and moved to Edinburgh. These included a fossil shark tooth or "serpent's tongue" mounted in gold as an amulet intended to neutralise any poisons in the king's food. On 26 September 1579, the king's clothing and jewels passed into the keeping of the new Master of the Wardrobe, James Murray, brother of the laird of Polmaise.

=== Royal schooldays ===
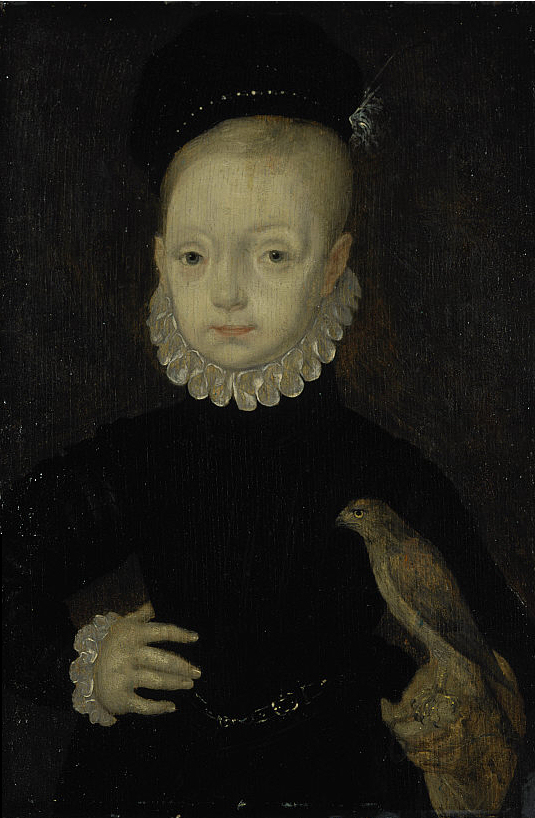
James VI by Arnold Bronckhorst, National Gallery of Scotland

In August 1573 Regent Morton told the English ambassador Henry Killigrew that he intended the Master of Mar should have more responsibility for the king. However a year later, nothing seems to have been done as Killigrew heard from the king's tutors George Buchanan and Peter Young that they were still "desirous to have him from the handling of women by whome he is yet guyded and kept, saving when he goeth to his booke." As a sign of maturity, James was dressed in adult clothing by May 1574, with a suit of red taffeta doublet and breeches.

When Killigrew visited Stirling Castle in June 1574 he met Annabell Murray on the road and passed on Queen Elizabeth's messages of good will. He saw the eight-year old king speaking French and Latin, translating from the Bible, Buchanan and Young showed him that James could do this for any passage, unrehearsed, and then they made the king dance for him. An old story tells how Annabell Murray once tried to rescue the king from physical punishment by his tutor George Buchanan, who gave her a scurrilous answer. James had a French classmate, Jérôme Groslot de l'Isle, whose father had been killed in the St. Bartholomew's Day massacre in 1572.

Andrew Melville and his nephew James Melville visited the king in 1575 and heard him "discourse walking up and down in the auld Lady Marrs hand, of knowledge and ignorance," evidently practising rhetoric with Murray. They also met the king's physician Gilbert Moncreiff at Stirling, who was an old friend of Andrew Melville, and others.

=== Kindness and ambition ===
Sir James Melville wrote about the people around the king. Annabell Murray was "wise and sharp" compared with the two Erskine commendators who were "wise and modest", and Alexander Erskine had a "true gentle nature." Peter Young was more gentle or kind to the king than George Buchanan. The master of the household John Cunningham of Drumquhassle was "ambitious and greedy." Buchanan and Drumquhassle became opponents of Regent Morton. In time the young king's household at Stirling became a threat to Regent Morton's power, and Melville's narrative suggests Morton was too slow to recognise this.

=== Pet birds and shoes ===
Surviving documents from the household include a long bill for shoes for James, which she signed with William Murray, a valet in the king's chamber. In 1578 John Murdo was the king's tailor and varlet of his wardrobe, Henry Quhite (White), the cordiner, who made the king's shoes, and James Ramsay made gloves. Murdo had been the Earl of Mar's tailor, making his velvet breeches in 1571. William Murray bought cords to hang cages for James's pet birds in the palace of Stirling Castle and hemp seed to feed them, and decorated James's study with green fabric.

In September 1577 she wrote to her brother-in-law Robert Murray of Abercairney, telling not to come to Stirling, because Regent Morton was coming. The Laird of Abercairney wanted to bring Violet Mar, a woman accused of witchcraft, to Stirling, and Annabell advised him to get written statements from her accusers.

On 24 April 1579 the Earl of Atholl died at Kincardine Castle, near Auchterarder, soon after attending a banquet at Stirling Castle. His wife Margaret Fleming, (who had been married to Murray's brother-in-law, Thomas Erskine, Master of Erskine), was also unwell. A rumour started that they had been poisoned at the request of Murray or Morton. Agnes Graham, the wife of William Murray of Tullibardine, wrote to Annabell Murray assuring her that the Countess of Atholl's complaint was "forged lies".

Around this time the king sat for his portrait, for the second time, for a Flemish painter, probably Arnold Bronckhorst. Archibald Douglas supervised the painter and sent the picture to Queen Elizabeth. Douglas said the painter needed three sittings in a day and the picture would take 9 days.

Murray was said to have had a significant role in the transfer of power from Morton to the king in 1578. Her brother, Sir William of Tullibardine (d. 1583) had a role in Morton's resignation of the regency and may also have been involved in the mini-coup at Stirling in April 1578 that expelled the Master of Mar. In December 1581 she wrote to Walter Stewart, Prior of Blantyre for payment of a reward promised for her services to the young king. She was also prominent during regime change in 1584 and was forfeited for supporting rebels and her giving succour to her son in September 1584. She gained a remission for this after a month.

=== Anne of Denmark and Prince Henry ===
She was the principal of ladies that welcomed Anne of Denmark at the shore of Leith in May 1590, with Lady Boyne, Lady Seton, Lady Thirlestane, Lady Dudhope, and others. At the coronation of Anna of Denmark on 17 May 1590 she held the queen's train and opened her gown for the anointing.

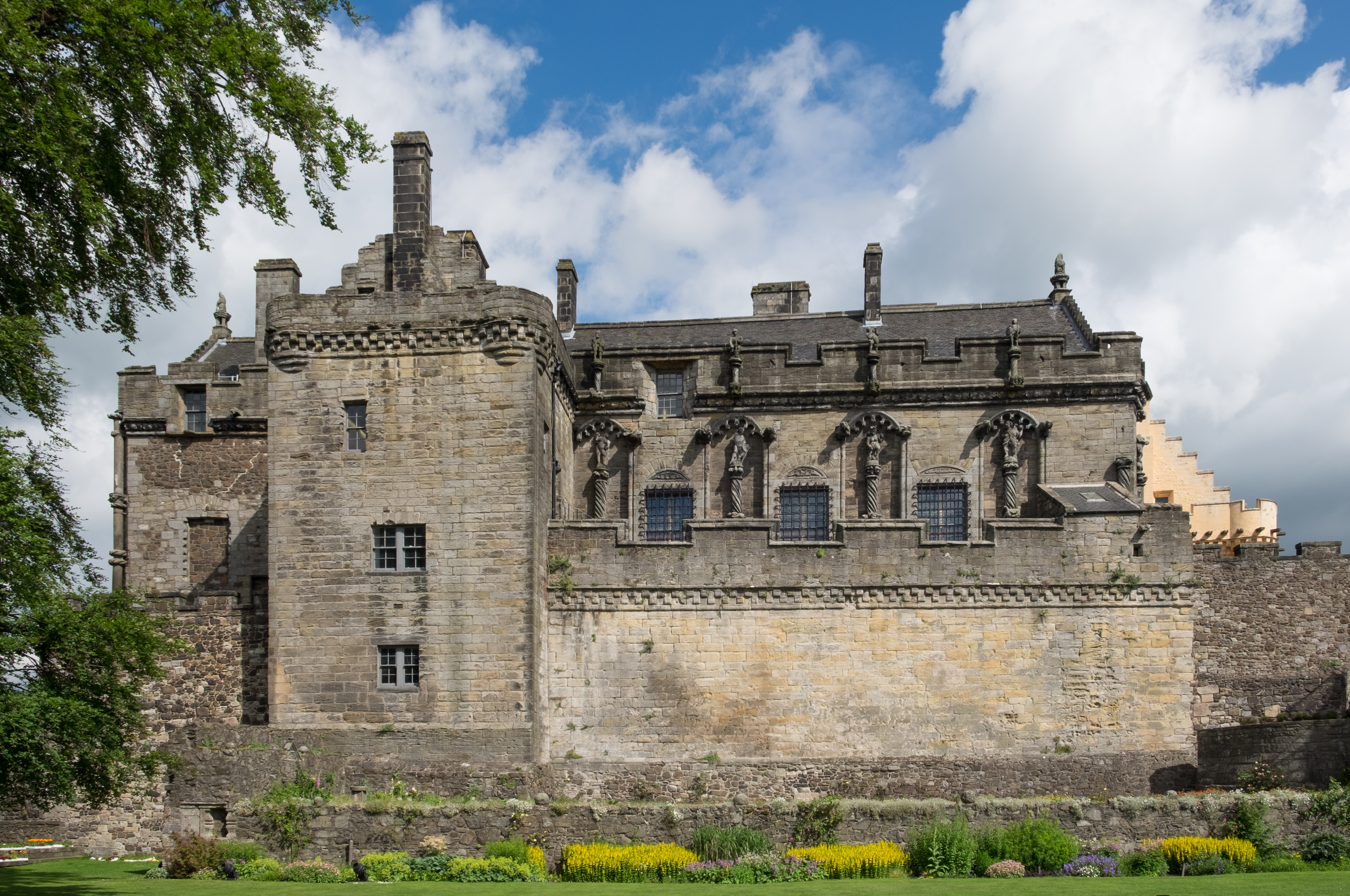
Annabell Murray and her son the Earl of Mar were made keepers of Prince Henry at Stirling Castle

In 1594, Murray became the keeper of King James's son Prince Henry at Stirling Castle. Prince Henry was born at Stirling, and Anne of Denmark had been attended by the doctors Martin Schöner and Gilbert Moncreiff, the surgeon Gilbert Primrose, the apothecary Alexander Barclay, and a midwife. Other members of the Murray family joined this new household, including her sisters Catherine Murray, Lady Abercairny and Margaret Murray, Lady Clackmannan as dames of honour, Barbara Murray keeper of linen, William Murray a varlet, Patrick Murray of Geanis master of the wardrobe and his assistant John Murray, and Henry Murray as master of the spice house. The Prince's nurse was Margaret Masterton, wife of James Primrose. At Henry's baptism on 30 August 1594, Annabell's formal role included lifting the prince out of his bed and passing him to the Duke of Lennox, who then handed him to the English ambassador, and she held him again in the chapel until the service began.

There was some trouble with the prince's wet nurse in December 1594. She was ill and became "dry" and concealed this for a few days. A new nurse, the wife of Henry Murray in Stirling, was appointed. The previous nurse was forgiven by the king but the Countess of Mar was criticised by some because she had chosen her.

Other key members of Prince Henry's household at Stirling were the seamstress Elizabeth Crummy or Abercromby and the laundress Elizabeth Moncrieff who was supplied with soap and laundry starch called "stiffing".

Anna of Denmark resented her son's absence and her attempts to gain custody of Henry involved Annabell and her son John Erskine, Earl of Mar (1558–1634) in bitter factional struggles. When Anne of Denmark planned to visit her son in April 1595, "Old Lady Mar" was asked to leave Stirling Castle.

== Old Age ==
In July 1599 the King made a gift to the Countess and her son for their loyal services. The award noted her great age and "hir body waist and extenuat by hir former service". If she died the gift would be given to her daughter Marie Erskine (the former wife of Archibald Douglas, 8th Earl of Angus). Marie Erskine helped looked after the prince at Stirling.

In 1600 James VI in Parliament granted her a property in Stirling called the "heuch and brae of Parkhill" or the "Haining", and a formal discharge for service in keeping Prince Henry in the same terms.

Annabell Murray died in February 1603. According to Archibald Simpson, minister of Dalkeith, she "peacefully ended her days, respected by all, hated by none." On 7 May 1603, her daughter-in-law Marie Stewart, Countess of Mar frustrated the attempt of Anne of Denmark to take Prince Henry from the castle.

Her other homes were Mar's Wark and Alloa Tower, and a townhouse in Edinburgh. The National Museum of Scotland has a chair, a caquetoire, carved with her initials and three stars from the Murray heraldry, and a cradle said to have been for the infant king or prince. The chair could have been made in the 1590s rather than the 1570s.

Annabell made more than one will or list of legacies. In the will made on 1 November 1601 she noted her farmstock on the mains of Erskine and on the land of Glen Shee with Auchlansky and the park of Jarago. She wanted to be buried at the new burial aisle at the kirk of Alloa, as her husband had been. The bodies of Erskine predecessors should be brought from Cambuskenneth Abbey to Alloa, as her husband had wished in his will.

Alexander Yule, a schoolmaster in Stirling, published the commendatory Illustrissimae Dominae ... Annabellae Murraviae vitae et mortis Speculum (Edinburgh: Robert Charteris, 1603).

=== Jewels and physic ===
In her will made on 16 November 1602 she left her jewellery to her family, including a gold locket depicting the story of Abraham and Isaac. Another locket or tablet included an agate in an enamelled setting with four tabled diamonds and a knot of pearls. In the original Scots this was "ane taiblet with the piktur of ane agget with reid, green, and quhyt, with four tablle diamontis and ane knop of sevin perllis".

A third locket depicted an allegory of an unyielding adamant (a hard stone) beaten "but in vain" by two hammers. Annabell explained the device in terms of loyalty to religion, monarch, and family: "like as the pressing hammers cannot break the adamant no man [should] he suffer his obliged affection and duty to his god, his prince, & parent to be battered or overcome, and that for no fear, pleasure, profit, or preferment that is able to provoke him thereto".

Expensive clothes included a cloak called a "mandell" decorated with rubies, diamonds, and "pictures". New gold or silver bracelets or signet rings engraved with the cipher of her name, her initials, were made for some male dependants including James Murray of Polmaise She had made physic with a servant Jonet Patersoune, and bequeathed her both medicine and distilling equipment; "the whole drugs extant in my possession the time of decease together with my whole stillatours, glasses, leam pots, and other furniture pertaining thereto". The will was dictated to her clerk and she signed each page, it is now held by the National Library of Scotland.
