= Kincardine Castle, Auchterarder =

Country house in Perth and Kinross, Scotland

Kincardine Castle is a 19th-century manor house near Auchterarder in Perth and Kinross, Scotland. The building lies 1.5 kilometres (0.93 mi) south-west of the town, on the Ruthven Water. The Gothic house was constructed in 1801–1803, and is a category B listed building.

The remains of an earlier 14th century keep, also named Kincardine Castle, are located nearby (56°16′46″N 3°42′06″W). The ruined keep was demolished in 1645. Little remains today beyond its rectangular foundations.
