= John Graham, 4th Earl of Montrose =

Scottish nobleman (1573–1626)

The Right Honourable John Graham
- Earl of Montrose
- Tenure: 1608–1626
- Predecessor: John Graham, 3rd Earl of Montrose
- Successor: James Graham, 5th Earl of Montrose
- Born: 1573
- Died: 1626 (aged 52–53)
- Spouse: Margaret Ruthven
- Issue: James Graham, 1st Marquess of Montrose; Lady Lilias Graham; Lady Elizabeth Graham; Lady Margaret Graham; Lady Dorothea Graham; Lady Katherine Graham; Lady Beatrix Graham

John Graham, 4th Earl of Montrose (1573–1626) was a Scottish nobleman, Earl of Montrose from 1608 to the 1620s. He was for a time Lord President of the Privy Council of Scotland.

He was a Catholic, as the English ambassador William Asheby noted in November 1589, on the death of his uncle Mungo Graham, Master Household to James VI.

On 31 January 1595, in a feud following the death of his kinsman John Graham of Hallyards, he fought with James Sandilands on the Royal Mile. There were over 100 pistol shots and Sandilands was wounded. In the confusion, a rumour spread that King James was besieged in Holyrood Palace. Sandilands' brother-in-law William Crauford, brother of the laird of Carse was killed.

He was at court in Royston in England in 1614 and the court physician Théodore de Mayerne treated him for melancholy. Mayerne offered to write a recipe to treat his wife's eyes in 1616.

== Marriage and Family ==
He married Margaret Ruthven, daughter of William Ruthven, 1st Earl of Gowrie and Dorothea Stewart. Their children included:

- James Graham, 5th Earl of Montrose, later 1st Marquess of Montrose.
- Lilias Graham, married Sir John Colquhoun of Luss, 1st Baronet.
- Elizabeth Graham
- Margaret Graham married Archibald Napier, 1st Lord Napier of Merchiston
- Dorothea Graham married Sir James Rollo, Younger of Duncrub.
- Katherine Graham
- Beatrix Graham married David Drummond, 3rd Lord Maderty.

Peerage of Scotland
Preceded by John Graham	Earl of Montrose; 1608–1626	Succeeded by James Graham
