= Patrick Murray (courtier) =

Scottish courtier

Patrick Murray was a Scottish courtier. He was a son of Andrew Murray of Balvaird and Janet Graham, a daughter of William Graham, 2nd Earl of Montrose. His brother was David Murray, 1st Viscount of Stormont.

== Career ==
He was a gentleman of chamber to James VI of Scotland from 1591 to 1596. He acquired the lands of Binn and Geanis or Ganys near Inverness.

James VI gave Patrick Murray 20 gold crowns on 3 February 1589 to fund a visit to the Earl of Huntly in the north of Scotland.

In October 1593, James VI went to stay for a few days at Thirlestane Castle at Lauder, the home of the Chancellor of Scotland, John Maitland. The English ambassador heard that he had gone from there to Perth, to meet the excommunicated earls. Roger Aston told him this was not true, and it seems that Bowes had been misled by Patrick Murray. Bowes wrote that "Paty Murray" was the agent of the excommunicated earls. He was called to serve as a gentleman of the king's chamber in November.

On 13 August 1596, according to a chronicle, Murray organised a reconciliation at Falkland Palace between the Earls of Huntly of Angus and James VI.

He brought the king's instructions to the Presbytery of Aberdeen in January 1597. In May 1597 he was sent to the north of Scotland by James VI to settle various matters relating to the Kirk of Scotland, and the Catholic faith professed by Henrietta Stewart, Countess of Huntly. Murray was frequently sent by the king to the Earl of Huntly.

== Personal life ==
The dates of his birth and death are unknown.
