= Balthayock Castle =

- United Kingdom
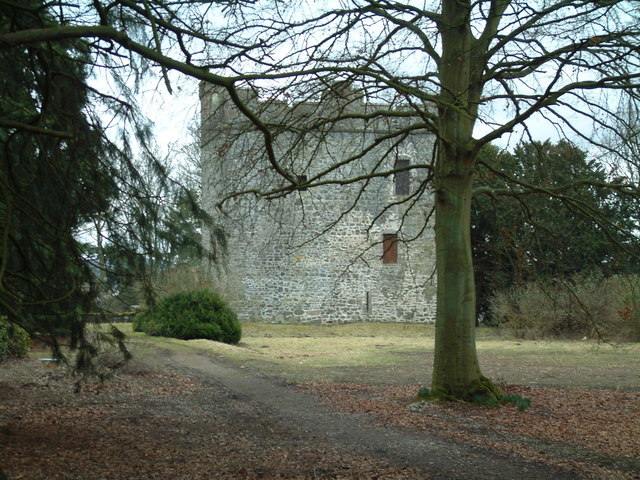
- Balthayock Castle

Site information
- Condition: Good

Location
- Coordinates: 56.3916°N 3.3394°W

Site history
- Built: late-14th century
- Materials: Rubble and sandstone

Balthayock Castle, also known as Tower of Balthayock, is a medieval tower house located 3 miles east of Perth, Scotland. It was built in late 14th century. It is measured at 52 by 37 ft and has very thick walls. The Balthayock castle is said to have been owned by family of Blair since the time of William I (1165-1214). It was very ruinous prior to 1870. James Maclaren saved the tower by building the present battlements, modern roof, cap-house, forestair to the entrance and also altered the interior. It was inhabited until the middle of the last century. It is now unoccupied but is in good condition.

In September 1594 James VI raised a force against the northern earls and met them at the battle of Glenlivet. When he was at Perth, Euphemia Douglas, the wife of the Master of Glamis wrote to Alexander Blair, laird of Balthayock asking him to come with Glamis Castle with his followers, armed and ready to follow the king to the north. In 1599 the young laird of Balthayock and Lawrence Blair with William Row, kirk minister at Kinnoull, were captured at Kinross by the Lord Sanquhar and imprisoned for two weeks.

== Architecture ==
The walls of castle are almost 10 ft thick and are made of sandstone and whin rubble. On the castle's east side an armorial panel displaying the date 1370 is present on the side of the stone stair. Another armorial with the initials AB (Blair) GM dated 1578 is located at the castle's southeast corner over an archway. Tusking in the building indicates the presence of a barmkin. The main block of the castle consists of three storeys, an attic and a wing of two storeys; the first floor of the wing is divided into a chamber and hall. It was remodelled in 1870 with the addition of a forestair, crenellated parapet and cap-house. It is now uninhibited but it is in considerably good condition.

== See also ==
- Ardstinchar Castle
