= Kincardine, Aberdeenshire =

Former burgh in Aberdeenshire, Scotland

Coordinates: 56.8654°N 2.5435°W

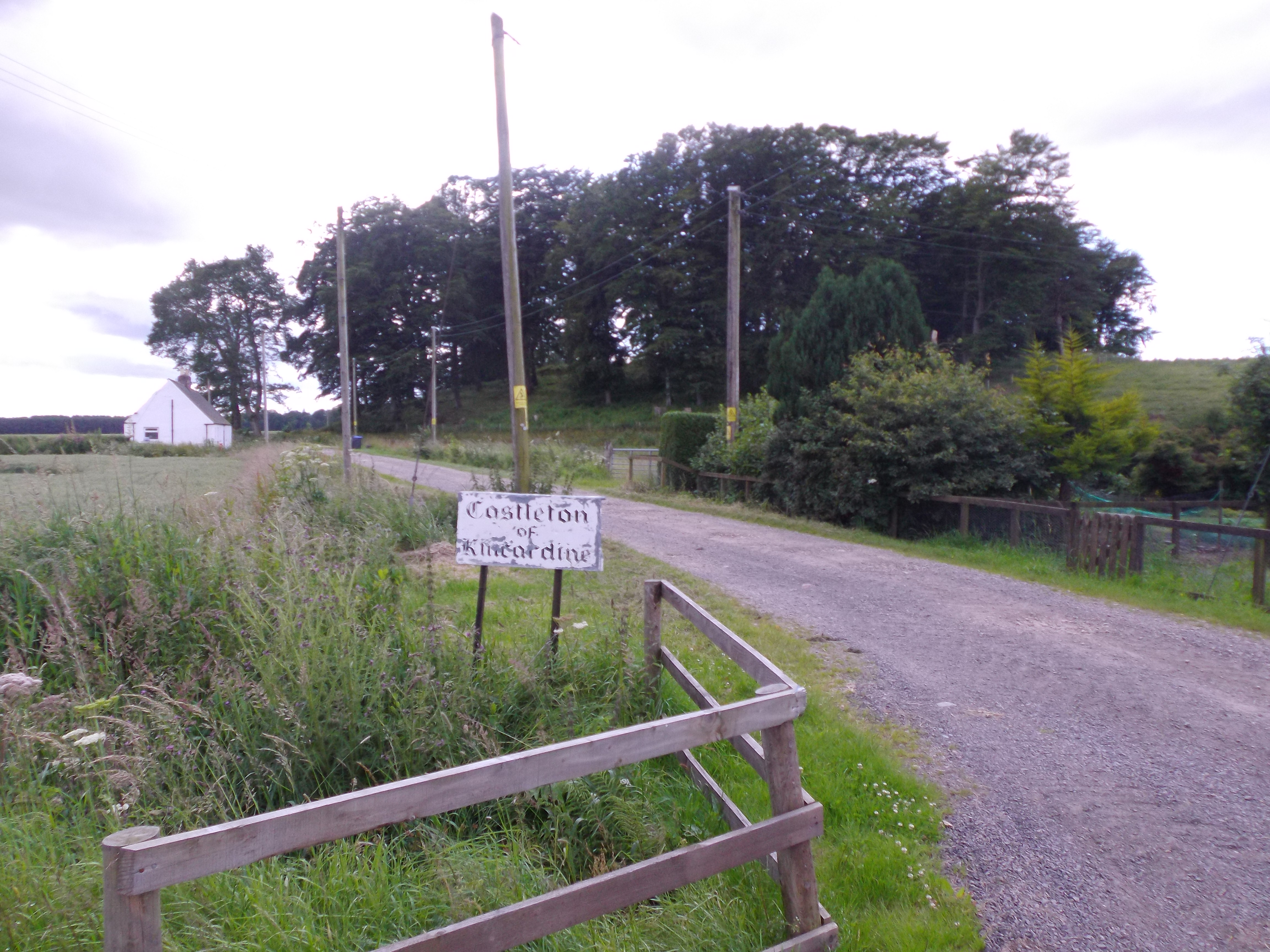
The site of Kincardine Castle

Kincardine was a burgh in Scotland, near the present-day village of Fettercairn. It gave its name to and served as the first county town of Kincardineshire.

The settlement gradually developed around Kincardine Castle. The origin of the castle is not known, although it has been popularly identified as the place of death of Kenneth II. The Carnegies were made stewards of the castle during the reign of William the Lion. In 1296, it was the location where John Balliol confessed to rebellion against Edward I of England. It was kept in good repair over the following centuries. Mary, Queen of Scots, visited in November 1562 as she returned from her northern progress.

By 1532, the castle was a secondary residence of William Keith, 4th Earl Marischal, and appears to have been at the centre of the small town, occupying about two hundred yards between gates on the main road. The Earl petitioned for Kincardine to be declared as a free burgh and county town for the Mearns. The petition claimed that the sheriff courts for the Mearns were already being held in the town, and that it was reputed to have previously been made a free burgh, but that the charter had been lost. He was successful, and on 27 January 1531/2, Kincardine became the county town of the newly created county of Kincardineshire.

By 1600, the burgh was in decline, and the sheriff and his deputes complained to the king that the accommodation for them was unsuitable, no tolbooth having been constructed; they were successful in having the county town moved to Stonehaven.

Without county town status, Kincardine quickly dwindled, and the castle fell into ruin. By the 1830s, it was described as a "mere hamlet" and it was noted that "only the foundations of the [castle] walls can be traced", and by 1870 there were no surviving houses. The castle foundations survive today, forming a scheduled monument. The cemetery of the former St Catherine of Siena Chapel also survives, with part of its wall and an 18th-century gravestone.
