= Tullibardine Castle =

Former Scottish castle

- Tullibardine, Perth and Kinross, Scotland

Location
- Tullibardine Castle
- Location within Perth and Kinross
- Coordinates: 56.305079°N 3.763489°W

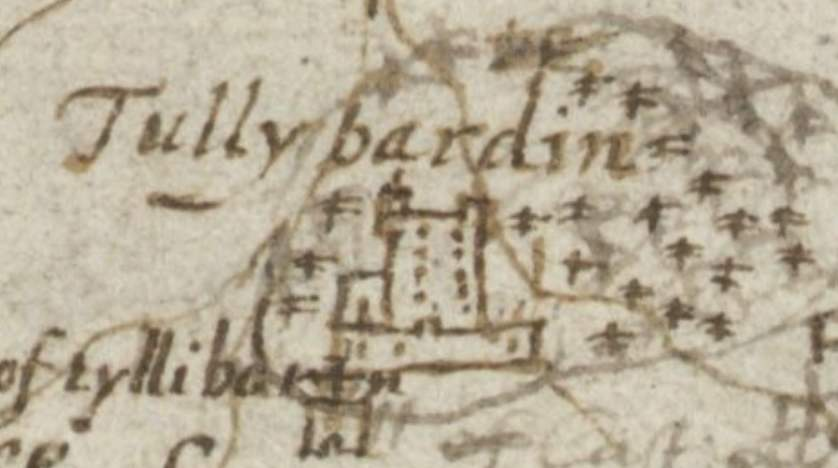
Map of Tullibardine Castle

Tullibardine Castle was a castle located in the village of Tullibardine, 2 miles (3.2 km) north of Auchterarder in Perth and Kinross, Scotland.

== History ==
The lands of Tullibardine passed to the Murray family after Ada de Strathearn, the wife of William Murray, was granted the other moiety of Tullibardine from her aunty. The castle was built in the late 13th to early 14th century, with likely its first custodian being David Murray, Baron of Tullibardine.

One early Murray owner of the castle was said to have had seventeen sons. The king thought he had broken the law by having an armed retinue. The brothers were said to have slept in a large round room in the castle, their heads placed against a central pillar.

The outline of the ship, the Great Michael, commissioned by James IV, was commemorated by a plantation of hawthorn hedges at Tullibardine. This could be seen in the 1570s, according to a chronicle writer, Robert Lindsay of Pitscottie. The probable site of this garden feature can be seen in aerial photographs about 100 metres north of the castle site.

Mary, Queen of Scots, visited William Murray of Tullibardine at the castle on 16 November 1562, and following the baptism of Prince James, on 31 December 1566 accompanied, it was said, by the Earl of Bothwell. The indictment or "Book of Articles" written by her enemies in 1568 says, in the Scots language, "at Tullibardin (and at Drymen, Drummond Castle) sche abaid the spece of aucht dayis using that fylthines almoist without cloik or respect of schame or honestie".

Letters of Annabell Murray, Countess of Mar and William Stewart of Grandtully suggest a meeting at Tullibardine Castle on 28 July 1570 was an attempt at reconciliation during the Marian Civil War. Regent Morton came to Tullibardine in September 1575.

== James VI and The Masque at Tullibardine ==
Scottish royal account for masque costume

James VI often visited John Murray, 1st Earl of Tullibardine, whose roles at court included Master of the Household. He made plans to visit Tullibardine on 23 May 1580 as part of his first progress in Scotland.

King James was entertained at Tullibardine by a piper and a man playing the swasche, a kind of drum, in July 1582. James came from Huntingtower Castle, then known as Ruthven Castle in August 1584, when there was a plague scare in Perth.

King James, possibly with Anne of Denmark, attended the wedding of Lilias Murray and John Grant of Freuchie on 21 June 1591 at Tullibardine. James VI, who had taken dancing lessons in 1580, performed in a masque, dancing with his valet, probably John Wemyss of Logie. They wore Venetian carnival masks and helmets with red and pink taffeta costumes. The original account of fabrics supplied to the king's tailor, written in the Scots language, includes:

Item, the 18 of June deliverit to Allexander Miller 8 ellis of incarnedin Spainze (Spanish) taffetye to be ane stand of maskerie clayths to his majestie att the mariage of the laird of Tillebarne dochter att £7 the elle, £56.
Item, 8 elles of incarnet taffetie to be ane stand of maskerye clayths to hym that wes his majesties vallet att thatt tyme, £24.
Item, 2 wenyss maskis, the ane to his majestie, the uthir to his vallet, £6.

A "Venice mask" was a kind of vizard possibly made using an Italian technique. The costumes of the King and the valet were embellished with gold "tock", a tinsel fabric, and lined with yellow canvas. A horse caparison made by Robert Abercromby was a prop for the masque,

Although some contemporaries, Albert Fontenay and later Théodore de Mayerne, wrote that James was disinclined or unable to dance, he had been given dance lessons throughout his childhood and was able to perform in the masque in some role. James VI returned from Tullibardine after hearing that his rebellious kinsman, Francis Stewart, 5th Earl of Bothwell, had escaped from Edinburgh Castle.

James VI was at Tullibardine again for New Year in 1592. He stayed again on 7 January 1594, and spent the first week of January 1598 at the castle.

The castle was demolished in 1883.

== See also ==
- Tullibardine Chapel
