= Old Kincardine Castle, Auchterarder =

Castle in Perth and Kinross, Scotland

Old Kincardine Castle

Site information
- Condition: ruined

Location
- Coordinates: 56.279444°N 3.701667°W

Site history
- Built: 13th century
- Demolished: 1645

Old Kincardine Castle was a 13th-century castle near Auchterarder in Perth and Kinross, Scotland. The castle was located on a promontory overlooking the glen.

== History ==
Sir David de Graham of Cardross received the lands of Kincardine from the Earl of Strathearn and started construction of the castle shortly afterwards. It was formed of a quadrangle, with walls 15 feet (4.6 m) thick, surrounded by a dry ditch on three sides and a fortified main gate and drawbridge.

King Edward I stayed at Auchterarder during the First War of Scottish Independence in 1296. Queen Mary of Scotland stayed at Kincardine on a journey during 1562. Regent Morton visited the castle in September 1575. In 1579, John Stewart, 4th Earl of Atholl, Chancellor of Scotland, stayed at Kincardine on his way from Stirling, whereupon he suddenly took ill and died at the castle. Claims that he was poisoned were not substantiated.

The castle held out for ten days under artillery fire from the forces of John Middleton, during the Wars of the Three Kingdoms, until the well failed, forcing the garrison to surrender. John Graham, 4th Earl of Montrose, died at the castle in 1626, and was buried nearby at the Church of Aberuthven. The castle was dismantled by the Archibald Campbell, 1st Marquess of Argyll in 1645. Only small fragments remain, primarily a gable wall, 27 feet (8.3 m) long and 23 feet (7 m) high. In 1660, its stones were used to build a new local church in Auchterarder, the tower of which still remains. The new Kincardine Castle was built nearby in the 19th century by James Johnston, in the Gothic style of architecture.
