= Aberfeldy Town Hall =

Municipal Building in Aberfeldy, Scotland

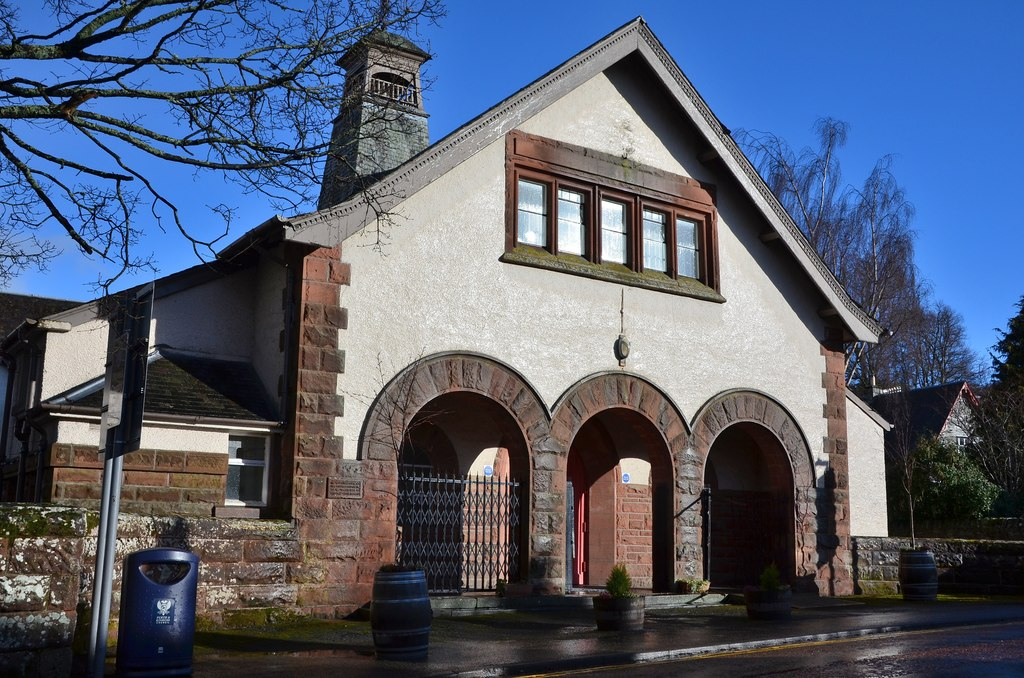
- The building in 2015

- Shown in Perth and Kinross Aberfeldy Town Hall (Scotland)
- 56.618383°N 3.867435°W
- Location: Crieff Road, Aberfeldy, Perth and Kinross

History
- Built: 1891 (135 years ago)

Site notes
- Architect: James MacLaren
- Architectural style: Free style

Listed Building – Category B
- Official name: Crieff Road, Aberfeldy Town Hall Including Boundary Walls
- Designated: 5 October 1971
- Reference no.: LB20839

Aberfeldy Town Hall is a municipal building on Crieff Road in Aberfeldy, Perth and Kinross, Scotland. The structure, which is used as an events venue, is Category B listed.

== History ==
Following significant population growth, largely associated with the tourism industry, the area became a police burgh in 1887. In this context, the new police commissioners decided to procure a town hall: the site they selected was the former site of the Black House, the original home of the Menzies of Weem, who arrived from Nithsdale around the 14th century. The site was donated to the town by Gavin Campbell, 1st Marquess of Breadalbane in 1887.

The foundation stone for the new building was laid by the local member of parliament, Sir Donald Currie, on 21 September 1889. It was designed in free style by James MacLaren, a London-based architect who was born in Callander; it was built in brick with a harled finish and was officially opened on 5 December 1891. The structure incorporated elements of the old Breadalbane Academy, built circa 1840, at the rear. The design involved a symmetrical main frontage with three bays facing onto Crieff Road; there was a loggia with red brick voussoirs and wrought iron gates on the ground floor and a five-part window on the first floor set into a stone panel and surrounded by a large gable. At roof level there was a large turret. Internally, the principal rooms were the main hall and the lesser hall.

The design was influenced by the American architect Henry Hobson Richardson: the architectural commentator, Nick Haynes, described it as an "exceptionally avant-garde piece of Free Style" although he regarded the turret as "oversized". The building was used as an events venue from an early stage and highlights included the premiere of The Provost's Chain by the playwright, Andrew P. Wilson, on 24 August 1931.

The building continued to serve as the meeting place of the burgh council for much of the 20th century but ceased to be the local seat of government when the enlarged Perth and Kinross District Council was formed in 1975. In 2014, Locus Breadalbane, a community organisation formed to manage the Locus Centre in Aberfeldy, acquired the town hall from Perth and Kinross Council. At the same time, the author J. K. Rowling, who lives at Killiechassie, made a sizeable donation to a fund to convert the town hall into a music and drama venue.

== See also ==
- List of listed buildings in Aberfeldy, Perth and Kinross
