= List of listed buildings in Aberfeldy, Perth and Kinross =

This is a list of listed buildings in the parish of Aberfeldy in Perth and Kinross, Scotland.

== List ==
Name	Location	Date Listed	Grid Ref. (Note: Sometimes known as OSGB36, the grid reference (where provided) is based on the British national grid reference system used by the Ordnance Survey. • "Guide to National Grid". Ordnance Survey. • "Get-a-map". Ordnance Survey.)	Geo-coordinates	Notes	LB Number (Note: Historic Environment Scotland assign a unique alphanumeric identifier to each designated site in Scotland, for listed buildings this always begins with "LB", for example "LB12345".)	Image
Crieff Road, Church Of Scotland Parish Church Including Boundary Walls				56°37′03″N 3°52′05″W	Category C(S)	20837	Upload Photo
13 Kenmore Street				56°37′08″N 3°52′09″W	Category C(S)	20843	Upload Photo
15 - 19 (Odd Nos) And 19A Kenmore Street				56°37′07″N 3°52′10″W	Category B	20844	Upload Photo
21, 23 And 25 Kenmore Street With Fonesca Cottage				56°37′07″N 3°52′11″W	Category C(S)	20845	Upload Photo
35 - 41 (Odd Nos) Kenmore Street				56°37′07″N 3°52′14″W	Category C(S)	20846	Upload Photo
43, 43A And 45 Kenmore Street With Ivy Cottage				56°37′06″N 3°52′16″W	Category B	20847	Upload Photo
38 - 44 (Even Nos) Kenmore Street Including Ancillary Building				56°37′07″N 3°52′14″W	Category C(S)	20853	Upload Photo
8 The Square, Royal Bank Of Scotland				56°37′10″N 3°51′56″W	Category B	20857	Upload Photo
22 The Square, Co-Op Buildings And 6 Dunkeld Street				56°37′10″N 3°51′52″W	Category C(S)	20858	Upload Photo
Home Street, Our Lady Of Mercy (Roman Catholic) Church Including Boundary Walls, Gate And Railings				56°37′17″N 3°51′49″W	Category B	48853	Upload Photo
Taybridge Road, Rose Cottage Including Ancillary Building, Boundary Walls And Gatepiers				56°37′12″N 3°52′09″W	Category C(S)	48862	Upload Photo
12 - 16 (Even Nos) Kenmore Street				56°37′08″N 3°52′11″W	Category C(S)	20850	Upload Photo
46 - 50 (Even Nos) Kenmore Street Including Ancillary Building				56°37′07″N 3°52′16″W	Category C(S)	20854	Upload Photo
1 Bank Street, Bank House And Bank Building Including Boundary Walls, Gates And Railings				56°37′08″N 3°52′00″W	Category B	20855	Upload Photo
Bridgend, Highland Gift Shop Including Boundary Walls And Railings				56°37′08″N 3°51′56″W	Category C(S)	48841	Upload Photo
Dunkeld Road, Aberfeldy Distillery And Dewar's World Of Whisky Including Stalk And Ancillary Buildings				56°37′28″N 3°50′59″W	Category B	48846	Upload another image
The Square (Off), Former Congregational Church				56°37′11″N 3°51′56″W	Category C(S)	48870	Upload another image
Crieff Road, Ivybank, Rosemount And Moncrieff Surveyors Including Boundary Walls And Gatepiers				56°37′08″N 3°52′07″W	Category B	20840	Upload Photo
Kenmore Street, Armoury Toll House Including Boundary Walls				56°37′06″N 3°52′18″W	Category B	20848	Upload Photo
4- 8 (Even Nos) Kenmore Street				56°37′09″N 3°52′09″W	Category C(S)	20849	Upload Photo
30 - 36 (Even Nos) Kenmore Street				56°37′08″N 3°52′13″W	Category C(S)	20852	Upload Photo
1 Old Crieff Road And 5 Tomchulan Court Including Terrace And Railings				56°37′10″N 3°51′51″W	Category B	20856	Upload Photo
Taybridge Drive, Black Watch Monument				56°37′15″N 3°52′23″W	Category B	20862	Upload another image
45 Dunkeld Street, Viewfield				56°37′14″N 3°51′45″W	Category B	20863	Upload Photo
1- 6 (Inclusive Nos) Breadalbane Terrace Including Boundary Wall				56°37′16″N 3°51′42″W	Category C(S)	48839	Upload Photo
Bridgend, War Memorial				56°37′08″N 3°51′56″W	Category C(S)	48842	Upload Photo
5 - 9 (Odd Nos) Chapel Street				56°37′11″N 3°51′55″W	Category C(S)	48843	Upload Photo
Old Crieff Road, Aberfeldy Cottage Hospital Including Boundary Walls And Gatepiers				56°37′06″N 3°51′28″W	Category C(S)	48860	Upload Photo
21 The Square, Hobart House, Co-Op Building And 10 Tomchulan Court				56°37′10″N 3°51′52″W	Category C(S)	48869	Upload Photo
Crieff Road, Bridge Over Moness Burn				56°36′58″N 3°51′59″W	Category B	20841	Upload Photo
22 - 26 (Even Nos) Kenmore Street				56°37′08″N 3°52′12″W	Category C(S)	20851	Upload Photo
Taybridge Road, Church Hall And Tower Including Boundary Walls				56°37′10″N 3°52′06″W	Category C(S)	20860	Upload Photo
17, 19, 21, 21A And Post Office, Dunkeld Street				56°37′12″N 3°51′51″W	Category C(S)	48847	Upload Photo
Home Street, Prospect House Including Boundary Walls And Gate				56°37′14″N 3°51′45″W	Category C(S)	48852	Upload Photo
Taybridge Terrace, Tweed Mill Including Boundary Walls				56°37′18″N 3°52′04″W	Category B	48865	Upload Photo
The Square And Old Crieff Road, Bank Of Scotland, Struan House And Tulloch Bank Including Boundary Walls, Gatepiers, Gates And Railings				56°37′09″N 3°51′52″W	Category B	48871	Upload Photo
The Square, Water Fountain				56°37′09″N 3°51′54″W	Category C(S)	48872	Upload Photo
Urlar Road, Torr Hill Including Gatepiers, Gates And Boundary Walls				56°36′52″N 3°52′05″W	Category B	48873	Upload Photo
Mill Street, Aberfeldy Water Mill				56°37′10″N 3°52′02″W	Category A	20859	Upload another image See more images
Wade's Bridge				56°37′17″N 3°52′25″W	Category A	20861	Upload another image See more images
Alma Avenue, Dun Aluinn Including Terrace Walls				56°36′55″N 3°52′34″W	Category C(S)	48835	Upload Photo
2- 6 (Even Nos) Bank Street				56°37′09″N 3°51′59″W	Category B	48837	Upload Photo
Bank Street, Library And Area Office With Crieff Road, Municipal Buildings Including Ancillary Building, Boundary Walls And Gatepiers				56°37′08″N 3°52′05″W	Category B	48838	Upload Photo
Chapel Street, Former Free Church Including Boundary Walls And Gates				56°37′13″N 3°51′53″W	Category B	48844	Upload another image
Dunkeld Street, Station Hotel				56°37′14″N 3°51′46″W	Category C(S)	48851	Upload Photo
1 And 2 The Square				56°37′11″N 3°51′54″W	Category C(S)	48867	Upload Photo
3 - 7 (Inclusive Nos) The Square				56°37′11″N 3°51′55″W	Category C(S)	48868	Upload Photo
Crieff Road, Aberfeldy Town Hall Including Boundary Walls				56°37′06″N 3°52′03″W	Category B	20839	Upload another image
18 - 24 (Even Nos) Dunkeld Street				56°37′12″N 3°51′49″W	Category C(S)	48849	Upload Photo
32 Dunkeld Street, Alexandra House, Including Boundary Walls				56°37′12″N 3°51′48″W	Category B	48850	Upload Photo
Kenmore Street, Dunolly Including Cottage, Boundary Walls, Gatepiers, Railings And Gates				56°37′05″N 3°52′28″W	Category C(S)	48859	Upload Photo
Taybridge Terrace, Strawberry Bank				56°37′15″N 3°52′06″W	Category C(S)	48863	Upload Photo
Taybridge Terrace, Victoria Park, Pavilion				56°37′20″N 3°52′06″W	Category C(S)	48866	Upload Photo
Crieff Road, Dean House Including Boundary Walls				56°37′04″N 3°52′02″W	Category C(S)	20838	Upload Photo
Crieff Road, Moness Country Club, Moness House				56°36′58″N 3°51′47″W	Category B	20842	Upload Photo
Appin Place, Workshop				56°37′13″N 3°51′54″W	Category C(S)	48836	Upload Photo
39 Dunkeld Street, Breadalbane Bakery				56°37′13″N 3°51′47″W	Category C(S)	48848	Upload Photo
Breadalbane Terrace, Palace Hotel Including Ancillary Building And Boundary Walls				56°37′15″N 3°51′43″W	Category B	48840	Upload Photo
Crieff Road, Breadalbane Academy Including Ancillary Buildings				56°37′03″N 3°52′14″W	Category C(S)	48845	Upload Photo
Kenmore Street, Dundarach Including Boundary Walls And Gates				56°37′05″N 3°52′21″W	Category C(S)	48858	Upload Photo
Taybridge Drive, Dunvarlich Including Boundary Walls				56°37′10″N 3°52′23″W	Category B	48861	Upload Photo
Taybridge Terrace, Mill House				56°37′17″N 3°52′04″W	Category C(S)	48864	Upload Photo

== Key ==
The scheme for classifying buildings in Scotland is:

- Category A: "buildings of national or international importance, either architectural or historic; or fine, little-altered examples of some particular period, style or building type."
- Category B: "buildings of regional or more than local importance; or major examples of some particular period, style or building type, which may have been altered."
- Category C: "buildings of local importance; lesser examples of any period, style, or building type, as originally constructed or moderately altered; and simple traditional buildings which group well with other listed buildings."

In March 2016 there were 47,288 listed buildings in Scotland. Of these, 8% were Category A, and 50% were Category B, with the remaining 42% being Category C.
