= Menzies baronets =

Extinct baronetcy in the Baronetage of Nova Scotia

The Menzies Baronetcy, of Castle Menzies in the County of Perth, was a title in the Baronetage of Nova Scotia. It was created on 2 September 1665 for Alexander Menzies. The title became extinct on the death of the eighth Baronet in 1910. It was unsuccessfully claimed between 1914 and 1917 by David Prentice Menzies, of Plean Castle, Stirlingshire, who claimed to be the nearest lawful heir male of line of Captain James Menzies.

== Menzies baronets, of Castle Menzies (1665) ==
- Sir Alexander Menzies, 1st Baronet (died 1695)
- Sir Alexander Menzies, 2nd Baronet (died c. 1730)
- Sir Robert Menzies, 3rd Baronet (died 1786)
- Sir John Menzies, 4th Baronet (died 1800)
- Sir Robert Menzies, 5th Baronet (died 1813)
- Sir Neil Menzies, 6th Baronet (1780–1844)
- Sir Robert Menzies, 7th Baronet (1817–1903)
- Sir Neil James Menzies, 8th Baronet (1855–1910)

== Portrait gallery ==
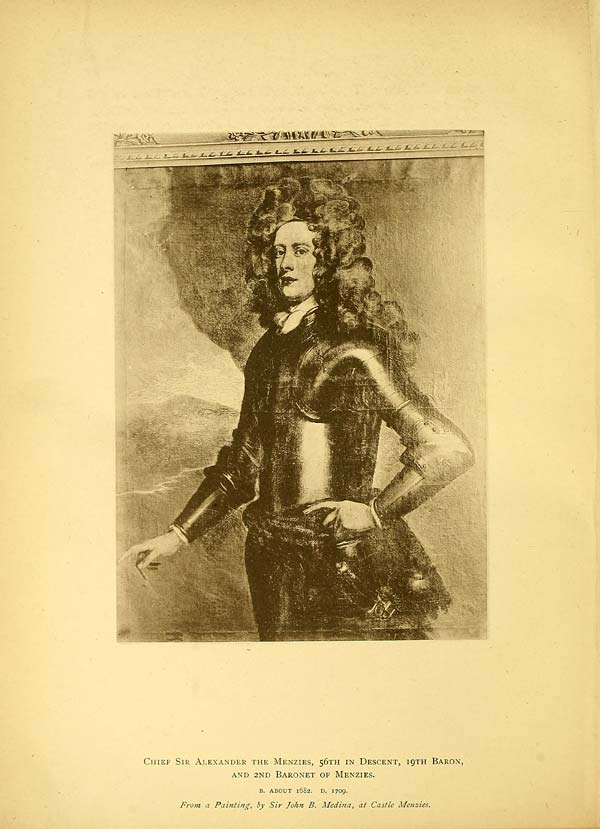
Sir Alexander Menzies, 2nd Baronet

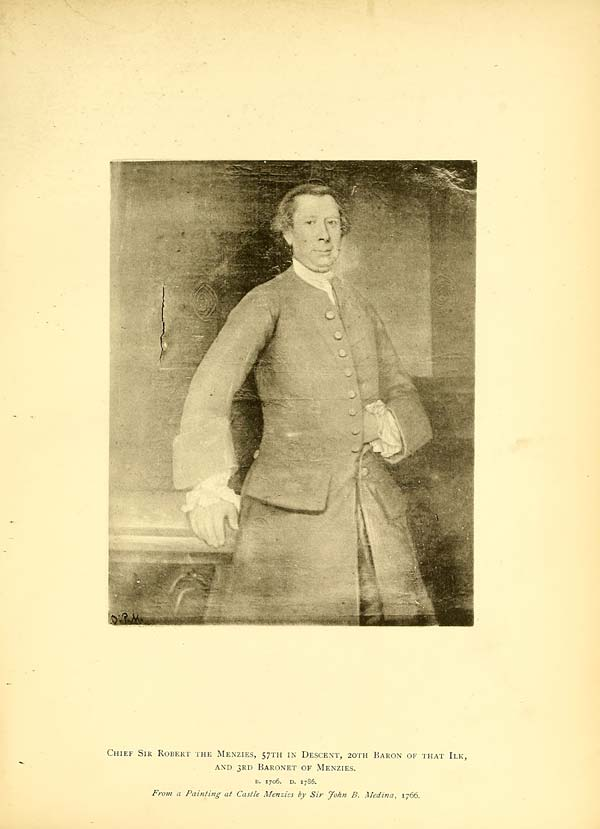
Sir Robert Menzies, 3rd Baronet

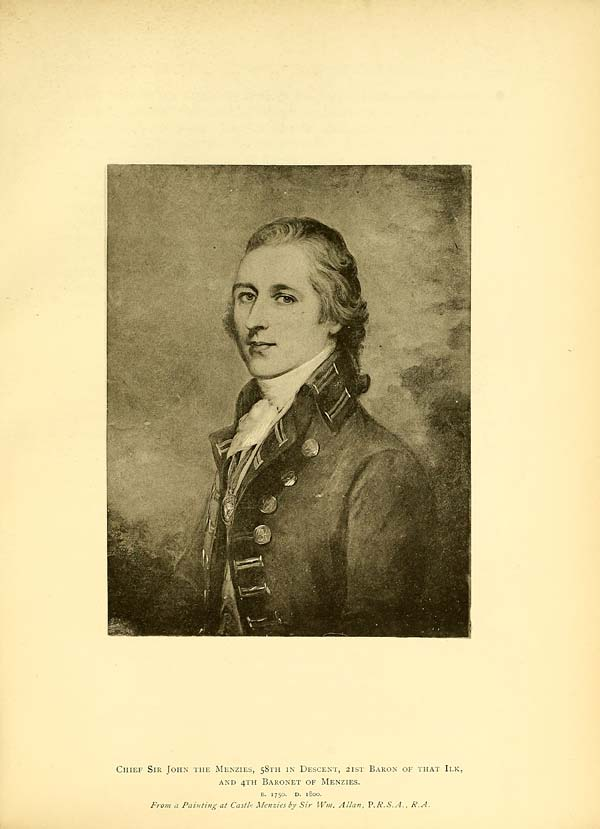
Sir John Menzies, 4th Baronet

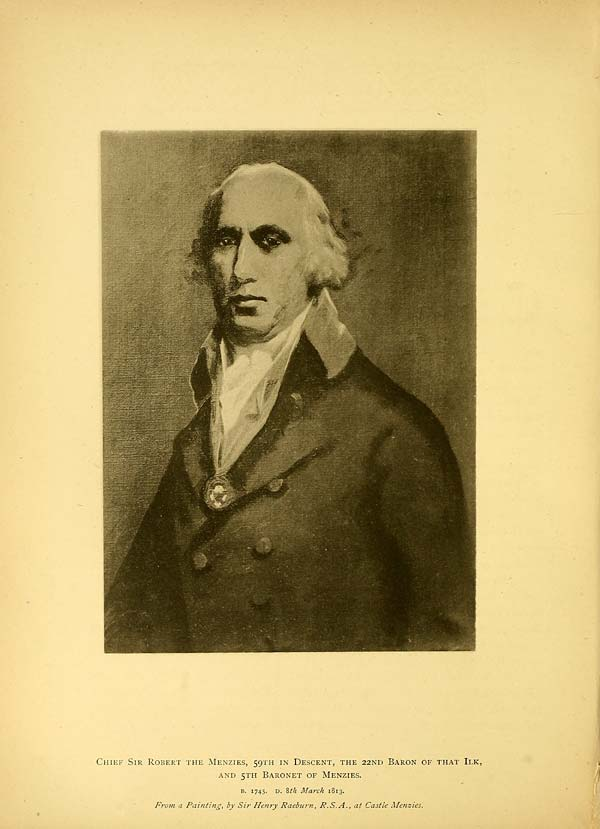
Sir Robert Menzies, 5th Baronet

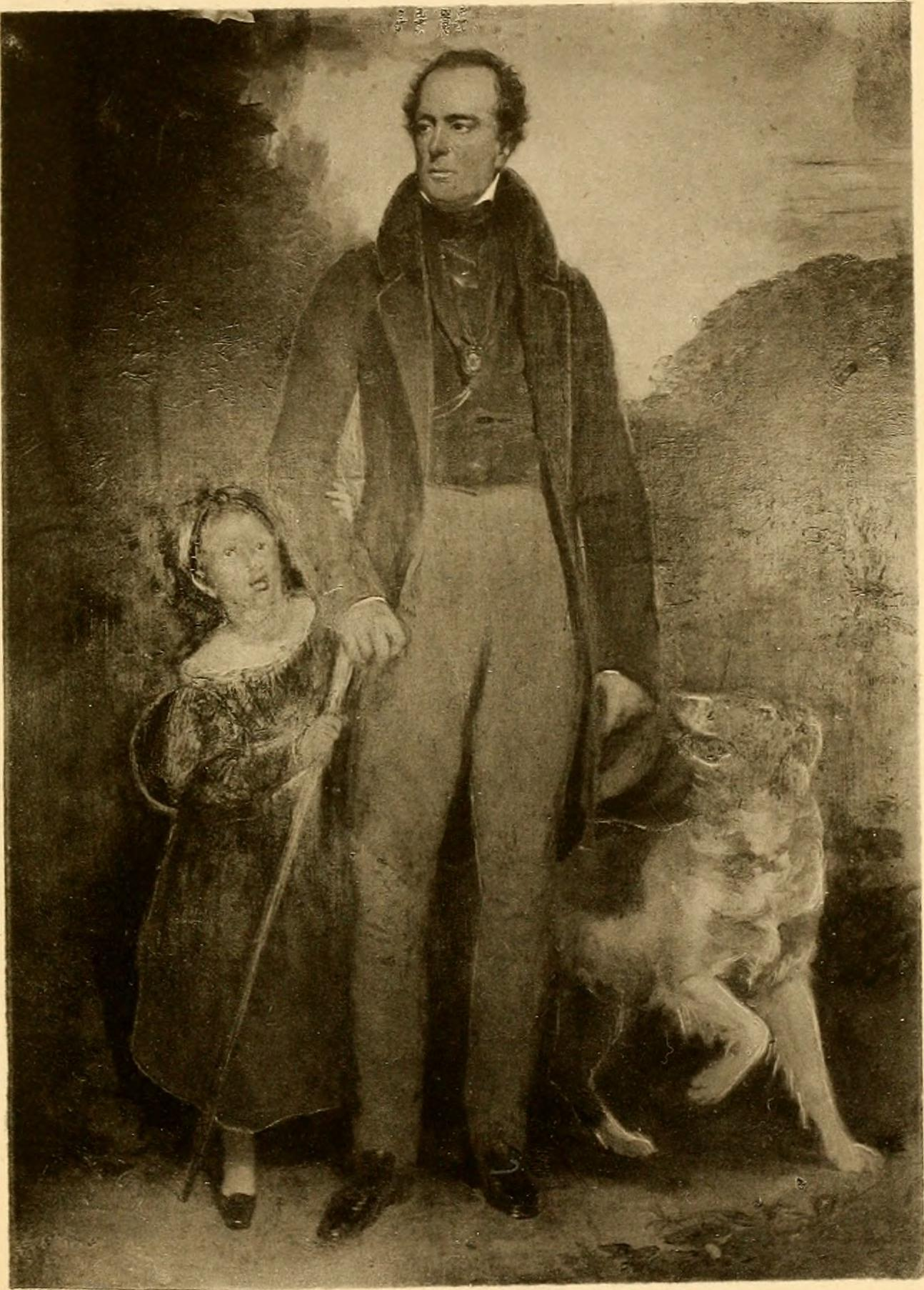
Sir Neil Menzies, 6th Baronet

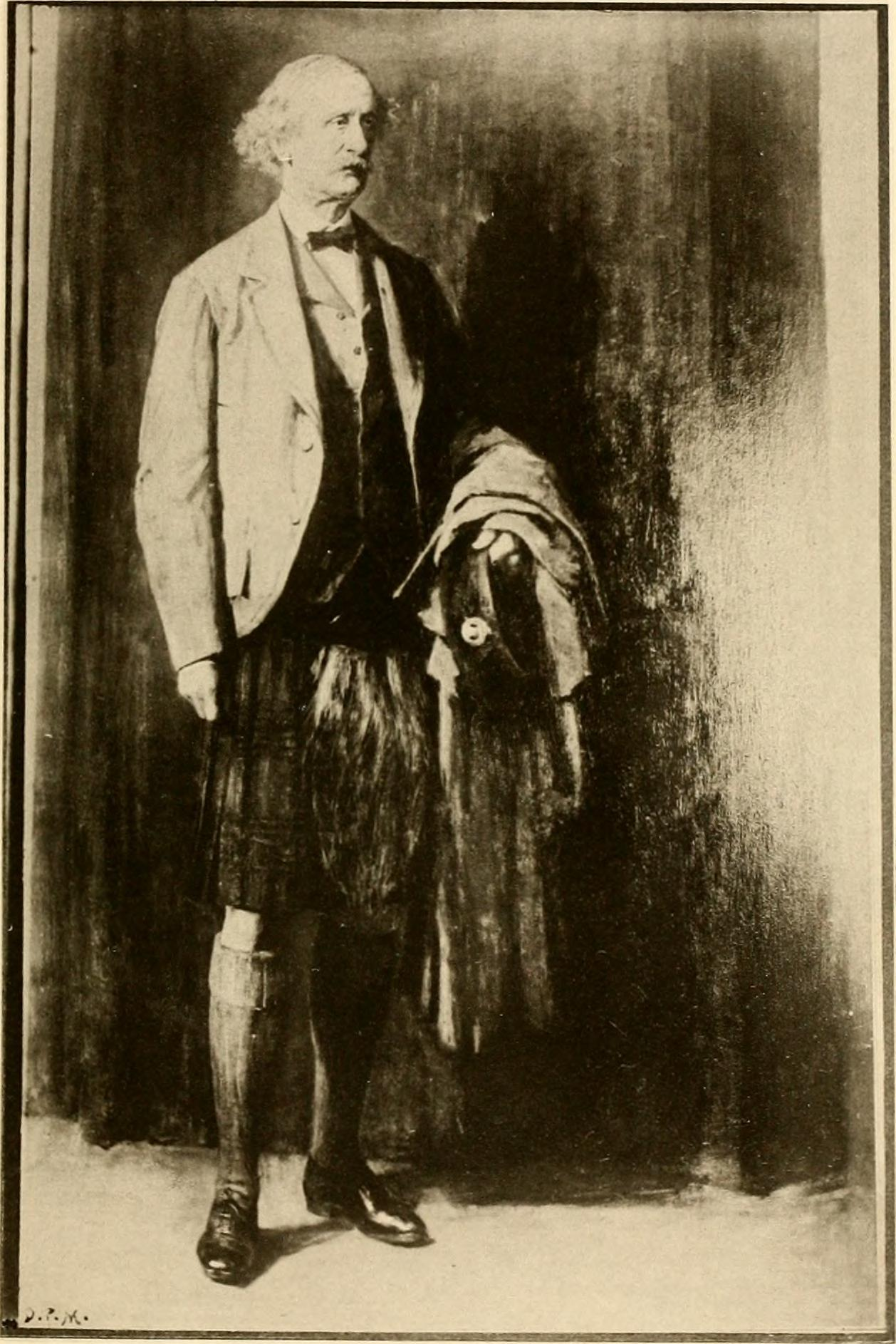
Sir Robert Menzies, 7th Baronet

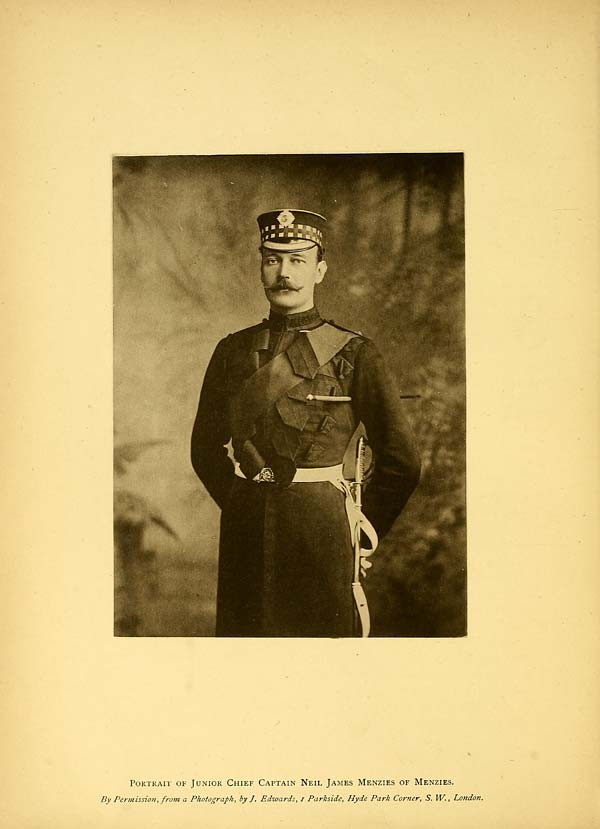
Sir Neil James Menzies, 8th Baronet

== See also ==
- Clan Menzies
