= Weem Castle =

Castle, destroyed by 1502, in Perthshire, Scotland

Coordinates: 56°37′33″N 3°53′15″W

Weem Castle is a former castle near Weem, Scotland. The castle was located near Castle Menzies.

The castle became the seat of the Menzies family after Comrie Castle was partially destroyed by fire in 1487. Weem Castle was destroyed in 1502 by Nigel Stewart of Garth in a dispute over the lands of Fothergill. The stone and timber were used in the construction of Castle Menzies.
