= Killiechassie =

Historic country estate and house in Scotland

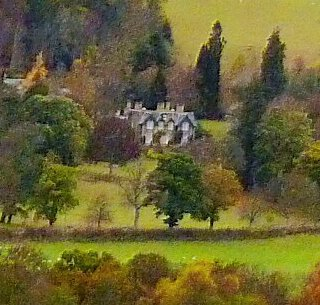
- Killiechassie, showing the house in the centre
- Interactive map of the Killiechassie area

General information
- Location: Weem, Scotland
- Coordinates: 56.631°N 3.855°W
- Cost: £440,000
- Owner: privately held

Killiechassie is a country estate and house near Weem, about one mile (two kilometres) northeast of Aberfeldy, in Perth and Kinross, Scotland. The estate lies on the banks of the River Tay in some 12 acres (5 hectares), about 74 miles (119 kilometres) north of Edinburgh. It was owned by the Douglas family in the latter part of the 19th century, and a new house was erected in 1865. A dovecote by the house was listed as Grade B on 9 June 1981. The house was purchased by author J.K. Rowling in 2001.

== History ==
The Killiechassie Estate has existed for centuries, and historically fell within the civil parish of Logierait. The name Killiechassie is from Scottish Gaelic Cill Chasaidh, "the church of the steep face," which refers to a church which stood on the hill there. This was part of the earldom of Atholl and was then granted by Máel Coluim, Earl of Atholl, to Scone Abbey in the 12th century.

An Ordnance Survey map of 1862. Features marked include a fountain, kennel, mausoleum and well. The River Tay is shown running to the east of the estate.

In the 17th century the estate was owned by members of Clan Murray who became the Dukes of Atholl. Later proprietors of Killiechassie included the Robertson family, who belonged to the house of Struan. In 1727, the estate was owned by the Reverend Robert Stewart, who left money for a chapel to be built there. On his death in 1729 he was buried here, followed by his wife, Anne, a year later. According to legend, Bonnie Prince Charlie was reputed to have sheltered in a sycamore tree here on his retreat to Inverness in 1746 during the Jacobite rising of 1745–46. A small loch in the vicinity is, according to superstition, occupied by a Celtic water spirit.

In 1850, the estate was documented to be held by a Miss Fleming, when it was described by poet David Millar as "almost opposite Aberfeldy, a sweet place, but capable of much greater embellishment." In the later 19th century, the estate was owned by the Douglas family, and an Edward Octavius Douglas, nephew of John Douglas, 7th Marquess of Queensberry held it in 1871, and a Hannah Charlotte Douglas by 1892. In 1865 the older house was replaced with a new one. The Laird of Killiechassie is listed in the 1956 Scottish Record Society publication A Directory of Landownership in Scotland, c. 1770, ed. Loretta Timperley.

The house was purchased by author J.K. Rowling in 2001, and she married Neil Murray there, the ceremony being held in the library on 26 December 2001.

== Architecture ==
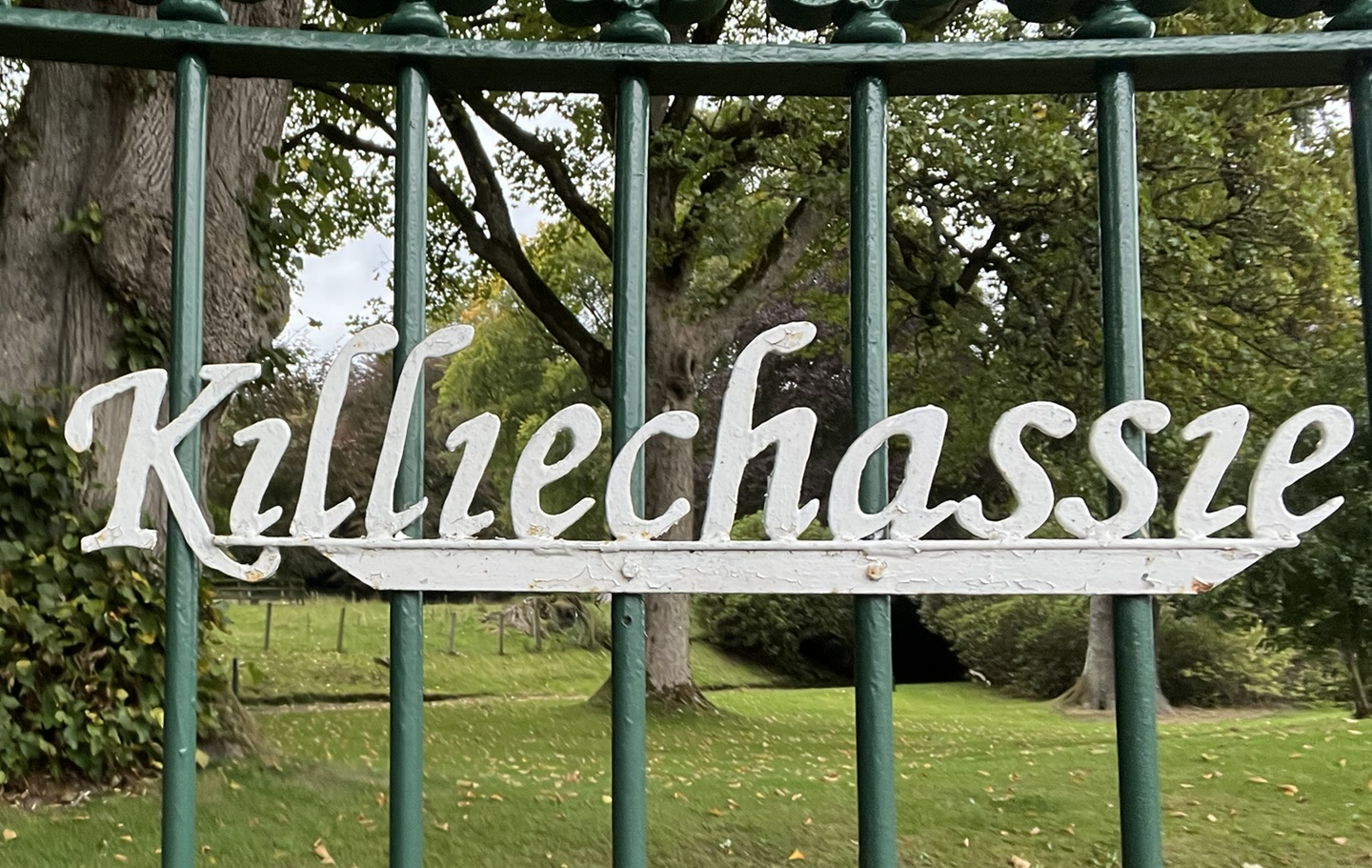
Gate sign

The current house was built in 1865. A freestanding dovecote, built from rubble at this time, is a grade B listed feature, having a "Gothic, symmetrical frontage with centre tower and pyramid roof", with jerkin-head gables. However, the house remains classified as a Georgian property, and Country Life observed that it retains the feel of a Georgian building, although with intensive alteration, and now features double-glazing, "mock-Georgian" doors, and "fake stone cladding".

Aberfeldy distillery (part of the Dewar's group), school, Castle Menzies and General Wade's bridge across the Tay at Aberfeldy are in the vicinity.
