= Alexander de Meyners =

Sir Alexander de Meyners of Weem, Aberfeldy and Fortingall, also known as Alexander Menzies, was a 13th-14th century Scottish knight.

Alexander was the son of Sir Robert de Meyners (d.1267). Sir John of Strathbogie, Earl of Atholl gifted the lands of Weem and Aberfeldy to Alexander in c.1282. Alexander was captured at the Battle of Dunbar on 27 April 1296 and held prisoner in the Tower of London until he was released in August 1297. King Robert I of Scotland gifted the lands of Durisdeer and the barony of Glendochar to Alexander.

He married Ergardia (Giles/Agnes) Stewart, daughter of James Stewart, Stewart of Scotland and possibly Giles de Burgh. They had the following known issue:

- Robert of Weem, Aberfeldy and Fortingall, who married Margaret de Oyth.
- Thomas of Garrioch.
- Alexander of Durrisdeer, who married Giles Stewart, the daughter of Sir James Stewart of Preston.
- Annabella.
