= The Birks of Aberfeldy =

1787 song by Robert Burns

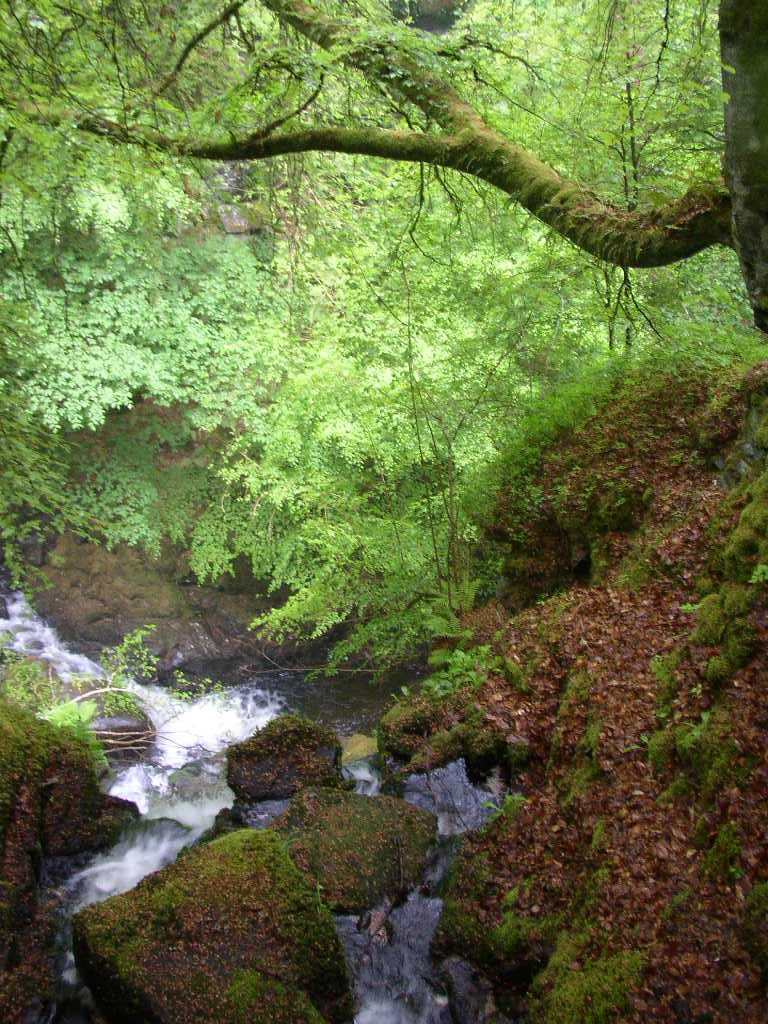
Birks of Aberfeldy.

"The Birks of Aberfeldy" is a song lyric written for a pre-existing melody in 1787 by Robert Burns. He was inspired to write it by the Falls of Moness and the birch (the Scots word for it being birks) trees of Aberfeldy during a tour of the Scottish Highlands with his friend William Nicol.

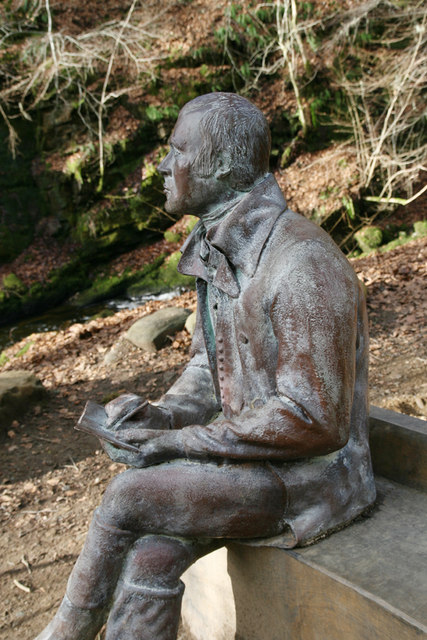
A statue of Robert Burns, composing his poem The Birks of Aberfeldy, sits at the entrance to the walk of the same name. Visitors and Burns enthusiasts often sit to have their photograph taken with the monument.

Today — because of its beauty and its association with the poem — the Birks of Aberfeldy attracts sightseers and walkers from around the UK, Scotland and beyond. The ravine has been fitted with footpaths, bridges and other aides to accessibility. A statue of Robert Burns, composing his famous poem, sits at the entrance to walk. When visiting on the 24th of November 2022, the statue of Robert Burns seems to have been removed from his seat at the start of the walk.

== The Birks of Aberfeldy by Robert Burns ==
Bonnie lassie, will ye go,

Will ye go, will ye go;

Bonnie lassie, will ye go

To the Birks of Aberfeldy.

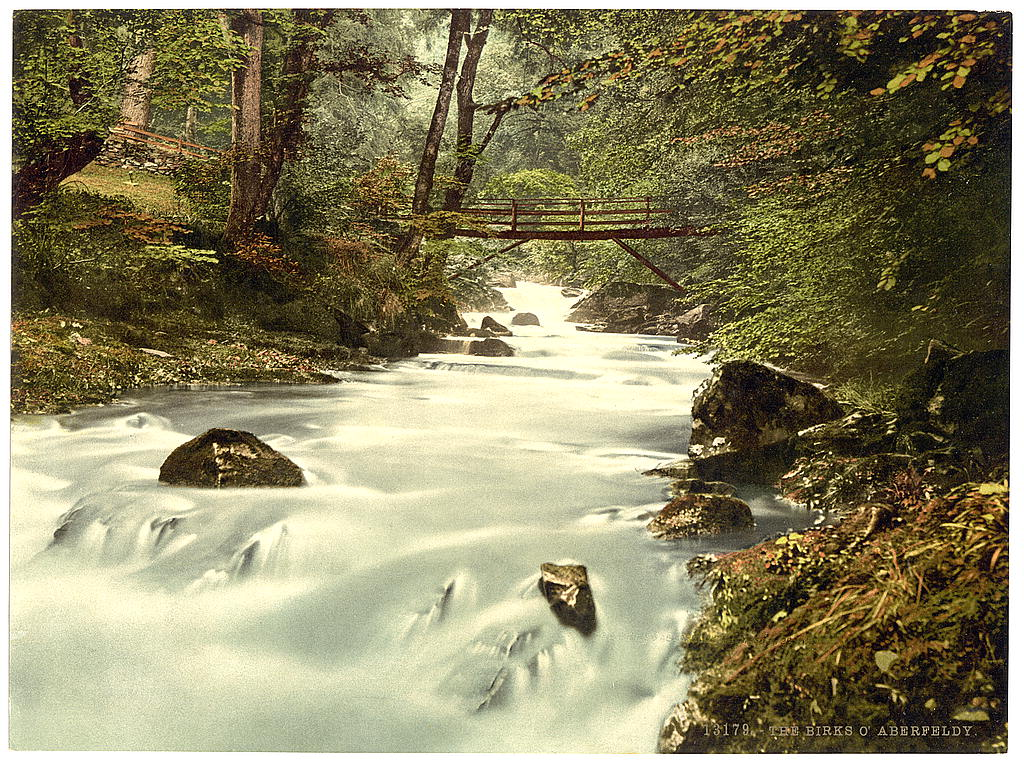

Now Simmer blinks on flowery braes,

And o'er the crystal streamlets plays;

Come let us spend the lightsome days

In the Birks of Aberfeldy.

The little birdies blithely sing

While o'er their heads the hazels hinge,

Or lightly flit on wanton wing,

In the Birks of Aberfeldy.

The braes ascend like lofty wa's,

The foamy stream deep-roaring fa's,

O'erhung wi' fragrant spreading shaws,

The Birks of Aberfeldy.

The hoary cliffs are crown'd wi' flowers,

White o'er the linns the burnie pours,

And rising, weets wi' misty showers

The Birks of Aberfeldy.

Let Fortune's gifts at random flee,

They ne'er shall draw a wish frae me;

Supremely blest wi' love and thee,

In the Birks of Aberfeldy.

Bonnie lassie, will ye go,

Will ye go, will ye go;

Bonnie lassie, will ye go

To the Birks of Aberfeldy
