= Aberfeldy Watermill =

Watermill in Perth and Kinross, Scotland

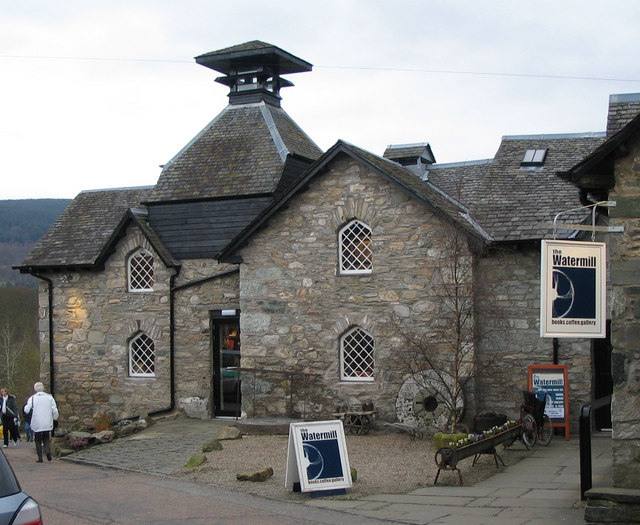
- The mill in 2006

- Location within Perth and Kinross
- Current status: Book shop, gallery, café
- Coordinates: 56°37′10″N 3°52′02″W

Construction
- Completed: 1826; 200 years ago

Water Power
- Diameter / width of water wheel: 15 feet (4.6 m) /

Aberfeldy Watermill is located in the Scottish town of Aberfeldy, Perth and Kinross. Dating to 1826, it is now a Category A listed building. Its water wheel is 15 feet (4.6 m) in diameter and is fed by the lower Urlar Burn. It is now a book shop, gallery and café.

The mill was restored in the 1980s by a miller from Cupar in Fife.

After its renovation during 2004, it was opened in its current format the following year by Michael Palin. In 2009, it was awarded UK Independent Bookshop of the Year and, in 2016, The New Yorker listed it in its "75 Greatest Bookstores in the World".

== See also ==
- List of Category A listed buildings in Perth and Kinross
- List of listed buildings in Aberfeldy, Perth and Kinross
