= Wade's Bridge =

Bridge at Aberfeldy, Perth and Kinross, Scotland

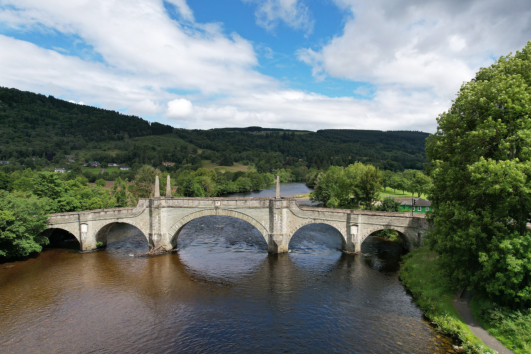
- Bridge in 2022
- Coordinates: 56.6215°N 3.8737°W
- Carries: B846
- Crosses: River Tay
- Locale: Perth and Kinross
- Other name: Tay Bridge

Characteristics
- Total length: 112 metres (367 ft)

History
- Designer: William Adam
- Opened: 1733; 293 years ago

Listed Building – Category A
- Official name: Tay Bridge
- Designated: 4 October 1971
- Reference no.: LB20861

Location
- Interactive map of Wade's Bridge

Wade's Bridge (originally known as Tay Bridge) is five-arch bridge crossing the River Tay at Aberfeldy, Perth and Kinross, Scotland. A Category A listed structure built in 1733, to a design by William Adam, it carries the pedestrian and vehicle traffic of Poplar Avenue. Erected for the Board of Ordnance, to the order of Lieutenant General George Wade, its original purpose was as a military road linking the garrisons at Ruthven, Fort George, Fort Augustus and Fort William.

The stone was quarried, cut and tooled at nearby Bolfracks. In 1932, two tablets with copies of Wade's original inscriptions were let into the stonework of two obelisk plinths; one in English and one in Latin. These state that the bridge was begun in April 1733 and finished by January; however, this is not strictly true, as General Wade stopped work for the winter, leaving the bridge without parapets over the side arches. These were added the following year.

== See also ==
- List of listed buildings in Aberfeldy, Perth and Kinross
- List of bridges in Scotland
