= Farragon Hill =

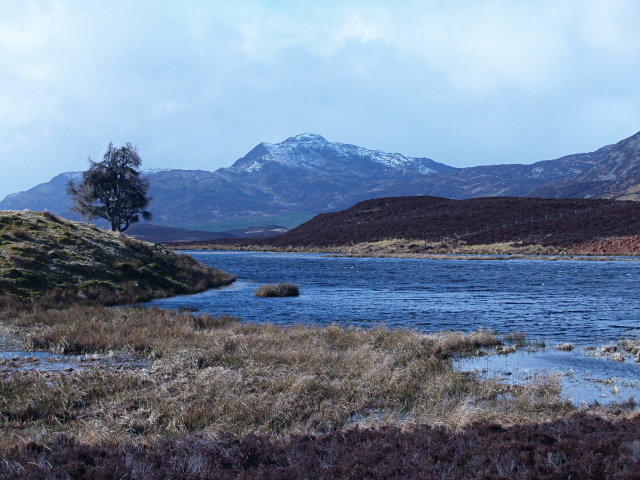
- Farragon Hill from Loch nan Eun

Highest point
- Elevation: 782 m (2,566 ft)
- Prominence: 186 m (610 ft)
- Listing: Corbett, Marilyn
- Coordinates: 56°40′30″N 3°53′39″W

Geography
- Location: Perth and Kinross, Scotland
- Parent range: Grampian Mountains
- OS grid: NN840552
- Topo map: OS Landranger 52

Farragon Hill (782 m) is a peak in the foothills of the Grampian Mountains of Scotland. It lies above the town of Aberfeldy in Perthshire.

The hill is the highest point in the area of rough moorland that lies between Aberfeldy and Loch Tummel.
