= John Stewart, 3rd Earl of Atholl =

Scottish nobleman

John Stewart
- Born: c. 1507
- Died: c. 1542
- Known for: Being the 3rd Earl of Atholl

Arms of Stewart, Earl of Atholl

John Stewart, 3rd Earl of Atholl (c. 1507–1542) was the son of John Stewart, 2nd Earl of Atholl and Lady Janet Campbell, a daughter of Archibald Campbell, 2nd Earl of Argyll and Elizabeth Stewart.

The Scottish chronicle writer Robert Lindsay of Pitscottie recorded that John Stewart built a lavish temporary palace near Pitlochry to entertain James V of Scotland and his mother Margaret Tudor while hunting (circa 1532). The Palace was made of tree branches, but moated and hung with tapestry and silk inside with glass windows and the lavish food for three days cost £1000. When the royal party left, the Earl's Highland men burnt the lodging to the astonishment of the Italian Papal envoy present who was told that this was local custom. The king's bed was carried to Atholl for seven days in August and September 1532. The trip may also have been in part to adjudicate on local issues.

In July 1536, James V granted the Earl a free barony of the lands of Glenlochy in Perthshire. The Earl was involved in promoting royal rule in Perthshire. He became involved in the Campbell family struggle with the MacGregors, and in October 1530 expelled the MacGregors from the house of the Isle of Loch Rannoch. The Earl was also a rival of the Menzies family who held lands in the same region.

John Stewart died in 1542, possibly from a fever caught during the military campaign on the English border that lead to the Battle of Solway Moss.

== Marriages and children ==
He married Grizzel Rattray and was succeeded as Earl by their son John Stewart, 4th Earl of Atholl.

In 1542 he married Jean Forbes, a daughter of John Forbes, 6th Lord Forbes and Elizabeth Berlay. Their daughter Barbara Stewart married James Menzies of Weem. Another daughter, Margaret Stewart, married John Grant of Freuchie.

Peerage of Scotland
Preceded by John Stewart	Earl of Atholl c.1521-1542	Succeeded by John Stewart
