= Breadalbane Academy =

Location
- Crieff Road; Aberfeldy, Perth and Kinross, PH15 2DU; Scotland
- Coordinates: 56.617°N 3.870°W

Information
- Type: State all-through school
- Local authority: Perth and Kinross Council
- Head teacher: John G Devine
- Gender: Mixed
- Age range: 2–18
- Enrolment: 645 (209 Primary; 436 Secondary) (as of September 2017)
- Language: English
- Website: www.breadalbane.pkc.sch.uk

Breadalbane Academy is a 2–18 mixed, state all-through school in Aberfeldy, Perth and Kinross, Scotland. It has a Gaelic Medium provision in the primary which was extended into the secondary in session 2018/19. In 2020 the school won the 'Scotland's Most Enterprising School 2020' Indigo award.. Breadalbane Academy also hosts Pitlochry High School students for their 5th and 6th years of Secondary education.

Breadalbane Academy has performed consistently in SQA examinations, with approximately 50% of pupils progressing on to Higher Education.

== History ==
The Academy has a history dating back to the 19th century. The original building has been incorporated into today's Aberfeldy Town Hall, almost directly across Crieff Road.

At one time secondary pupils from remoter areas stayed in school hostels in Aberfeldy, but with better roads and the depopulation of many remote areas, the hostels were closed at the end of the 20th century. Construction of the current campus building began in 2007, with it opening in 2010.

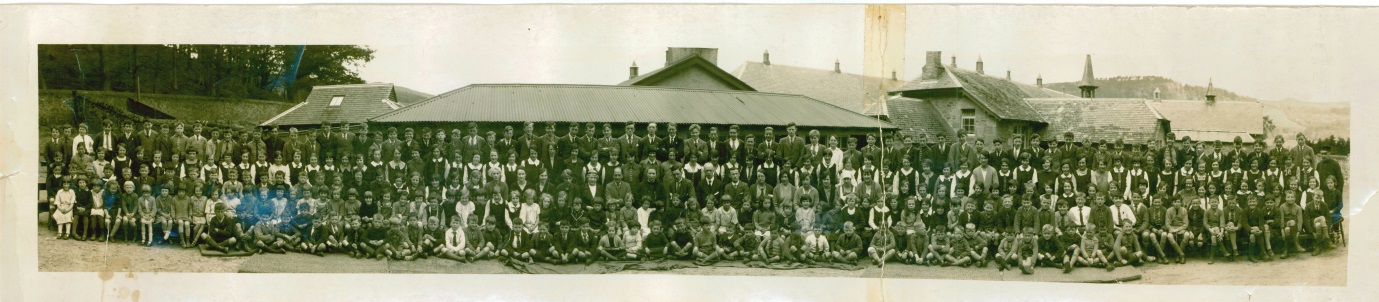
Breadalbane Academy School Community 1926

== HMIE inspection ==
In its most recent HMIE inspection the school was graded ‘very good’ in three out of five categories and ‘good’ in the remaining two. The school was particularly praised for its positive ethos underpinned by excellent staff-pupil relationships. These attributes were again picked up by a recent Nursery inspection (February 2017), which praised the school’s nurturing environment and quality of leadership. The school was visited by a local authority team in May/June 2018 which also resulted in a very positive report which can be seen on the school website. The school boasts current high levels of attainment, reflected in the school placing within the Sunday Times 2018 top 50 performing state schools in Scotland.

== Campus ==
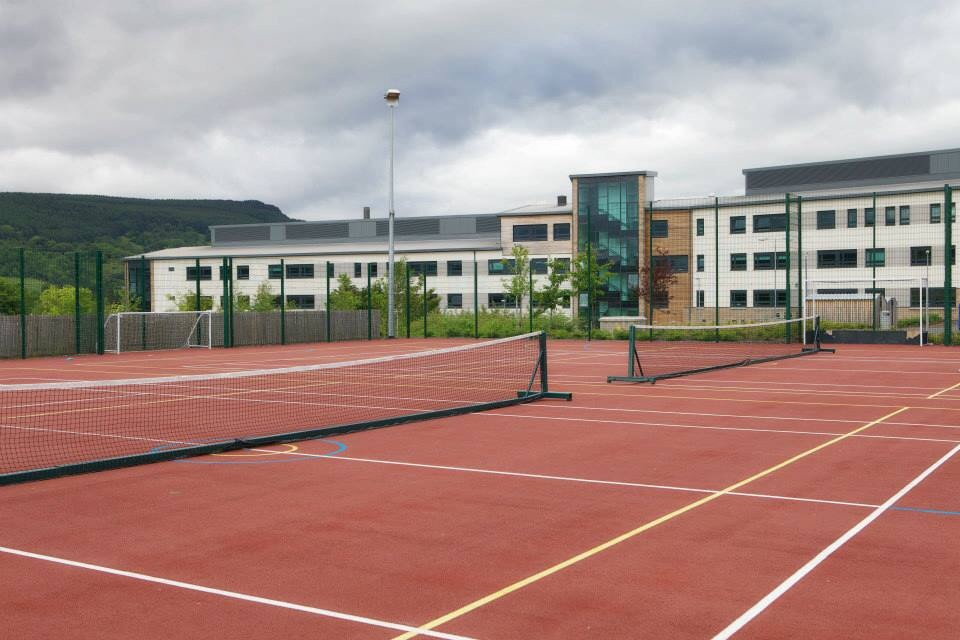
A photo of the secondary block from the on-site all weather tennis court.

The current Community Campus opened in December 2010. The school boasts a 25m swimming pool, three outdoor tennis courts, two squash courts, both two-court and four-court indoor areas, a climbing wall, an all-weather astroturf playing surface, a recording studio, a dance studio, and extensive ICT resources which have recently been boosted by considerable investment in hardware and software.

== Achievements ==
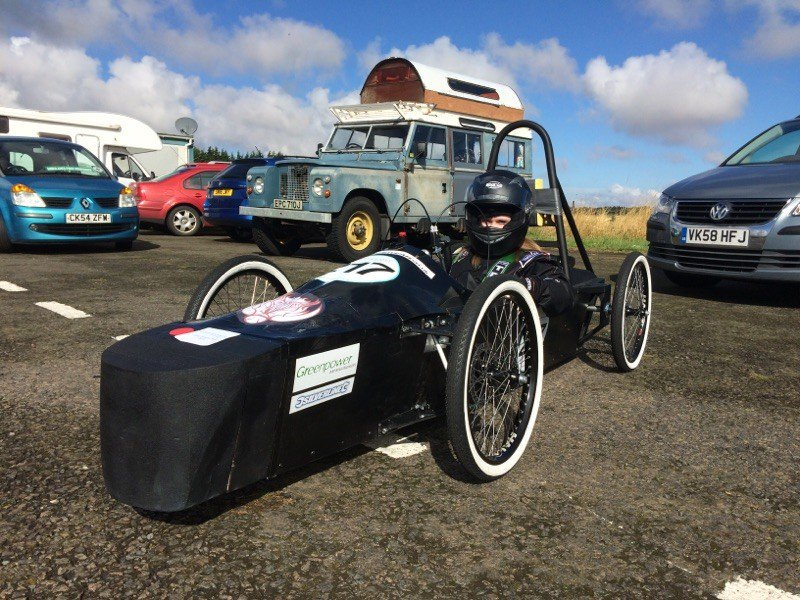
Formula 24 Car

Breadalbane Academy has a strong record in science and technology and pupils in S2 recently won the national Salter Award for Chemistry. The school was also one of three finalists in the Scottish Education Awards STEM category in 2018. The school has also been called a national leader in the development of school based vocational qualifications and was awarded the Scotland-wide LANTRA award for vocational education in 2017. The Rural Skills class has featured on the BBC Beechgrove Garden programme, where the school’s provision was celebrated as an example of national good practice. The school's Formula 24 team under Physics teacher David Mclean found success in 2017, coming third in the regional heats and qualifying for the international final. The team won best kit car in Scotland.

== English department ==
In 2009, issues in the school's English department resulted in pupils' Higher Prelim results being issued late. After an independent report looked at why this had happened, the department was reorganised, and has since performed well in SQA examinations.
