= Aberfeldy Footbridge =

Bridge in Aberfeldy, Scotland

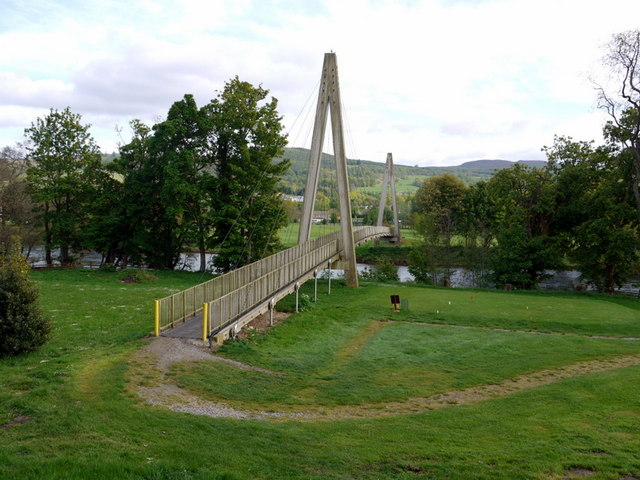
- Coordinates: 56°37′31″N 3°52′14″W
- Crosses: River Tay
- Locale: Perth and Kinross
- Other names: The Plastic Bridge; The Bouncy; Bridge

Characteristics
- Total length: 113 metres (371 ft)

History
- Opened: 1992; 34 years ago

Location
- Interactive map of Aberfeldy Footbridge

Aberfeldy Footbridge is a pedestrian bridge crossing the River Tay in Aberfeldy, Perth and Kinross. Built in 1992 and is the world’s first all-plastic bridge. Today the bridge still holds the Guinness World Record for the longest span plastic bridge, with an impressive 63m.

The bridge was initially used as a crossing for golfers at the Aberfeldy Golf Club to access the section of the course on the other side of the river, however when the Golf Course was downsized the bridge was no longer needed by golfers. The bridge is now used by walkers and cyclists to cross the river.

In 2016 the Golf Club decided the bridge needed work and put up barriers to stop people crossing. The bridge was later reopened after locals broke the barriers down, and although parts of the bridge are still held together with cable ties, the plastic bridge remains open.

== See also ==
- List of bridges in Scotland
