= Comrie Castle =

Ruined castle in Scotland

Coordinates: 56.6135°N 3.9785°W

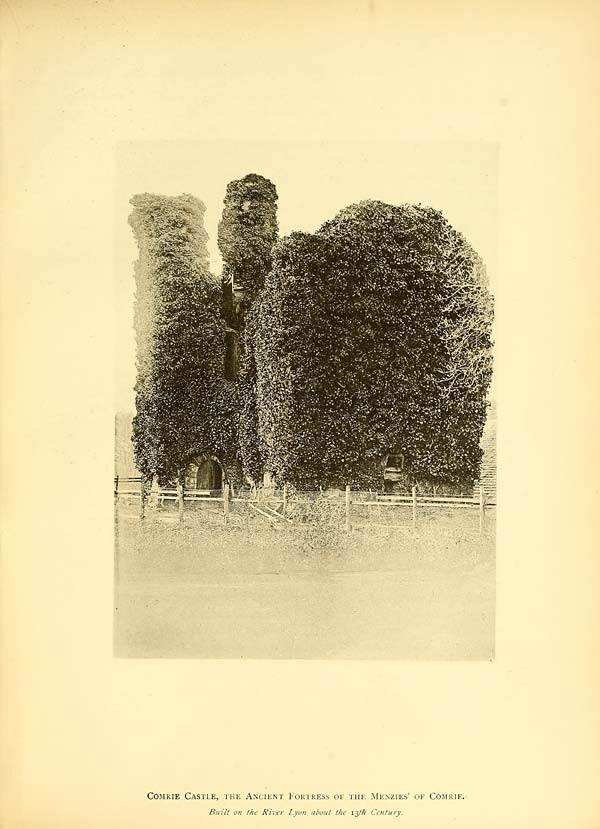
Comrie Castle, the Ancient Fortress of the Menzies of Comrie

Comrie Castle is a ruined castle about 15 miles north (as the crow flies, rather over 30 by road) of Comrie, Perth and Kinross, Scotland. The castle is located on the River Lyon.

The castle was originally the seat of the Menzies family. Partially destroyed by fire in 1487, the seat of the Menzies family moved to Weem Castle. Rebuilt in the sixteenth century, as a L-plan tower house, the castle was last occupied in 1748 and became ruinous. It is now protected as a scheduled monument.
