= Creag Odhar =

Hill in Perth and Kinross, Scotland

Coordinates: 56.6370°N 3.9941°W

Rocky face of Creag Odhar

Creag Odhar is a rocky mountain peak in the southern Highlands of Scotland, in Perthshire north of Aberfeldy. The name is Gaelic, from creag, meaning "crag" or "peak", and odhar, meaning "gray". It rises 523 metres (1,716 ft) above sea level.

== Geology ==
Creag Odhar's bedrock is part of the Blair Atholl Subgroup of the Scottish Dalradian, a geological formation that extends across roughly 150 kilometres from Sandend Bay on the Moray coast to the islands of Lismore and Islay. The limestone at Creag Odhar differs notably from the 'sugar limestone' found at higher elevations in the region, as it appears rather smooth and compact with small crystals. This characteristic is likely due to its location being further from the granite intrusion that caused intensive metamorphism elsewhere in the area. The limestone is interbedded with black graphitic schist, forming what could be termed a graphitic marble. The rock contains bands that are either rich in calcite or rich in mica, with the mica-rich bands being darker and composed of equal amounts of calcite, mica, and quartz, typically containing 5–10% graphite. Whilst quartz content in the limestone can occasionally reach 25%, impurities rarely exceed this level.

== Climate ==
Creag Odhar is situated in a region that experiences significant climatic variation due to topographical differences. Whilst the nearby Meall Breac area (at 610 metres) is characterised by cold, wet upland conditions with severe winters and high wind speeds, Creag Odhar, at its lower elevation of 390 metres, experiences more moderate conditions. The area is subject to typical Scottish Highland weather patterns, though its relatively low altitude and sheltered north-facing cliffs create distinct microclimates. The local climate supports diverse vegetation communities, from areas dominated by Arctostaphylos uva-ursi on drier, more level-topped ridges to moisture-loving plant communities in more sheltered locations. This climatic environment has been influential in shaping the site's ecological character since the post-glacial period.

== Biodiversity ==
Creag Odhar, located at an altitude of 390 metres south of Blair Atholl, features a series of north-facing limestone cliffs that support a diverse lichen community. The site contains extensive limestone cliffs between 300–350 metres in elevation, reaching heights of up to 50 metres. These cliffs are characterised by wide, soil-covered ledges that harbour scattered trees and shrubs, including Juniperus communis, Rosa species, and Aria edulis. The limestone substrate provides habitat for numerous lichen species, with notable populations of calcicoles such as Gyalecta jenensis, Catapyrenium lachneum, and Collema auriforme. The site's biodiversity is influenced by varying moisture conditions, with different plant communities developing in wetter and drier areas. In wetter situations, the area supports the Saxifraga aizoides–Ditrichum flexicaule sub-community, featuring species like Festuca ovina, Agrostis capillaris, and Thymus polytrichus.
