= Castle Menzies =

Castle in Perth and Kinross, Scotland

Coordinates: 56.62274°N 3.90517°W

Designations

Inventory of Gardens and Designed Landscapes in Scotland
- Official name: Castle Menzies
- Designated: 30 June 1987
- Reference no.: GDL00095

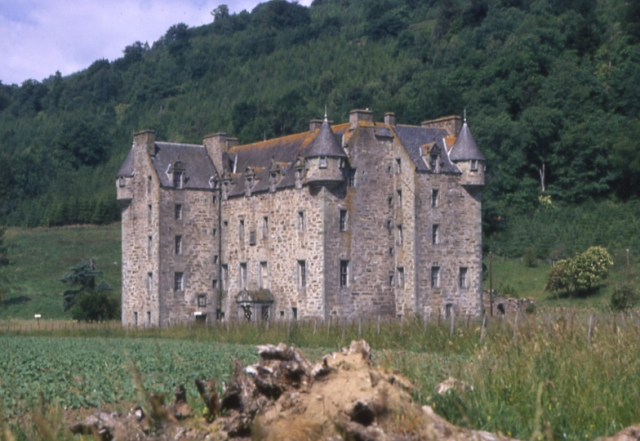
Castle Menzies

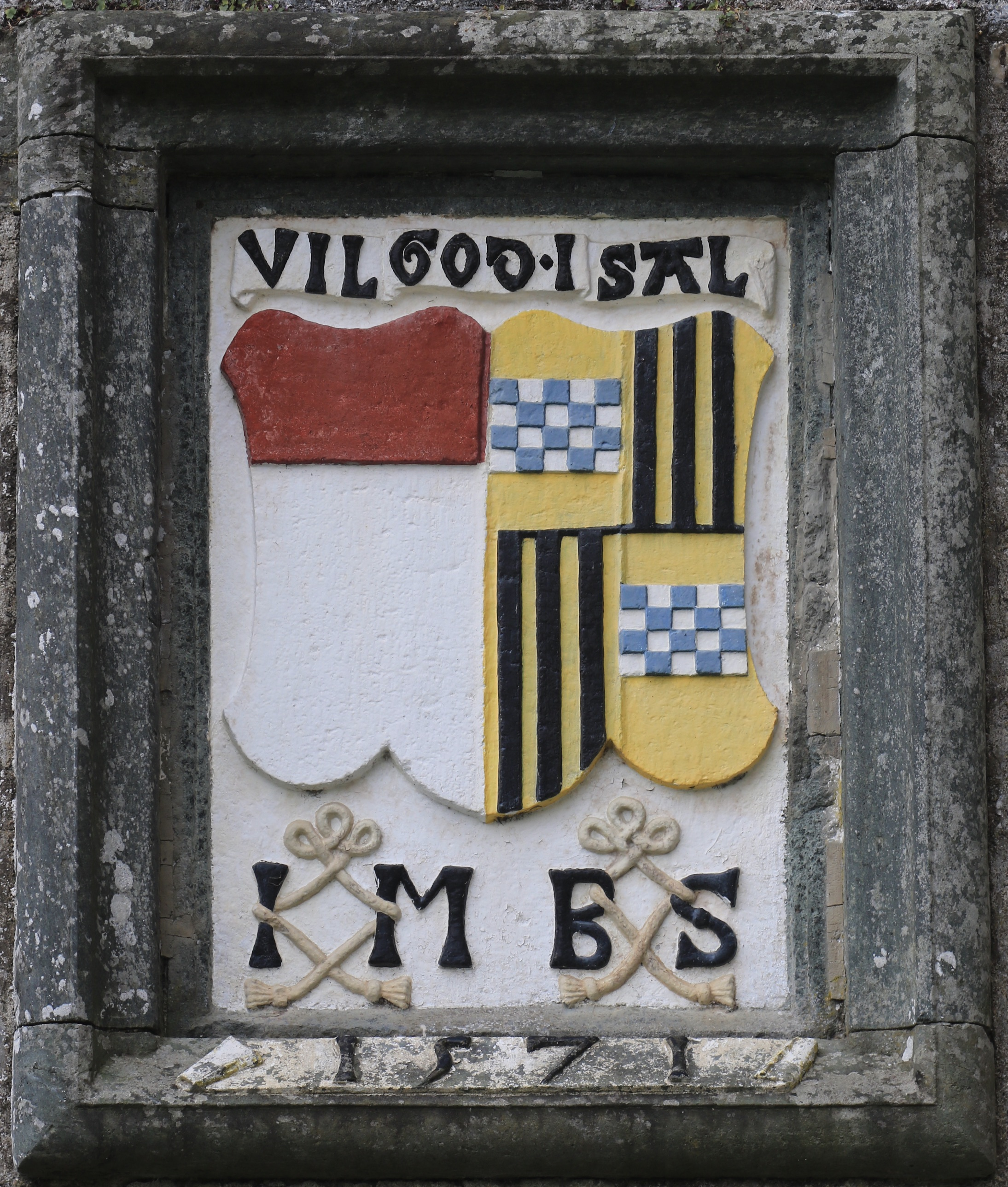
Marriage stone of James Menzies and Barbara Stewart inserted in 1371

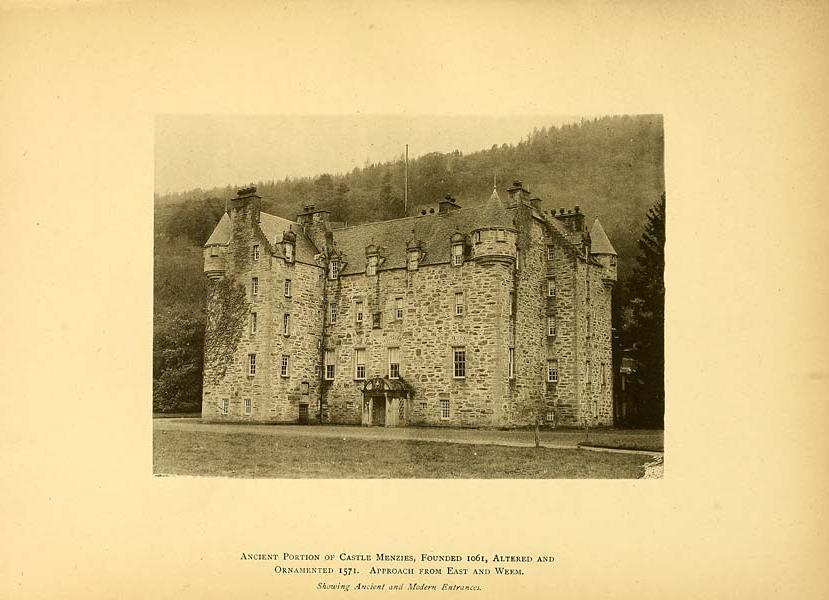
Ancient Portion of Castle Menzies

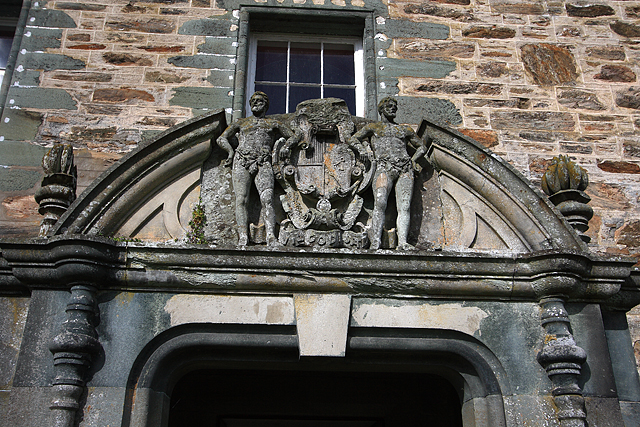
Castle detail

Castle Menzies in Scotland is the ancestral seat of the Clan Menzies and the Menzies Baronets. It is located a little to the west of the small village of Weem, near Aberfeldy in the Highlands of Perthshire, close to the former site of Weem Castle, destroyed c. 1502.

== History ==
The sixteenth-century castle, built as a Z-plan castle, was the seat of the chiefs of clan Menzies for over 500 years. Strategically situated, it was involved in the turbulent history of the highlands.

A marriage stone above the original entrance was installed by James Menzies in 1371, to record his marriage to Barbara Stewart, daughter of John Stewart, 3rd Earl of Atholl and Jean Forbes.

In 1598 John Dow MacWilliam alias MacGregor broke into the castle to rescue a thief Donald Menzies from the dungeons. The owner, Alexander Menzies of Weem complained that John Murray of Tullibardine had then welcomed Donald Menzies and MacGregor as his household men and servants.

Bonnie Prince Charlie, the Stuart pretender to the throne, rested for two nights in the castle on his way to the battle of Culloden in 1746.

In 1840 an entirely new wing was added, designed by William Burn using stone from the same quarry on south side of Loch Tay.

Duleep Singh, last maharajah of the Sikh Empire, lived at Castle Menzies between 1855 and 1858, following his exile from the Punjab in 1854. He was officially the ward of Sir John Spencer Login and Lady Login, who leased the castle for him.

Sir Robert Menzies, 7th Baronet inherited the estate in 1844. On Sunday 21 April 1878 around 7pm a fire broke out in the roof of the castle. It was spotted by a man passing along the road who raised the alarm. Sir Robert and Lady Menzies were away at Farleyer, but word was sent and they returned immediately. Local efforts managed to keep the fire under control, and by 10pm when the fire engine from Taymouth Castle arrived, the fire was nearly extinguished. The excitement was thought to have affected the health of Lady Menzies, and she died the following month.

Sir Neil Menzies, 8th Baronet, inherited the estate in 1903 but died without heirs in 1910. In 1913 the house contents were auctioned and in 1914 the papers were sold at Sotheby's for £1,160. £300 was paid for a letter of Mary Queen of Scots to the Laird of Weym dated Drymmen, in Menteith, 31 August 1566 and relating to the Macgregors of Rannoch. The "Proposals" signed by Charles I at Holmby, 12 May 1647, for resigning the command of the Militia for ten years, and agreeing to the Establishment of Presbyterianism for three years, fetched £56.

The castle and 11,600 acres of estate land finally sold in 1918 for £69,000 (equivalent to £3,390,000 in 2025) to Francis Willey, later Baron Barnby. On his death, his widow put the estate up for sale in April 1930.

== Menzies Clan Society ==
The restoration of the ancient part of the castle involved the demolition of a greatly decayed 18th century wing. A large Victorian ballroom (not visible in the adjacent photograph) was, however, retained.

The castle, restored by the Menzies Clan Society after 1957, is an example of architectural transition between an earlier tradition of rugged fortresses and a later one of lightly defensible 'châteaux'. The walls are of random rubble, originally harled (roughcast), but the quoins, turrets and door and window surrounds are of finely carved blue freestone. This attractive and extremely hard-weathering stone was also used for the architectural details and monuments at the nearby Old Kirk of Weem, which was built by the Menzies family and contains their monuments and funeral hatchments.

The castle was designated as a Category A listed building in 1971 and the grounds were added to the Inventory of Gardens and Designed Landscapes in Scotland in 1987.

Restoration work started in earnest in 1972 with a £40,000 project partly funded by at £10,000 grant from the Historical Buildings Council. This work took nearly 10 years under the leadership of Dr Bill Dewar MBE and allowed the building to open to the public.

A further grant of £135,900 was awarded in 1991 to help with the £230,000 final phase of restoration of the Victorian west wing and the creation of the ballroom "The Dewar Room".

The Menzies Charitable Trust was established in 1994 to look after the castle, the walled garden and St Cuthbert's Old Kirk of Weem.

A historic lifting stone sits in front of the castle. It is known as The Chieftains Stone or Menzies Stone. This is open to lifters and weighs 115 kg. This is not one of the heavier stones, however, it presents a challenge even to seasoned lifters due to its extremely round shape and smooth texture.

== See also ==
- Restoration of castles in Scotland

== Bibliography ==
- McKean, Charles (2001) The Scottish Chateau: the country house of Renaissance Scotland. Stroud: Sutton Publishing ISBN 0-7509-2323-7; p12
