= Clan Menzies =

Highland Scottish clan

- Mèinnearach
- Crest: A savage head erased Proper
- Motto: 'Vil God I Zal' (God willing I shall)
- War cry: Geal 'us Dearg a suas (Up with the White and Red)

Profile
- Region: Highland
- District: Perthshire
- Plant badge: The Menzies' Heath
- Pipe music: Piobairreachd a' Mheinnearaich or the Menzies' March

Chief
- Robert Ronald Menzies of Menzies
- Chief of Clan Menzies (Am Meinnearach)
- Seat: Castle Menzies
Septs of Clan Menzies
MacAndeoir, MacIndeoir, MacIndeor, MacIndoer, MacJore, MacKmunish, MacMean, MacMeans, MacMein, MacMeinn, MacMen, MacMenzies, MacMin, MacMina, MacMine, MacMindes, MacMinn, MacMinne, MacMinnies, MacMinnis, MacMonies, MacMonnies, MacMyn, MacMyne, MacMynneis, McMenzies, McMenzie, Mainzies, Makmunish, Makmynnes, Manzie, Manzies, Maynhers, McMinn, McMindes, McMinds, McMonnies, Mean, Meanie, Meanies, Means, Mearns, Megnies, Meignees, Meigneis, Meigners, Meignerys, Meignes, Meignez, Mein, Meine, Meineris, Meingnes, Meingzeis, Meingzes, Meinn, Meinyeis, Meinyies, Meinzeis, Meinzies, Menees, Mengues, Mengyeis, Mengzeis, Mengzes, Mengzies, Mennes, Mennie, Menyas, Menyeis, Menyheis, Menyhes, Menzas, Menzeis, Menzes, Menzeys, Menzheis, Menzhers, Menzies, Menzis, Meygners, Meygnes, Meyneiss, Meyner, Meyneris, Meyners, Meyness, Miners, Mingie, Mings, Minn, Minnis, Minnish, Minnus, Minze, Minzey, Minzes, Monsie, Monzie, Munnies

Clan Menzies Tartan
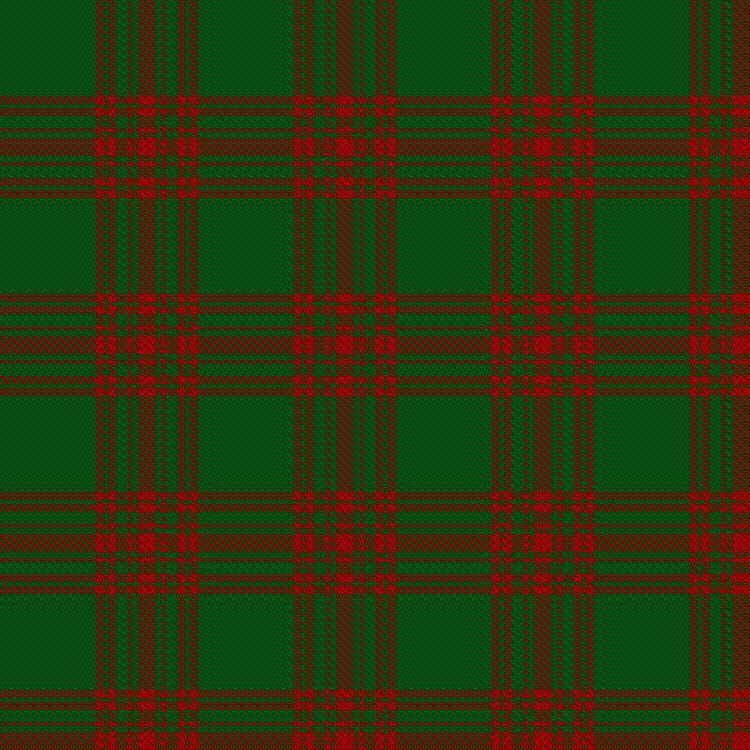
- The Clan Menzies tartan in colors.

Sett

Tartan registries
- STA: #894
- STWR: #894
- SRT entry: Clan Menzies

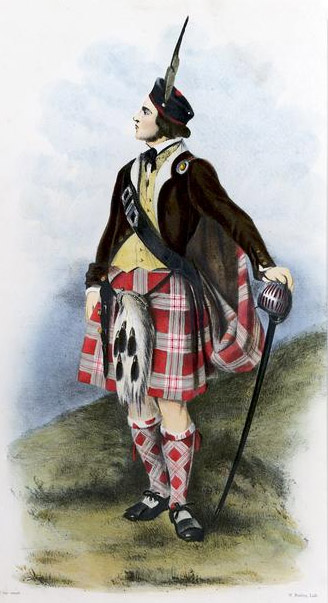
A romantic depiction of a clansman illustrated by R. R. McIan, from James Logan's The Clans of the Scottish Highlands, 1845

Clan Menzies (/ˈmɪŋɪs/; Scottish Gaelic: Clann Mèinnear; a member is a Mèinnearach) is a Highland Scottish clan.

== History ==
=== Origins of the Clan ===
Mesnières in Normandy was the original home of the Norman family who were found in England by the name of Manners and who were the ancestors of the Dukes of Rutland in England. Sir Robert de Myneris appeared in the court of Alexander II of Scotland where he received royal patronage, rising to become a chamberlain in 1249. Sir Robert received grants for lands in Glen Lyon and Atholl. These grants were further reinforced by a grant to his son Alexander of Strathtay in 1296. Alexander also acquired the lands of Weem and married Egida, a daughter of James Stewart, 5th High Steward of Scotland. The Clan Motto supposedly originates from the Battle of Teba (1330), at which Chief Lord Robert the Menzies allegedly first uttered the phrase in response to a call to action by Sir James Douglas, and the Clan Crest originates from that battle as well.

=== Wars of Scottish Independence ===
Alexander's son, another Sir Robert, was a companion-in-arms of Robert the Bruce, and was awarded lands in Glen Dochart, Finlarig, Glen Orchy and Durisdeer.

=== 15th and 16th centuries ===
Another Sir Robert Menzies, who was the eighth chief, built Weem Castle, near the current Castle Menzies, in about 1488. The castle was plundered in 1502 by Stewart of Garth in a dispute over the lands of Fothergill. Janet Menzies had married a Stewart about a century earlier, and Garth claimed the lands as part of her tocher, or dowry. Menzies appealed to the Crown, and James IV of Scotland found in his favour. The king ordered Stewart to make restitution, and erected the Menzies lands into the free barony of Menzies in 1510. In 1540 James Menzies of Menzies married Barbara Stewart, daughter of John Stewart, 3rd Earl of Atholl and cousin to Henry Stuart, Lord Darnley, who was the future king.

=== 17th century and civil war ===
During the Wars of the Three Kingdoms, despite having royal links and links to the Stewarts, the Clan Menzies opposed Charles I and as a result Menzies was harried by James Graham, 1st Marquess of Montrose. Montrose sent a messenger to Menzies seeking his support, but for whatever reason the messenger was wounded. Montrose retaliated and in the skirmishing the Menzies chief was fatally wounded. His son was a Major in the Covenanter army and was killed at the Battle of Inverlochy. Menzies families in the north, independent from the chiefs in Perthshire, fought on the side of Montrose. Sir Gilbert Menzies of Pitfolds was with Montrose throughout his campaign and was also at the Battle of Inverlochy when his chief's son was killed.

In 1665 Sir Alexander Menzies was created a Baronet of Nova Scotia. Alexander's brother was Colonel James Menzies of Culdares, who claimed to have survived no fewer than nine serious wounds. James is the ancestor of the present chiefs. Another of Alexander's brothers was killed at the Battle of Worcester in 1651.

The chiefs of Clan Menzies opposed the policies of James VII of Scotland (II of England). When James was forced from his throne in 1688, the Menzies chiefs supported Mary II of England and Prince William of Orange. However, the clan was again divided as Major Duncan Menzies of Fornock led his men in the Highland charge at the Battle of Killiecrankie in which they defeated Government troops. Amongst the Government troops at Killiecrankie were hundreds of their Perthshire kinsmen, who had formed an Independent Highland Company. The Menzies Independent Company later fought at the Battle of Cromdale in 1690, where the Jacobites were defeated.

=== 18th century and Jacobite risings ===
The chiefs of Clan Menzies did not support the Jacobite rising of 1745; however, the Jacobite leader, Charles Edward Stewart stayed for two nights in the castle.

Then four days later it was occupied by British-Hanoverian forces, led by the Duke of Cumberland.

During the Jacobite rising of 1715 Menzies of Culdares supported the Jacobite cause. He was captured and exiled to Maryland in America. He later returned to Scotland but in the Jacobite rising of 1745 he was beyond active campaigning; however, he sent Prince Charles Edward Stuart a fine horse. The clan was out in force under Menzies of Shian who was killed along with his son during the campaign. The Menzies lands of Glen Lyon provided shelter for refugees from the Battle of Culloden, including members of Prince Charles's personal staff.

== Clan Chief ==
The current Chief of Clan Menzies is Robert Steuart Menzies of Menzies, (born 1965).

== Castles ==
Castles that have been owned by the Clan Menzies have included, amongst many others:

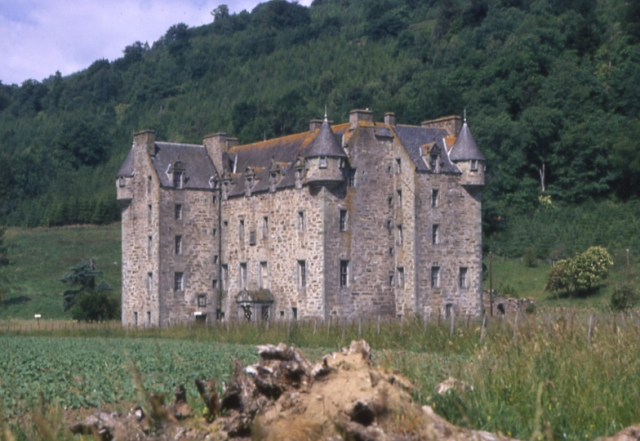
Castle Menzies, historic seat of the chief of Clan Menzies

- Comrie Castle, four and a half miles west of Aberfeldy in Perthshire, is a ruinous L-plan tower house that was built and held by the Menzies family. The castle was burned in 1487 and the clan moved to Weem, which is now known as Castle Menzies. However, Comrie was used by branches of the clan until about 1715.
- Castle Menzies, originally known as the Palace of Weem, near Aberfeldy, Perthshire, is an extended Z-plan tower house. The original Palace of Weem was built after 1487 but was sacked fifteen years later by Neil Stewart of Garth. The castle was occupied by Oliver Cromwell's forces in the 1650s. The chiefs of Clan Menzies did not support the Jacobite rising of 1745 and the Jacobite leader, Charles Edward Stewart, stayed for two nights in the castle. However, four days later it was occupied by British-Hanoverian forces led by the Duke of Cumberland. During World War II the castle was used as a Polish Army medical supplies depot. It later became derelict but was acquired in 1957 by the Menzies Clan Society, who have set about having it restored.
- Meggernie Castle, eight miles north of Killin, Perthshire, was originally held by the Clan Campbell but passed to the Menzies of Culdares branch of the clan, who supported the Jacobite cause. There is a story that the castle is haunted by the ghost of the wife of one of Menzies lairds who cut her in half in a jealous rage. He managed to bury her lower half, but not her upper half, which was concealed in an upper chamber of the castle. As such it is said that the upper floors of the castle are haunted by the apparition of the upper half of her body and the lower floors and burial ground by the apparition of the lower part of her body.
- Pitfodels Castle, was to the south-west of Aberdeen, but little remains of the castle; it was replaced by Norwood Hall. The castle was originally held by the Reids but passed by marriage to the Menzies family in the sixteenth century. The Menzies family also held Pitfodel's Lodging, a house in Aberdeen that has also been demolished. Pitfodels Castle had been abandoned in about 1622. The Menzies of Pitfodels branch of the clan were also Jacobites and the family founded the Catholic College of Blairs.
- Culdares, near Fortingall, Perthshire, is the site of a castle or old house that was the seat of the Menzies of Culdares branch of the clan.

== Tartans ==
Image	Tartan Sett Name	Notes
	Menzies	This sett is woven in various colours with the same basic design. The red and green version is also known as the Green Menzies. A version of it has been adopted by the Auckland and District Pipe Band and is woven by Lochcarron of Scotland.
	Menzies #2	The pattern books of the old firm of weavers, Wilson's of Bannockburn, provide a reliable early source for this tartan. Wilson's were in business with a monopoly to supply tartan to the regiments in the second half of the 18th century before this pattern was recorded. Sample in Scottish Tartans Authority's Scarlett Collection. D.C. Stewart says that this is possible the oldest Menzies in existence but is rarely seen now (1950). He added that an earlier specimen had a pale green in place of the azure (light blue).
	Menzies of Culdares	Obtained from a Peter MacDonald swatch. Peter extracted the design from the original portrait at Castle Menzies. Peter Eslea MacDonald May 7
	Menzies 1938	From Robert Bain's book 1938. In 2006 it was regarded by the clan as its mourning tartan.
	Menzies 1815	The red and white Menzies tartan appears in the Cockburn Collection (c1815) under the name, MacFarlane, but this is taken to be an error on the part of General Cockburn at a time when the establishment of clan names for tartan was in its infancy. The same sett was certified as Menzies, by the clan chief, in the collection of the Highland Society of London (c.1816). The tartan is woven in various colours, green, black, red and white to the same design.
	Menzies #3	D.C. Stewart, 'The Setts of the Scottish Tartans' No: 196. Vestiarium Scoticum a book published 1842, the basis of a number of clan Tartans.
	Menzies Brown White	Sample from Scott Bros & Co Hawick also in Patons collection Book 4. Scottish Tartans Society archive.
	Menzies Dress Blue & White	Hugh MacPherson a retailer in Edinburgh. Scottish Tartans Society archive.
	Menzies Black Dress	D.C Dalgliesh a weaving firm in Selkirk.
	Menzies Hunting	From W & A K Johnston, 1906. This sett is woven in various colours with the same basic design. The certified version is red and black. The hunting Menzies was recorded by D.W. Stewart in his book, 'Old and Rare Scottish Tartans' (1893), which contained a selection of forty five setts, woven in silk, of special interest or antiquity.
	Menzies Green	In the MacGregor-Hastie collection, which is found in the Scottish Tartans Society archive.
	Menzies Mauve and White	Paton collection was in the Scottish Tartans Society archive, it has been returned to the Paton firm at Alloa.

== Bibliography ==
- Simpson, Peter. (1996). The Independent Highland Companies, 1603 - 1760. ISBN 0-85976-432-X.
