= Weem =

Coordinates: 56.625712°N 3.887391°W

Weem: Scottish Gaelic: Uaimh
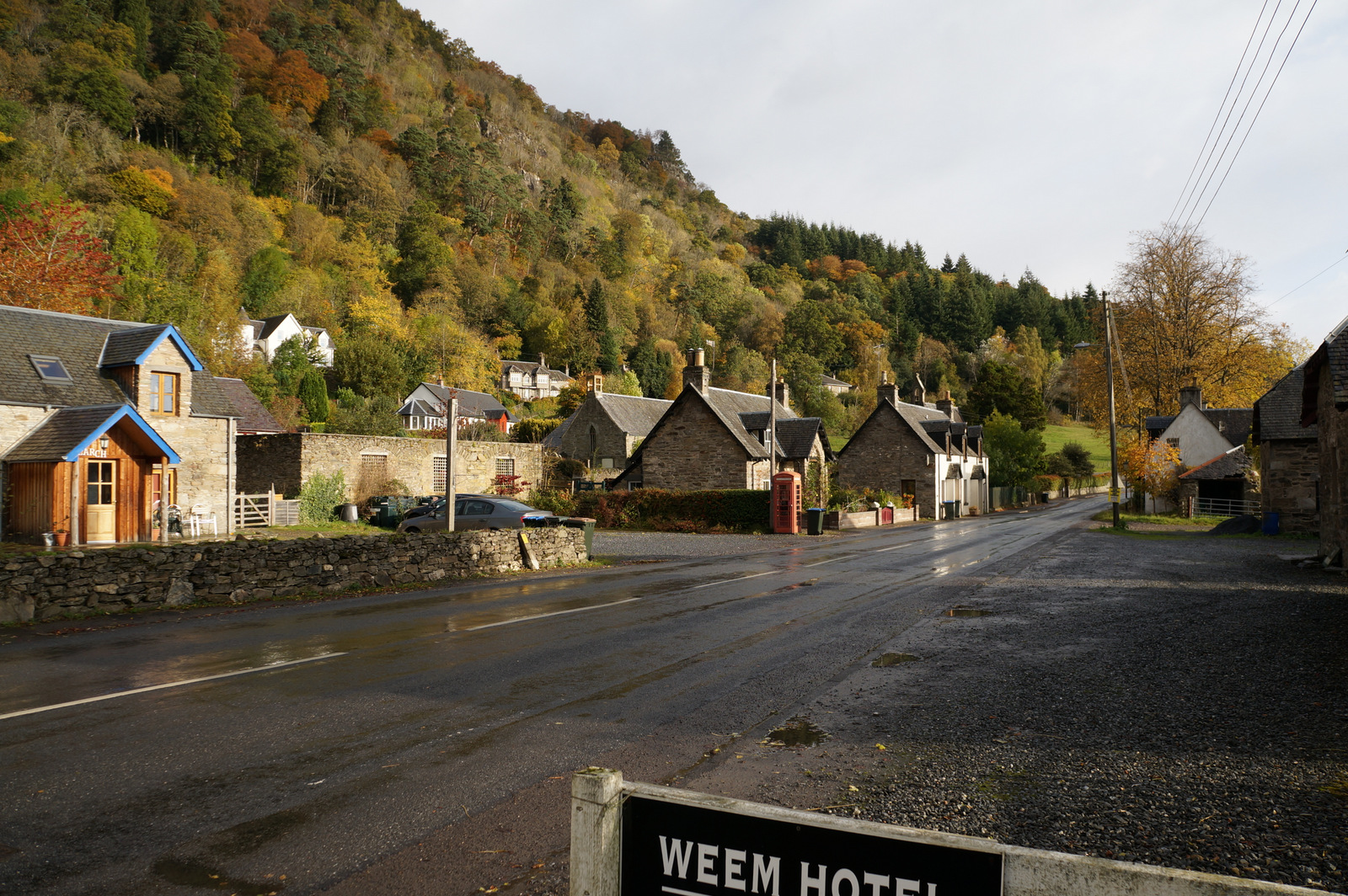

- Location within Perth and Kinross
- OS grid reference: NN843498
- Council area: Perth and Kinross
- Country: Scotland
- Sovereign state: United Kingdom
- Post town: ABERFELDY
- Postcode district: PH15
- Dialling code: 01887
- Police: Scotland
- Fire: Scottish
- Ambulance: Scottish
- UK Parliament: Angus and Perthshire Glens
- Scottish Parliament: Perthshire North

Weem (Scottish Gaelic: Uaimh) is a village on the B846 near Aberfeldy in Perthshire, Scotland. The name is derived from the Gaelic uamh, meaning "cave".

Nearby is Castle Menzies, one of Scotland's best-preserved 16th-century castles and the seat of Clan Menzies. Looked after by a private preservation trust, the castle and grounds are open to visitors in summer (with an entrance charge).

The Old Parish Church of Weem, of medieval origin, contains the funerary monuments of the Menzies family from the 16th century, and the heraldic hatchments carried at their funerals. The key is obtained from the neighbouring cottage. The present Weem Parish Church is Victorian in date.

There are two pubs in Weem, the Ailean Chraggan and the Weem Inn.

== Notable people ==
- Archibald Menzies (1754–1842), surgeon, botanist and naturalist, was born in Weem
