= Aberfeldy, Perth and Kinross =

Burgh in Perth and Kinross, Scotland

Aberfeldy: Scottish Gaelic: Obar Pheallaidh
- Town
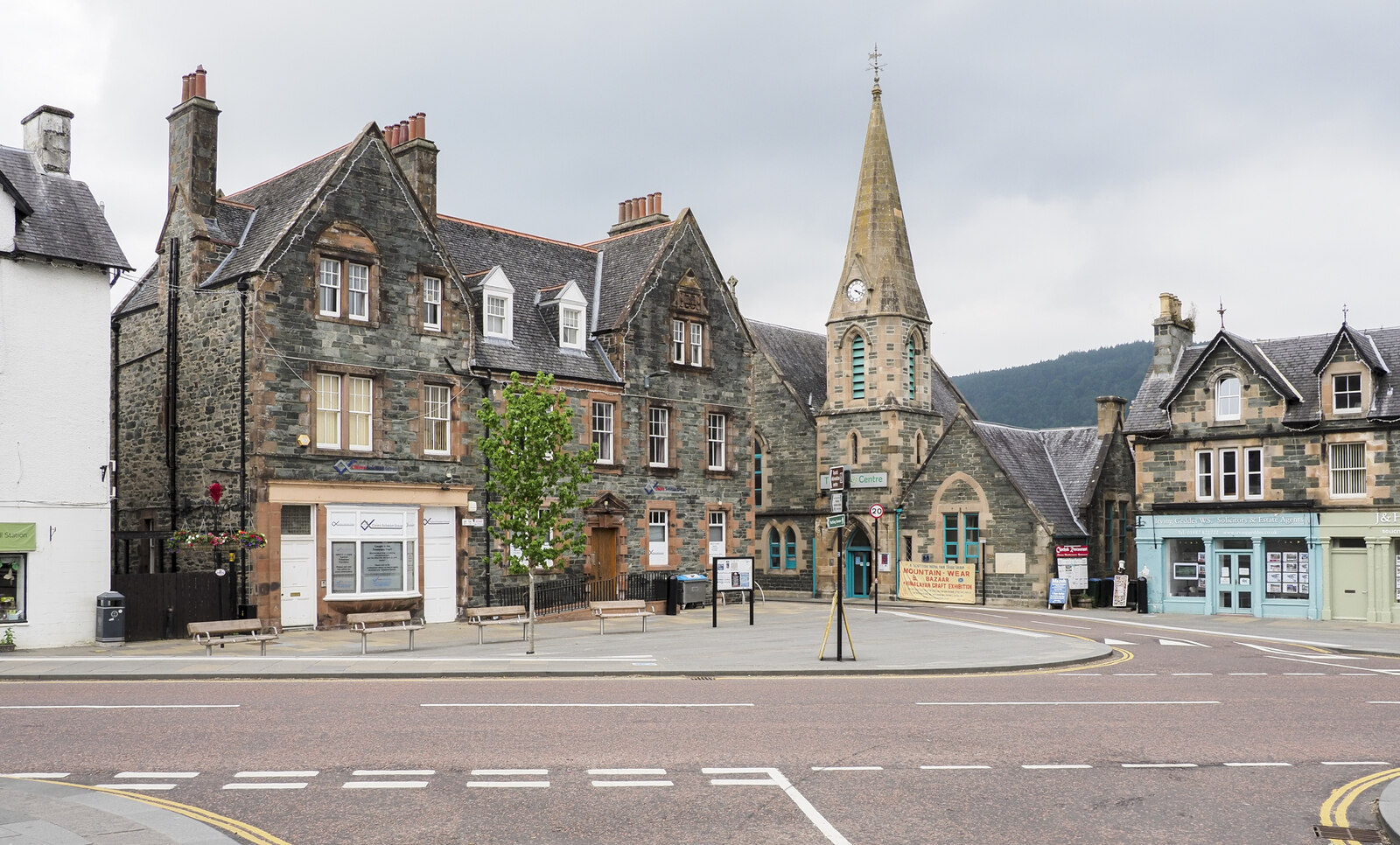
- Aberfeldy centre

- Location within Perth and Kinross
- Population: 1,886 (2022)
- OS grid reference: NN865496
  - Edinburgh: 53 mi (85 km)
  - London: 384 mi (618 km)
- Council area: Perth and Kinross
- Country: Scotland
- Sovereign state: United Kingdom
- Post town: ABERFELDY
- Postcode district: PH15
- Dialling code: 01887
- Police: Scotland
- Fire: Scottish
- Ambulance: Scottish
- UK Parliament: Angus and Perthshire Glens
- Scottish Parliament: Perthshire North

Aberfeldy (Scottish Gaelic: Obar Pheallaidh) is a historic market town and burgh in Perth and Kinross, Scotland, on the River Tay. It is located in Highland Perthshire, approximately 55 miles (85 km) west of Edinburgh, 57 miles (92 km) northeast of Glasgow, and 26 miles (42 km) northwest of Perth. It had a population of 1,886 in 2022.

Aberfeldy was mentioned by Robert Burns in the poem The Birks of Aberfeldy and in the Ed Sheeran song "The Hills of Aberfeldy".

== Etymology ==
Aberfeldy means 'mouth of the Peallaidh'. The first element of the name is the Pictish word aber 'river mouth'. The river-name perhaps incorporates the name of a water-sprite known as Peallaidh, which in Gaelic means 'shaggy'. Aberfeldy is recorded in 1526 as Abrefrally and in 1552 as Abirfeldy.

== History ==
=== Early history ===
Beyond its association with Burns, who mentioned Aberfeldy in his poem The Birks of Aberfeldy, the town is known for Wade's Bridge, built in 1733 and designed by architect William Adam, father of Robert Adam. General George Wade considered this bridge to be his greatest accomplishment. Aberfeldy is also mentioned in the traditional "Loch Tay Boat Song".

While working in the 1880s as a hired farmhand for Robert Menzies of Tirinie, near Aberfeldy, South Uist seanchaidh Angus MacLellan learned that a Mass stone had stood in the middle of Menzies's farmfield since the days when Catholic Church in Scotland and its priests were outlawed. A nearby high cross, Menzies added, marked the site of an important college of learning from the days of the Celtic Church. Menzies explained that, even though the local population had long since switched to Presbyterianism, former Catholic religious sites were still viewed with superstitious awe and were never tampered with. Menzies further explained that the term for Mass stones, in the Perthshire dialect of the Scottish Gaelic language, was Clachan Ìobairt, meaning "Offering Stones". John Lorne Campbell, to whom MacLellan dictated his memoirs, confirmed the latter's memories by interviewing Robert Menzies' descendants in Aberfeldy. Following Catholic emancipation in 1829, the Catholic population of Aberfeldy was served by priests visiting from Strathtay, who would offer the Tridentine Mass at the site now known as Tigh an Tuir, lit. "the house of the death-dirge". Since it was first built as a tin tabernacle paid for by the Marquess of Bute in 1884, Our Lady of Mercy Catholic Church has stood at the same location and has been part of the Roman Catholic Diocese of Dunkeld.

=== Contemporary history ===
Between 1960 and 1991, the burgh was the location of a Royal Observer Corps monitoring bunker, to be used in the event of a nuclear attack. It remains mostly intact.

The town includes a memorial to the Black Watch, a 9-hole golf course, a children's park, and a town square (laid out in 1806) which features stores, restaurants and art galleries. In 2002, Aberfeldy was granted Fairtrade Town status, which was renewed by the Fairtrade Foundation on 15 December 2003.

The Aberfeldy Footbridge over the River Tay is constructed entirely of composite materials. It initially connected two sections of the town's golf course on either side of the River Tay, but the course on the north side of the river has since been removed and the bridge is now used by pedestrians and cyclists to cross the river.

=== Baryte mining ===
The Precambrian Dalradian geological formations in the Highlands north of Aberfeldy contain substantial deposits of the mineral baryte, which is mostly used as a weighting agent for drilling fluids to prevent blow-outs in oil and gas exploration wells. There are three locations with exploitable quantities of it. The Foss Mine, some 4 miles (6 km) NW of Aberfeldy at 56°40′1.47″N 3°56′5.21″W has been operational since 1984 and production averages 50,000 tonnes per annum. So far some 525,000 tonnes have been extracted there by M-I SWACO. In 1990, a locally based company began opencast extraction near the summit of Ben Eagach, 4 miles (6 km) due north of Aberfeldy. Approximately 25,000 tonnes were mined from a series of small pits which have now been abandoned.

The largest formation, containing a 7.5-million-tonne reserve is at Duntanlich, some 6 miles (10 km) due north of Aberfeldy, south of Loch Tummel. In 1994, an application by MI Great Britain Ltd for an underground operation to mine the deposits was turned down. In 2000, M I Drilling Fluids UK unfolded new plans to establish a mine at Duntanlich to take six million tonnes from the deposit over the next 50 years and began preliminary talks with Perth & Kinross Council and Scottish Natural Heritage. However, it was decided at that time not to take these proposals forward.

== Geography ==
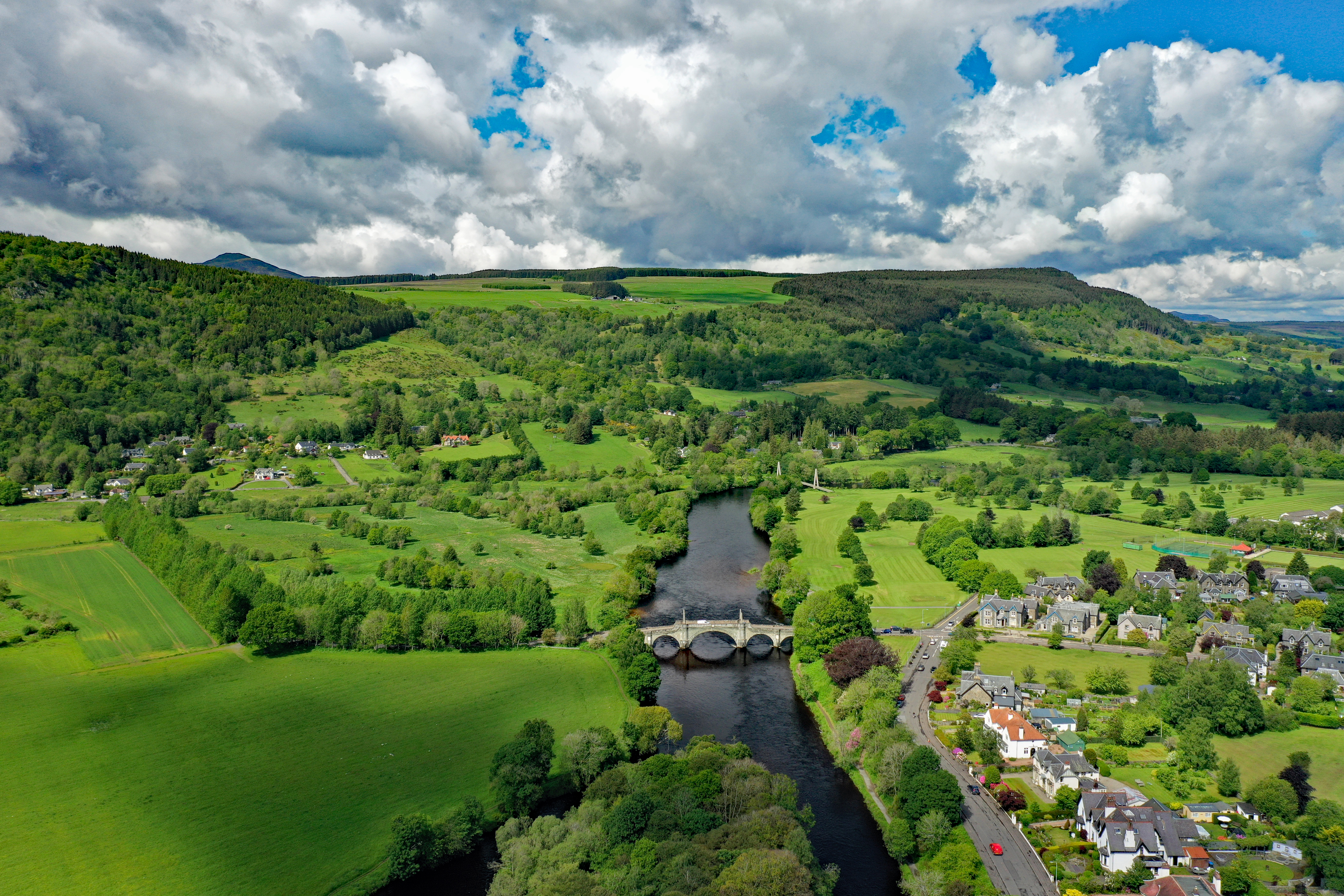
Aberfeldy Bridge

Aberfeldy is situated in Strath Tay on the upper reaches of the River Tay, which begins up-strath from Aberfeldy at Loch Tay and carries on south and east from Aberfeldy until it discharges at its estuary east of Perth at the Firth of Tay. Lying in an u-shaped strath common to Scotland's glaciated landscape, the terrain in and around Aberfeldy is gently undulating. Farming and agriculture border the town in the strath. Areas further outside of Aberfeldy (particularly to the north and west) give way to the extensive Grampian Mountains, with scenic peaks such as Creag Odhar, Farragon Hill, Schiehallion, Ben Lawers and Sron Mhor punctuating the landscape.

Aberfeldy lies at the intersection of two A roads, the A826 to Crieff and the A827, which leads east and south towards the main A9 trunk road. Aberfeldy is easily reached from southern locations by taking the A9 to the Ballinluig exit, then the A827 to get to the town. Owing to its location off the A9 trunk road, Aberfeldy is less geared toward tourists than its cousin Pitlochry.

From July 1865 until May 1965, the town was served by a Highland Railway branch from Ballinluig. Although most of the trackbed leading into the town is still extant, the site of the station has vanished under modern housing developments.

The entrance to the Birks of Aberfeldy – a gorge and scenic walk – lies on the southern outskirts of Aberfeldy on the A826. The Birks is classified as a "Site of Special Scientific Interest" and contains many varieties of flora and fauna, some of which are protected. Glen Lyon, regarded as one of Scotland's most stunning and least-visited glens, lies about 8 kilometres from the outskirts of Aberfeldy. Evidence of fort construction by Roman legions more than 1,600 years ago is a testament to the region's historical as well as geographical relevance. At the mouth of Glen Lyon lies the village of Fortingall, falsely claimed to be the birthplace of Pontius Pilate and home to the Fortingall Yew Tree, reputed to be more than 5,000 years old (though recent research suggests its age to be closer to 2,500).

== Demography and culture ==
=== Population ===
The Scottish Census of 2022 recorded the town's population as 1,886. According to the Perth and Kinross Council, Aberfeldy is forecasted to grow to over 2,800 by 2028.

=== Education ===
The town is home to Breadalbane Academy. Based in Aberfeldy since the nineteenth century, Breadalbane Academy is an all-through, mixed English and Gaelic-medium school catering to children from the ages of three to eighteen years. The nursery and primary departments serve pupils from Aberfeldy and its immediate surroundings. The secondary department is the main secondary school for the whole of Highland Perthshire. It is the primary centre for Gaelic-medium education in Highland Perthshire for children from Glenlyon, Grandtully, Kenmore, Kinloch Rannoch and Dunkeld all receive their secondary education in Aberfeldy. In fifth and sixth, pupils from the Pitlochry catchment area also attend Breadalbane Academy to study for their Highers and Advanced Highers.

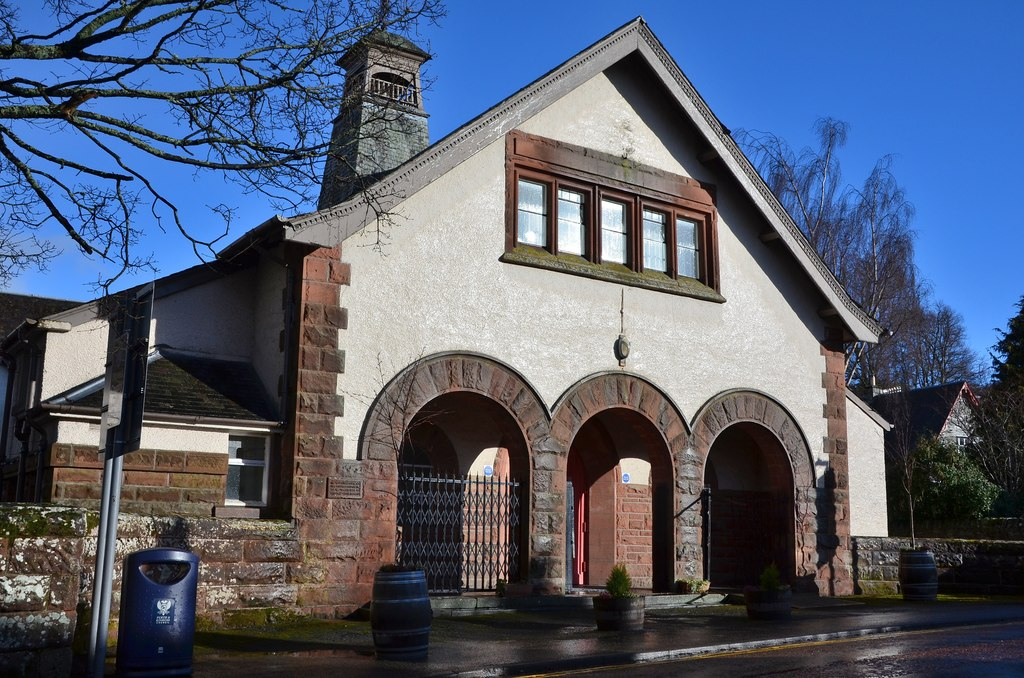
Aberfeldy Town Hall

Fully rebuilt in the early years of the twenty-first century, the school re-opened in December 2010 as a community campus. As well as nursery, primary and secondary departments, the new Breadalbane Community Campus includes a library, a swimming pool, squash courts, a gym, a cafe and a range of other facilities. These amenities are open to the public throughout the day. Only access to the school areas is restricted to authorised personnel.

=== Religion ===
Aberfeldy Parish Church meets in the former Breadalbane Church building in Taybridge Road, which was the first new building of the Free Church after the Disruption of 1843. It reunited with the former parish church, St Andrew's in Crieff Road, built in 1884, and for a while was used as halls for the united congregation, until 2005 when the Crieff Road building was closed and a modern interior and suite of halls was added to the Taybridge Road building, providing excellent facilities for adult and youth work. There is also a Roman Catholic parish in Home Street. The buildings formerly used as Congregational, Free, and Episcopal churches are now all used for other purposes. Jehovah's Witnesses meet in the local Kingdom Hall. The town is also home to the award-winning Aberfeldy Watermill Bookshop Gallery and Cafe.

=== Sport ===
Breadalbane Cricket Club, founded in 1869, play home matches at Victoria Park in Aberfeldy. The team are the Perthshire Cup Winners for 2007 and 2008, and Strathmore Cricket Union Division One Champions in 2006 & 2007, Division Two Champions in 2014 & 2018, and Perthshire Indoor League Champions 2013, 2017, 2018, 2019 and 2020. The town also has a rugby union side Aberfeldy RFC that plays in the Caledonia Midlands Division Three league at the town's Wade Park.

=== Culture ===
Aberfeldy does not have a theatre or a music hall. However it does have two community venues, used regularly for music and drama, Aberfeldy Town Hall and the Locus Centre. These are managed by Locus Breadalbane, a community charity. The nearest venues are the Pitlochry Festival Theatre, the Perth Theatre or the Perth Concert Hall. The new Community School has an auditorium.

The Birks Cinema, built in 1939 in a late Art Deco style, closed in the early 1980s for lack of business. It then turned into an amusement hall, for which purpose the entire interior was demolished. The amusement hall closed in 2004 and the building stood as an empty shell for several years. In 2009 it was bought by the "Friends of the Birks" with a grant from the Scottish Government's Town Centre Regeneration Fund with plans to refurbish and reopen as a new 92-seat cinema and café-bar. The Friends are now a formal company limited by guarantee and registered as a charity. In spring 2011, the Birks project was awarded £658,520 by the Scotland Rural Development Programme - half the sum needed to carry out the building work. Match funding for the SRDP grant has now been raised - notably through a Big Lottery grant of £539,950 announced on 9 February 2012. Building work began in April 2012 and opened in Spring 2013. The patron of the project is the actor Alan Cumming, who was born in the town.

Aberfeldy is the location of the poem "The Birks of Aberfeldy" by Robert Burns:

Bonie lassie, will ye go,
Will ye go, will ye go,
Bonie lassie, will ye go
To the birks of Aberfeldy!

Now Simmer blinks on flowery braes,
And o'er the crystal streamlets plays;
Come let us spend the lightsome days,
In the birks of Aberfeldy!

In 2001, the author J.K. Rowling purchased the nearby 19th-century Killiechassie House, on the banks of the River Tay.

Aberfeldy is also home to the Aberfeldy distillery.

== Namesake ==
Aberfeldie, the suburb of Melbourne, Victoria, Australia was named, indirectly, after the town, as was the locality of Aberfeldy, Victoria.

== Gallery ==
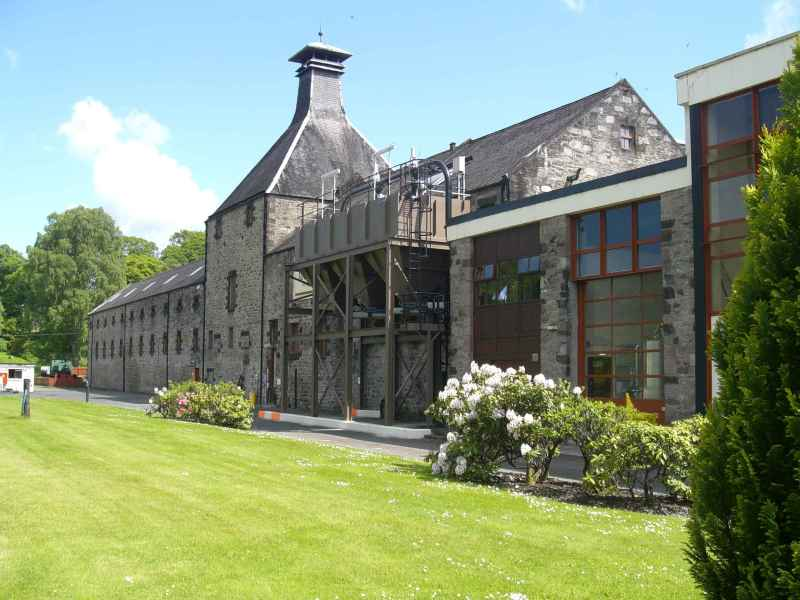
Aberfeldy Distillery

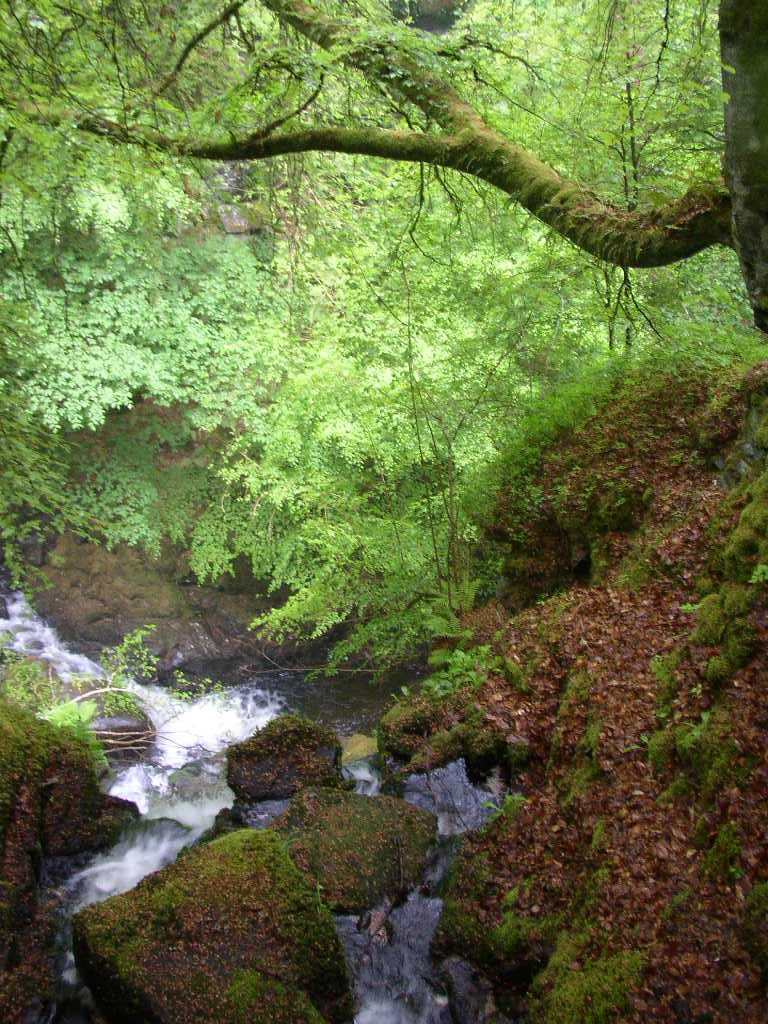
The Birks of Aberfeldy

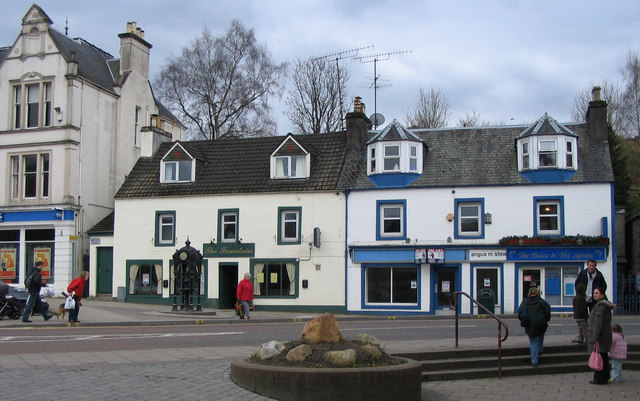
Aberfeldy square

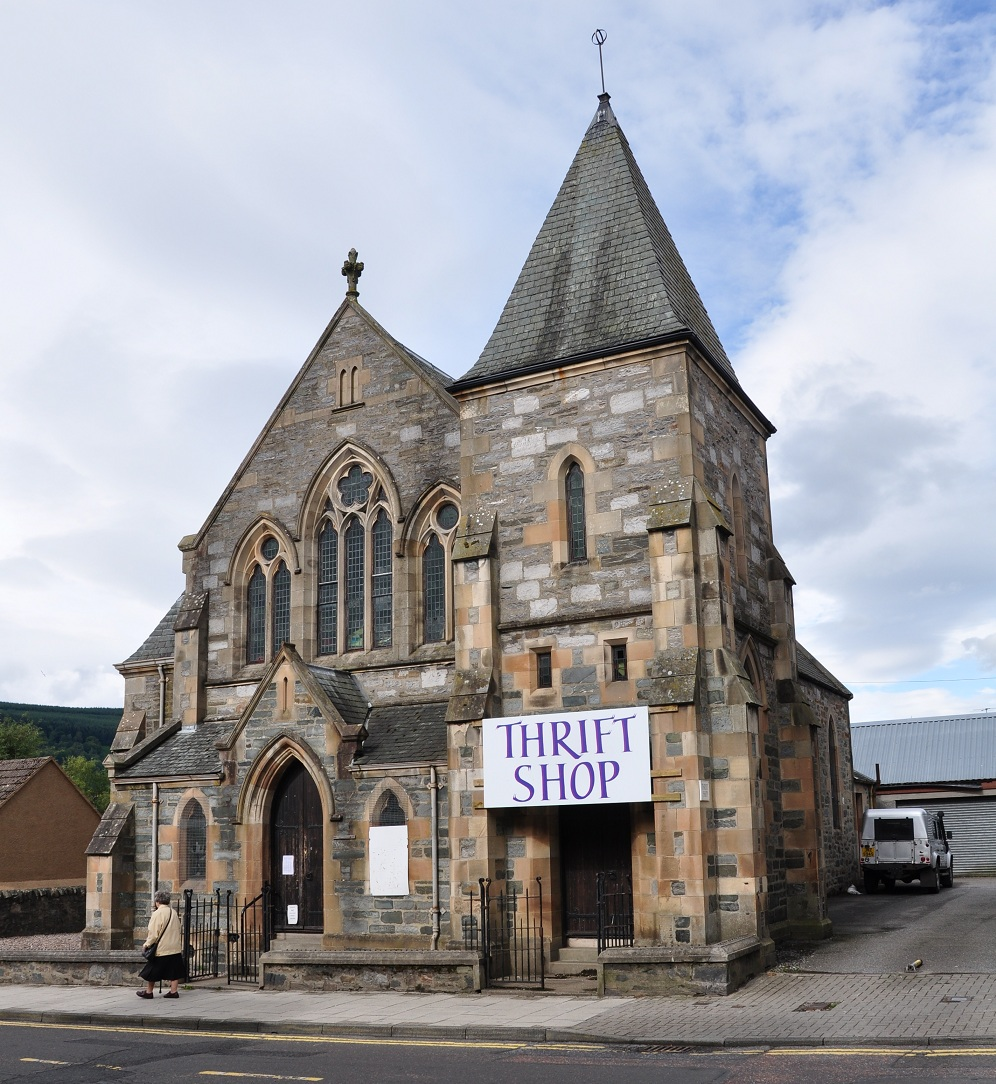
The 'Auld Kirk', now a thrift shop

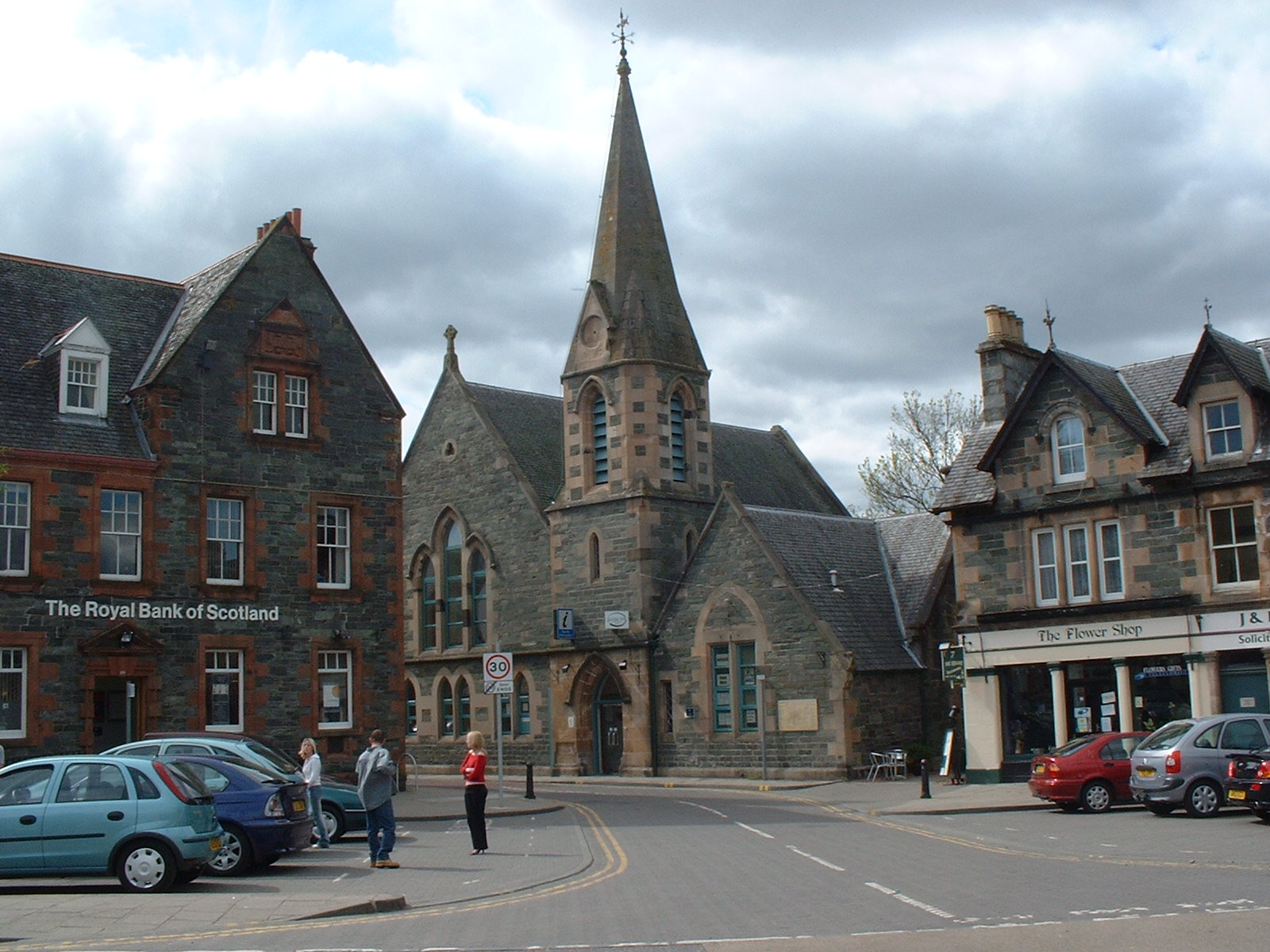
Aberfeldy, town centre

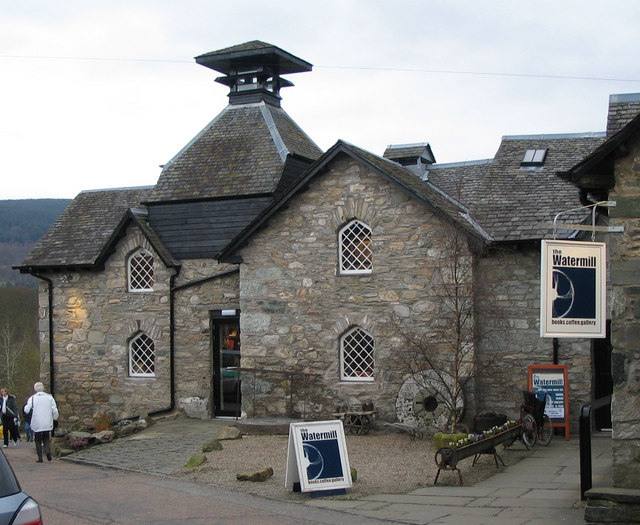
The old water mill, now a bookshop

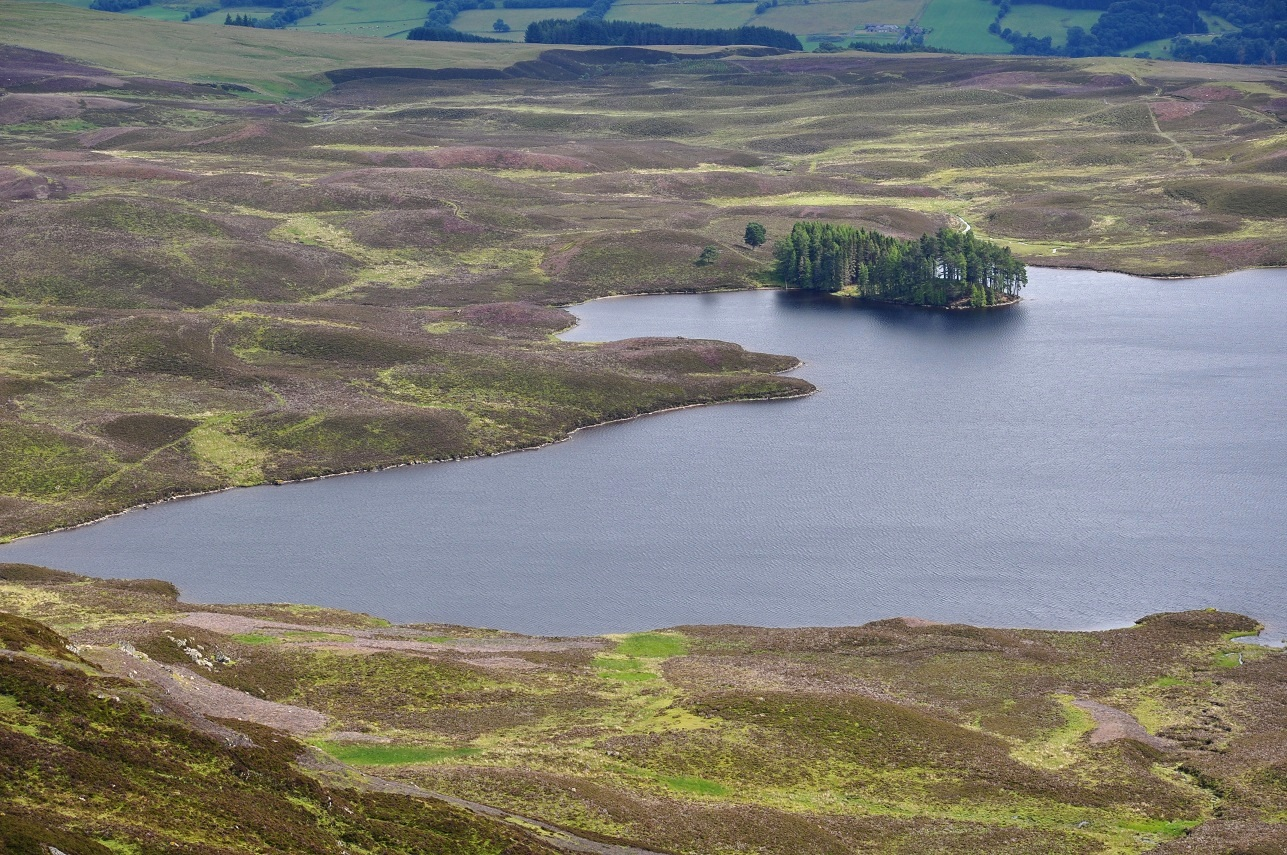
Loch Derculich, north of Aberfeldy

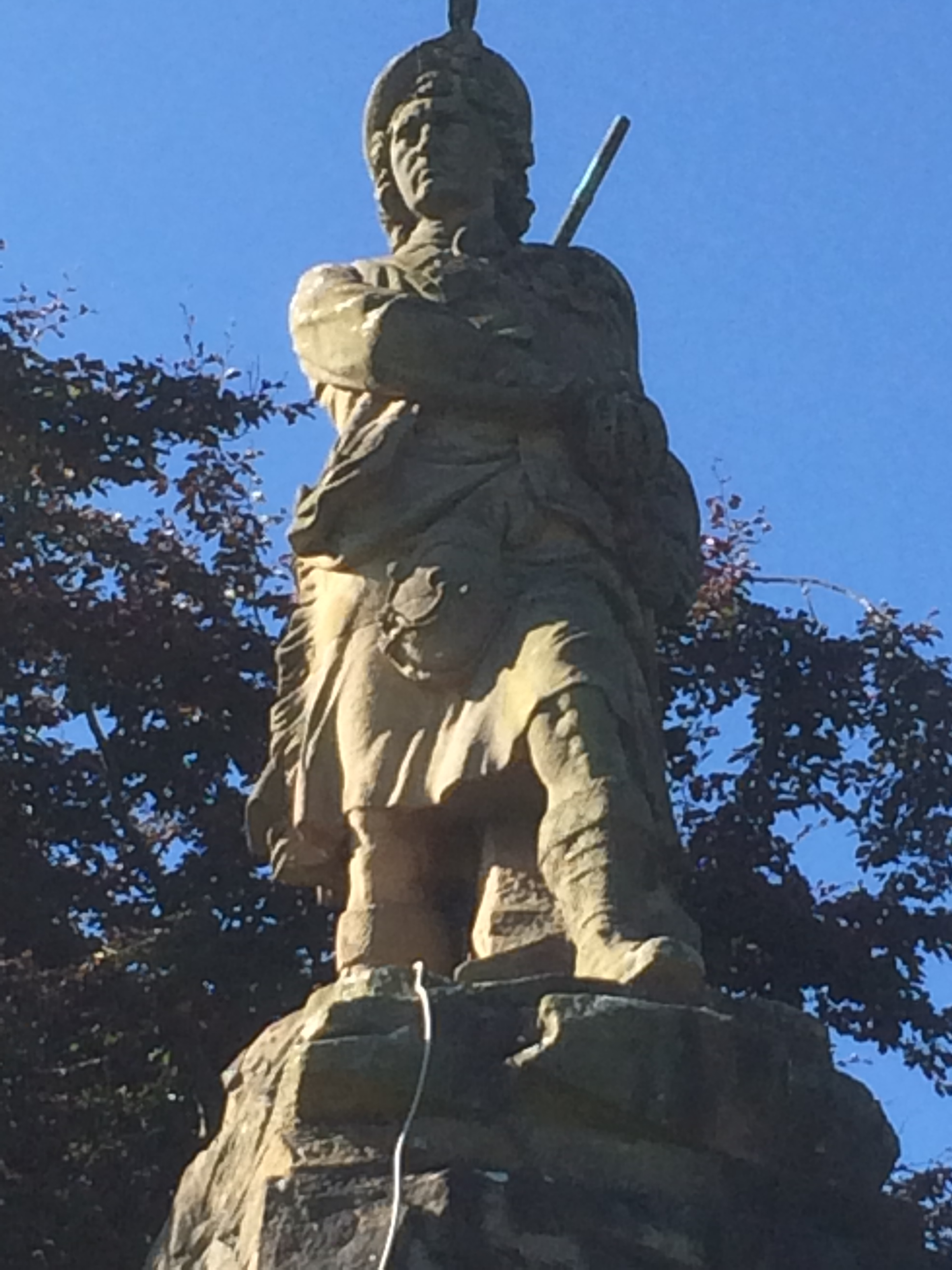
Black Watch Monument

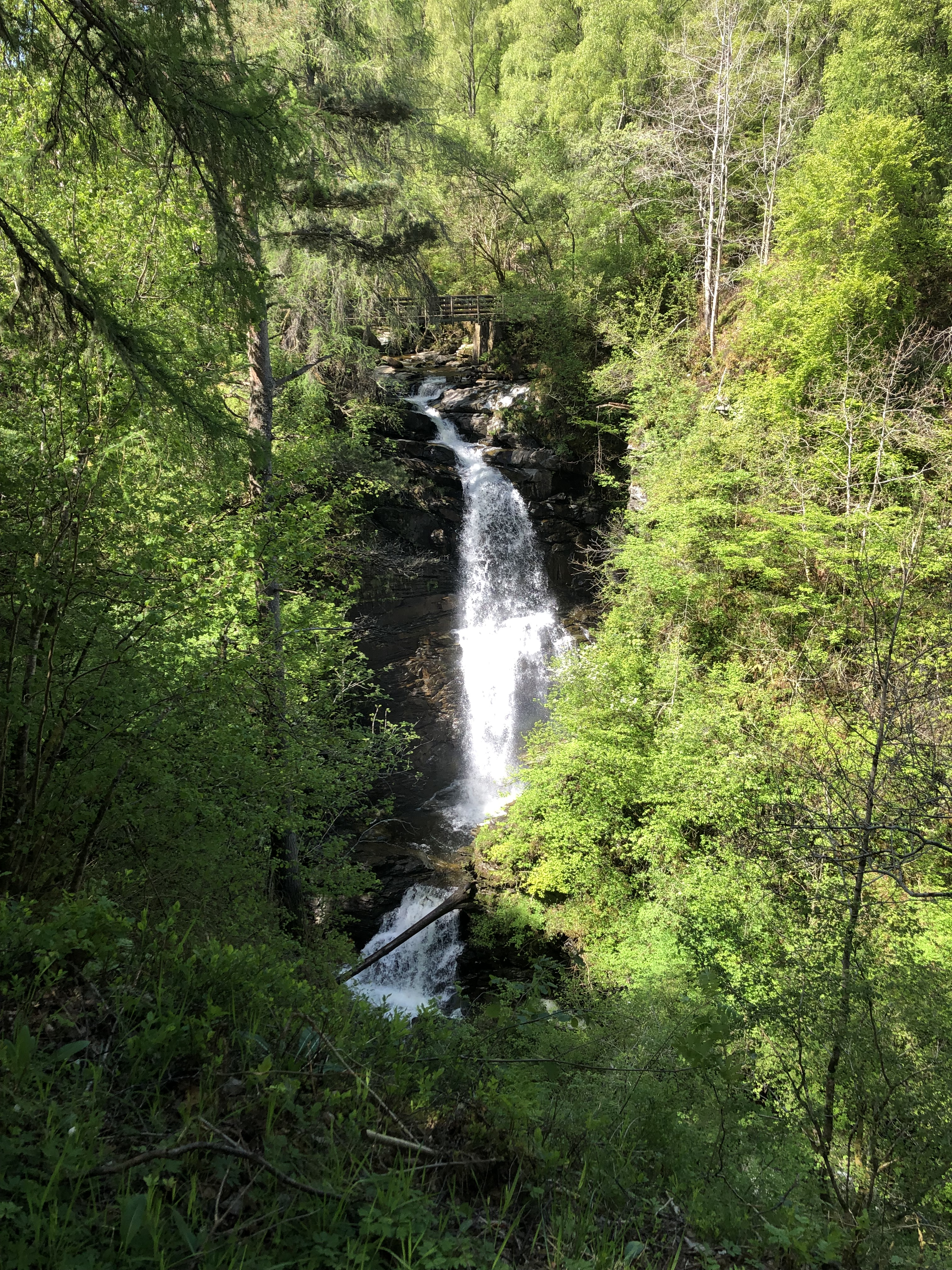
Falls of Moness at the Birks of Aberfeldy

== See also ==
- List of places in Perth and Kinross
