= Carberry =

Carberry may refer to:

- Carberry (surname), includes list of notable people with the name
- Carberry, Manitoba, town in Canada; site of:—
  - RCAF Station Carberry, Second World War air training station
- Carberry, East Lothian, town in Scotland; site of:—
  - Carberry Tower, historic house
  - Battle of Carberry Hill, 1567 battle leading to the abdication of Mary, Queen of Scots

== See also ==
- Carbery (disambiguation)
