= Rural Municipality of North Cypress =

Coordinates: 49°54′33″N 99°22′41″W

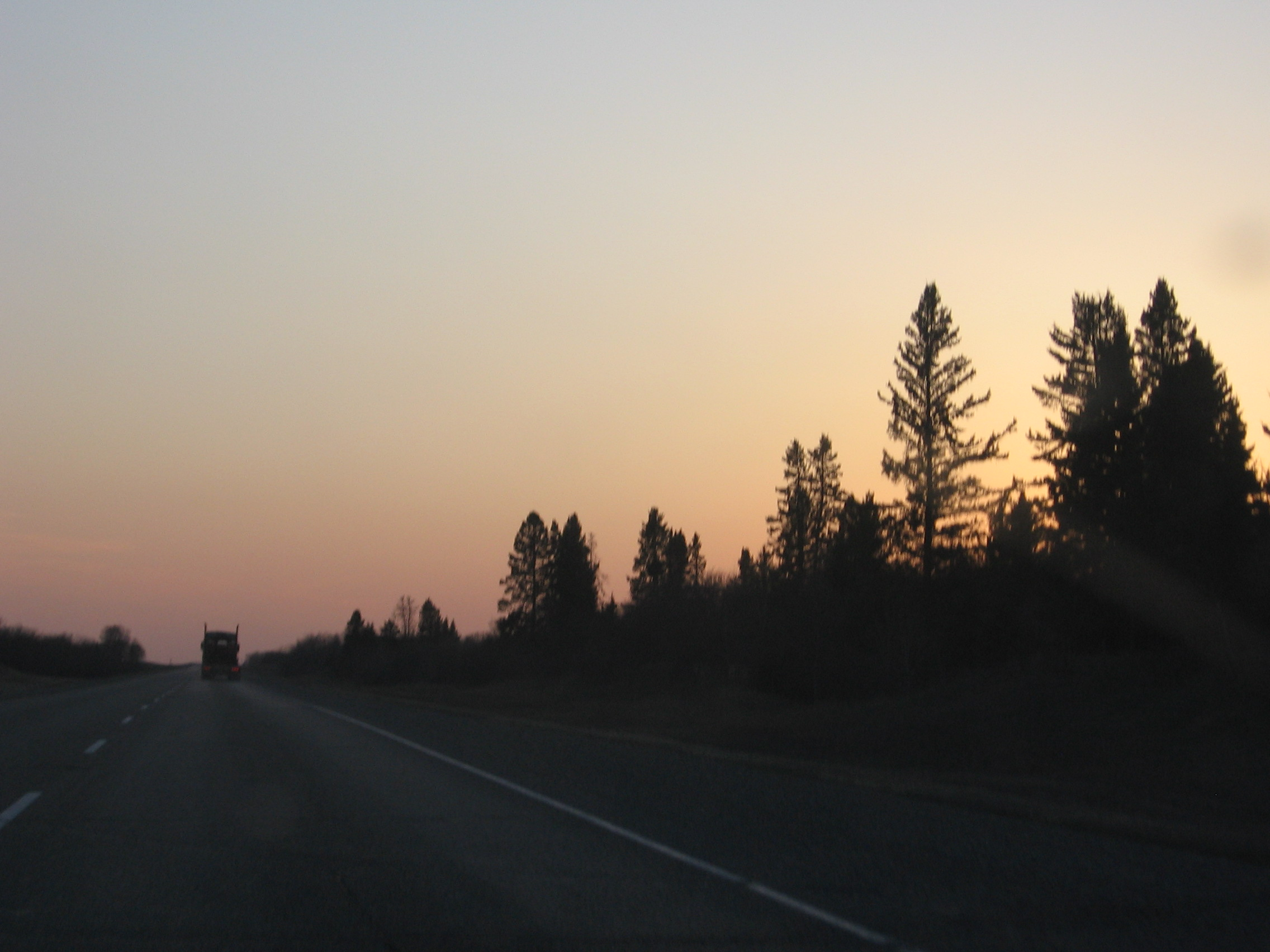
- Heading west on the Trans Canada Highway through North Cypress near Carberry
- Nickname: "King Spud Country"
- Interactive map of Rural Municipality of North Cypress
- Country: Canada
- Province: Manitoba
- Region: Westman

Government
  - Reeve: Ralph Oliver
  - Council: North Cypress municipal council
  - MLA Turtle Mountain: Doyle Piwniuk (PC)
  - MP Brandon—Souris: Grant Jackson (CON)

Area
  - Land: 1,199.92 km^{2} (463.29 sq mi)

Population (2011)
  - Total: 1,860
  - Density: 1.6/km^{2} (4.1/sq mi)
- Time zone: UTC−06:00 (CST)
  - Summer (DST): UTC−05:00 (CDT)
- Postal code: R0K
- Area code: 204
- Website: R.M. of North Cypress

The Rural Municipality of North Cypress is a former rural municipality (RM) in the Canadian province of Manitoba. It was originally incorporated as a rural municipality on January 1, 1883. It ceased on January 1, 2015 as a result of its provincially mandated amalgamation with the RM of Langford to form the Municipality of North Cypress – Langford.

As of 2011, the population of the former RM of North Cypress is 1,860.

== Overview ==
The former RM of North Cypress is located in the Westman region of the province between Brandon and Portage la Prairie. It surrounds the independently governed Town of Carberry and includes the unincorporated communities of Brookdale, Wellwood and Edrans. Also located in the former RM of North Cypress are the Acadia, Fairway and Riverbend Hutterite colonies. The former RM has connections to the Trans Canada Highway (which runs directly through North Cypress), as well as Highway 5 and PR 351.

=== Communities ===
- Brookdale
- Edrans
- Fairview
- Firdale
- Gregg
- Harte
- Ingelow
- Melbourne
- Oberon
- Onah
- Petrel
- Pleasant Point
- Shilo
- Wellwood

== Economy ==
The former RM's economy benefits from its location along the Trans Canada Highway as well as access to both the Canadian Pacific and Canadian National rail lines, close proximity to Brandon and direct route to Winnipeg. The former RM is set upon rich sandy soil, and is widely known for potatoes which are grown by local farming operations. The former RM is also known for forests of spruce, poplar and aspen oak trees, and the Carberry sandhills. It is also home to several major employers including McCain Foods and ADM Agri Industries. The Manitoba Crop Diversification Centre (MCDC) is also located in the former RM of North Cypress.

== Services ==
Emergency services are provided by the Royal Canadian Mounted Police, the Carberry/North Cypress Fire Department, and the Carberry & District Health Centre.

Schools are overseen by the Beautiful Plains School Division, and include R.J. Waugh Elementary School and Carberry Collegiate Institute in Carberry, Brookdale Elementary School in Brookdale, and several small Hutterite colony schools located on the Acadia, Fairway and Riverbend Hutterite colonies.

== Wildlife ==
The area is home to many species of wildlife including some protected and endangered species. White-tailed deer, moose, elk, great horned owl, snowy owl, gray wolf, canadian lynx, peregrine falcon, coyote, and the rare skink are a few of the animal species that are found within the former RM. Although not common, American black bears, bobcats and cougars are also routinely spotted in the area.

Because of the unique ecosystem and large forests, there are several large parcels of Crown land and protected land areas within the former RM of North Cypress, including a large part of the Spruce Woods Provincial Forest, and a small part of Spruce Woods Provincial Park.

== Military ==
The former RM was home to two major Canadian Forces installations, Camp Hughes and RCAF Station Carberry.

== See also ==
- Camp Hughes
- RCAF Station Carberry
