= Peig Ryan =

Irish musician (1923–2026)

Peig Ryan Pheig Uí Riain

Background information
- Born: Peig Carberry; April 14, 1923; County Limerick, Ireland
- Died: January 10, 2026 (aged 102) St Anthony’s Nursing Home, Pallasgreen, County Limerick, Ireland
- Genres: Irish traditional music
- Occupation: Music teacher
- Spouse: Mick Ryan

Peig Ryan (née Carberry; 14 April 1923 – 10 January 2026), also known as Peg Ryan, was an Irish traditional musician and music teacher. She founded a Comhaltas Ceoltóirí Éireann branch in County Limerick, which was renamed in her honour in 2023. She died in St Anthony’s Nursing Home, Pallasgreen on 10 January 2026.

== Career ==
On 14 April 1972, Ryan founded a Comhaltas Ceoltóirí Éireann branch in the Cappamore-Murroe area called Craobh Maigh Rua - An Cheapach Mhór, which was renamed Craobh Pheig Uí Riain in her honour on the branch's 50th anniversary in 2023, on the same day as Ryan's 100th birthday.

In August 2023, she participated in Music Speaks, a musical event where residents of nursing homes performed music, coinciding with Nursing Homes Ireland's Nursing Homes Week.

== Personal life ==
Ryan was born in the Rath-Murroe-Cappamore area of County Limerick on 14 April 1923.

She died on 10 January 2026 at the age of 103 in St Anthony’s Nursing Home in Pallasgreen, County Limerick, Ireland. She was reposed at Meehan's Funeral Home on 13 January. The next day, a requiem mass was held in the Holy Rosary Church, Murroe, and she was buried in the Doon Cemetery.
