= Carberry (surname) =

Carberry is a surname. Notable people with the surname include:

- John Vaughan, 1st Earl of Carberry (1574/5–1634), Welsh courtier and politician
- Anne Vaughan, Countess of Carberry (1663–1690), a daughter of George Savile, 1st Marquess of Halifax, and his first wife,
- Bert Carberry (1931–?), Scottish footballer
- Chris Carberry (born 1951), Australian rugby union player
- Ed Carberry (born 1953/54), American football coach
- Glen Carberry (1896–1976), American football player
- John Carberry (1904–1998), Cardinal Archbishop of Saint Louis
- Joseph E. Carberry (1887–1961), American aviator
- Joseph Carberry (Wisconsin politician) (1853–1928), Wisconsin state legislator
- Kay Carberry (born 1950), British trade unionist
- Larry Carberry (1936–2015), English footballer
- Matthew Carberry (1911–1986), American sheriff
- Michael Carberry (born 1980), English cricketer
- Michael Carberry (rugby league), Australian former professional rugby league footballer
- Michael J. Carberry, American politician
- Nina Carberry (born 1984), Irish jockey and politician
- Paul Carberry (born 1974), Irish jockey
- Tommy Carberry (1941–2017), Irish jockey

Fictional characters:

- Josiah S. Carberry, fictional professor of psychoceramics at Brown University and Wesleyan University

== See also ==
- Carbery (disambiguation)
