= Beautiful Plains School Division =

School district in Manitoba, Canada

The Beautiful Plains School Division is a rural school Division in Manitoba, Canada, with two major centers in Neepawa and Carberry. The division is located west of Winnipeg and east of Brandon and spans and area approximately 50 miles (80 km) long and 20 miles (32 km) wide. The division office is located in Neepawa. It is overseen by a board of 7 elected trustees.

Beautiful Plains School Division is responsible for several public schools as well as several Hutterite colony schools.

== Schools in Beautiful Plains School Division ==
School	Level	Location
Brookdale Elementary	Elementary (K–6)	Brookdale, Manitoba
J.M. Young	Elementary (K–8)	Eden, Manitoba
R.J. Waugh	Elementary (K–4)	Carberry, Manitoba
Hazel M. Kellington	Elementary (K–4)	Neepawa, Manitoba
Neepawa Middle School	Middle School (5-8)	Neepawa‚ Manitoba
Carberry Collegiate (C.C.I.)	High School (5–12)	Carberry, Manitoba
Neepawa Area Collegiate (N.A.C.I.)	High School (9–12)	Neepawa, Manitoba
Acadia Colony School	(K–12)	Acadia Hutterite Colony
Fairway Colony School	(K–12)	Fairway Hutterite Colony
Riverside Colony School	(K–12)	Riverside Hutterite Colony
Riverbend Colony School	(K–12)	Riverbend Hutterite Colony
Rolling Acres Colony School	(K–12)	Rolling Acres Hutterite Colony
Sprucewoods Colony School	(K–12)	Sprucewoods Hutterite Colony
Twilight Colony School	(K–12)	Twilight Hutterite Colony
Willerton School	(K–-12)	Springhill Hutterite Colony

== See also ==
List of school districts in Manitoba
