= Carberry, East Lothian =

Village in East Lothian, Scotland

Coordinates: 55.918°N 3.028°W

Carberry
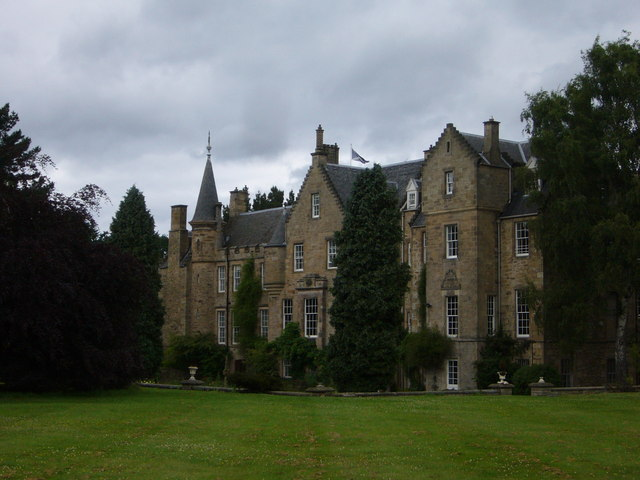
- Carberry Tower

- Location within Scotland
- OS grid reference: NT358699
  - Edinburgh: 8 mi (12.9 km) SE
  - London: 370 mi (600 km) SSE
- Civil parish: Inveresk
- Council area: East Lothian Council
- Lieutenancy area: East Lothian
- Country: Scotland
- Sovereign state: United Kingdom
- Post town: MUSSELBURGH
- Postcode district: EH21
- Dialling code: 0131
- Police: Scotland
- Fire: Scottish
- Ambulance: Scottish
- UK Parliament: East Lothian
- Scottish Parliament: East Lothian

Carberry is a village in East Lothian, Scotland, United Kingdom, situated off the A6124 road, a mile east of Whitecraig, two miles south east of Musselburgh, and 2 miles north east of Dalkeith.

On 20 September 1745 Charles Edward Stuart set off from Duddingston with his troops via Carberry to meet the Hanoverian army for the Battle of Prestonpans.

== Carberry Tower ==
The 15th-century Carberry Tower is a historic house owned by the Scottish charity Gartmore House. It was previously owned by the Elphinstone family. The late Lady Elphinstone, sister of Queen Elizabeth the Queen Mother, gifted the building to the Church of Scotland.

== Battle of Carberry Hill ==
In June 1567, Mary, Queen of Scots, surrendered to the rebel confederation after the Battle of Carberry Hill, the start of her imprisonment which was to continue for 20 years.

A monument was erected on the estate of the Dukes of Buccleuch, with the legend "M.R. 1567 At this spot Mary, Queen of Scots, after the escape of Bothwell mounted her horse and surrendered herself to the Confederate Lords 15 June 1567".
