= Cairbre =

Cairbre (Cairpre, Coirpre) is a name of historical significance in medieval Irish culture, attributed to various figures in both mythology and history. Some notable individuals associated with the name include:

- Cairbre, son of Ogma, celebrated as a poet and satirist among the Tuatha Dé Danann
- Cairbre Nia Fer, a legendary king of Tara
- Cairbre Cuanach, a renowned Ulster warrior in mythology
- Cairbre Cinnchait, a legendary 1st-century usurper High King of Ireland
- Cairbre Lifechair, a 3rd-century High King of Ireland
- Coirpre mac Néill, son of Niall of the Nine Hostages and the eponymous founder of the Cenél Coirpri, associated with the barony of Carbury in County Kildare
- Three sons of Conaire Cóem: Cairpre Músc, Cairpre Baschaín, and Cairpre Riata
- Coirpre Cromm mac Crimthainn, a Munster king

== Places ==
- Carbery (disambiguation), the anglicized spelling of places named Cairbre or similar in Irish
