= Carberry, Manitoba =

Town in Manitoba, Canada

Carberry
- Town
- Town of Carberry
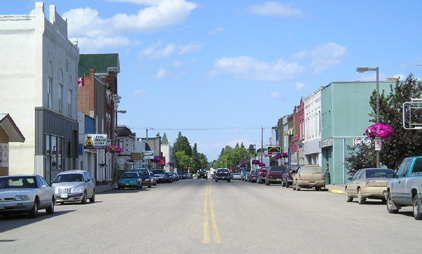
- Main Street in Carberry, 2007

- Town boundaries

- Location in Manitoba
- Coordinates: 49°52′08″N 99°21′34″W
- Country: Canada
- Province: Manitoba
- Region: Westman
- Incorporated: 1882

Government
  - Mayor: Ray Muirhead
  - MLA Agassiz: Jodie Byram (PC)
  - MP Brandon-Souris: Grant Jackson (CON)

Area
  - Total: 4.80 km^{2} (1.85 sq mi)
- Elevation: 409 m (1,342 ft)

Population (2021)
  - Total: 1,818
  - Density: 379/km^{2} (981/sq mi)
- Time zone: UTC-6 (Central (CST))
  - Summer (DST): UTC-5 (Central (CDT))
- Postal code: R0K 0H0
- Area code: 204
- Website: townofcarberry.ca

Carberry is a town in Westman Region of Manitoba, Canada. It is situated 3 kilometres (1.9 mi) south of the Trans-Canada Highway on Highway 5 in the Municipality of North Cypress – Langford, and has a population of 1,818 people.

== History ==
=== Early history ===
In the late 1760s, a small fur trading post called Pine Fort was established by independent fur traders from Montreal, south of Carberry's present site in what is now Spruce Woods Provincial Park along the Assiniboine River. At that time, a diverse group of Native peoples were travelling through the area and harvesting rich crops of beaver and other furs. Early fur trade accounts indicate that the Sioux from the south, resident Cree and Assiniboine, and eastern groups such as Saulteaux, Ottawa and various Ojibwa bands were all trading or hunting in the area. Pine Fort was later taken over by the North West Company, and was eventually abandoned in 1811.

Native peoples continued to pass through or reside in the Carberry area and did so until the late 1870s when European settlement began to affect the landscape and game resources. The Native population in the area was eventually settled onto reserves according to treaty provisions with the Federal Government of Canada.

=== Founding and incorporation ===
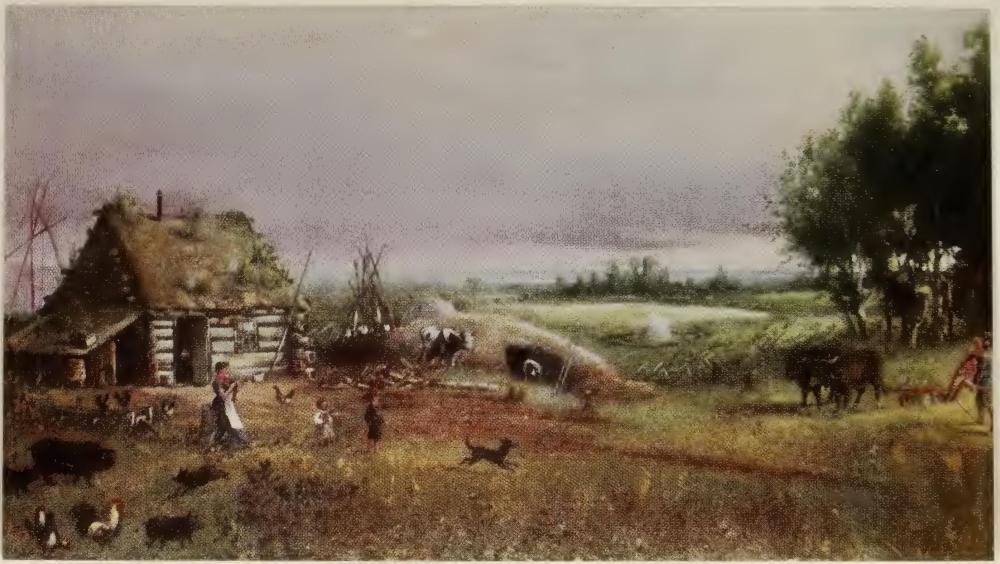
A painting of a settlers home near Carberry, 1884.

Carberry was founded in 1882. It was originally settled primarily by settlers from Eastern Canada of British origin, and was named after the Carberry Tower located near Musselburgh, Scotland. In 1905, Carberry was incorporated as a town.

==== Canadian Pacific Railway ====
As is the case with most towns in the southern districts of Western Canada, Carberry owes its origin mainly to the Canadian Pacific Railway. In 1882, the railway established a station at De Winton, a now defunct town-site about 3.5 kilometres (2.2 mi) east of Carberry's present site. Several railway officials covertly purchased much of De Winton's town-site property, hoping for large personal profits as a town grew around this new station. This kind of speculation was strictly against the CPR's company rules, and on discovering the violation, the company decided to have the newly built station moved in one piece to the present site of the town of Carberry, and specially hired 100 men for the job. This extensive operation was conducted secretly in the middle of the night and was completed in less than 12 hours. When the station reached its new location, the town of Carberry was born. Carberry quickly grew into a prosperous town and was an important stop along the CPR. The CPR main line route runs through Carberry to this day; however, the passenger train station has since been removed.

==== Trans Canada Highway ====
The Trans Canada Highway, another major national transportation route, originally passed directly through the town of Carberry, and remained that way until the late 1950s when the route was changed to allow the road to be upgraded to a 4-lane divided high-speed highway. Many businesses were established in Carberry to service the heavy traffic on that original highway, many of which still exist. Today the Trans Canada Highway passes 3 kilometres (1.9 mi) north of Carberry, and the older route directly through town is Provincial Road 351 (known as 1st Avenue inside the town limits).

On June 15, 2023, a serious vehicle collision between a handi-transit bus and a semi-truck occurred on the Trans Canada Highway near Carberry, killing 17 people and injuring 8 others.

=== Military history ===
==== Camp Hughes ====
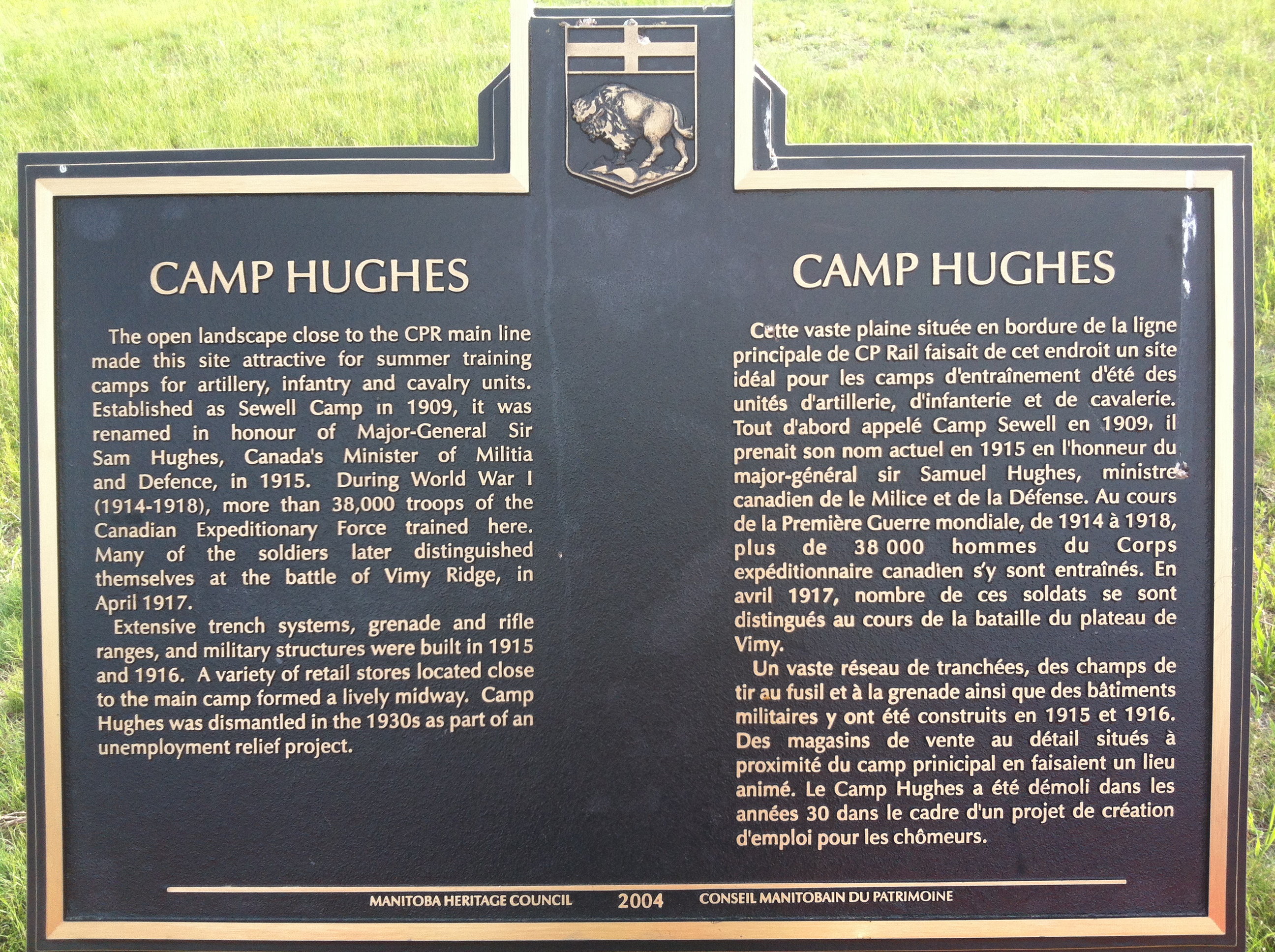
Camp Hughes Designation Sign

In 1909, a military training camp named "Camp Sewell" was established 10 kilometres (6.2 mi) west of Carberry along what is now PR 351 on the south side of the Canadian Pacific Railway line. The name of the camp was changed in 1915 to "Camp Hughes" in honour of Major-General Sir Sam Hughes, Canada's Minister of Militia and Defence at the time. The soldiers and support staff stationed at Camp Hughes naturally maintained very close social and economic ties with the town of Carberry which was only a short distance away. Extensive trench systems, grenade and rifle ranges, and military structures were built at Camp Hughes between 1915 and 1916, and a variety of retail stores and entertainment complexes on a double-avenued area close to the main camp formed a lively commercial midway. During World War I, more than 38,000 troops of the Canadian Expeditionary Force trained at the camp, giving it the largest population in the province of Manitoba outside of the capital city, Winnipeg. Many of the soldiers who were trained at the camp were involved in the infamous Battle of Vimy Ridge. The military continued to train soldiers at Camp Hughes until 1934, when troops were moved to CFB Shilo and CFB Winnipeg for financial and logistical reasons. Camp Hughes has been designated as a Provincial Heritage Site, and although the site is no longer active, it is still monitored by the Canadian Department of National Defense.

There is a roadside park named "Camp Hughes Wayside Park" located 13 kilometres (8.1 mi) west of Carberry on the Trans Canada Highway near the west intersection with PR 351, a short distance north of the actual Camp Hughes site, named in honour of the military camp.

==== RCAF Station Carberry ====
In December 1940, troops of the Royal Air Force arrived in Carberry and established the Service Flying Training School Number 33 (known as RCAF Station Carberry) just south of the town, to train military pilots as part of the vast British Commonwealth Air Training Plan. Thousands of military personnel from the United Kingdom, Canada and other Commonwealth countries were moved to Carberry for flight training. The flight training school was shut down at the end of World War II, and a McCain Foods processing facility is now on that site.

== Demographics ==
Population Growth
Year	Pop.	±%
2001	1,513	—
2006	1,502	−0.7%
2011	1,669	+11.1%
2016	1,738	+4.1%
2021	1,818	+4.6%

In the 2021 Census of Population conducted by Statistics Canada, Carberry had a population of 1,818 living in 794 of its 847 total private dwellings, a change of 4.6% from its 2016 population of 1,738. With a land area of 4.8 km^{2} (1.9 sq mi), it had a population density of 378.8/km^{2} (981.0/sq mi) in 2021.

== Community ==
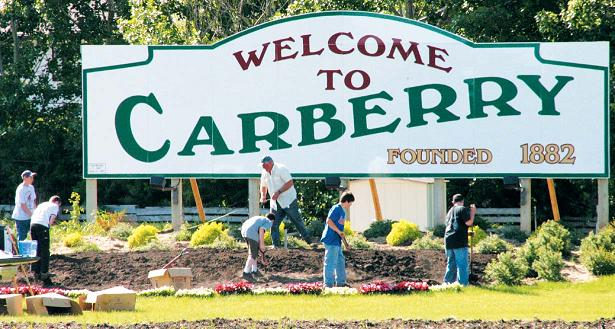
Carberry welcome sign on Highway 5

- Carberry & District Health Center
  - Carberry Hospital
  - Carberry Health Clinic
  - Dental Clinic
  - Laboratory and X-Ray
  - Personal Care Home
  - Home Care Services
  - Palliative Care Services
  - Public Health Services
- Carberry Plains Community Centre
  - Bowling
  - Hockey
  - Figure Skating
  - Curling
  - Public Skating
  - Tennis
  - Swimming
- Carberry Plains Museum
- Carberry Child Care Co-op
- R.J. Waugh Elementary School (K-4)
- Carberry Collegiate Institute (5–12)
- Royal Canadian Mounted Police Carberry Detachment
- Carberry/ North Cypress Fire Department
- Manitoba Conservation Carberry District Office
- Carberry/North Cypress Library
- Carberry Centennial Drop-In Centre/ Services for Seniors
- Carberry Recreation Baseball Park
- Royal Canadian Legion (branch 153)
- Sandhills Golf & Country Club

== Economy ==
Carberry and the surrounding rural area have been called "King Spud Country", a nickname based on the high quality potatoes grown in the area, with its ideal soil conditions for the crop. Many businesses in Carberry offer services and supplies to support the robust agriculture industry. Food processing makes use of locally produced crops and is a major employer in the community. A local factory owned by McCain Foods makes various potato products, and is a major supplier for McDonald's Restaurants in Canada and the United States as well as for other restaurants and grocery stores, including in other areas of the world. It is one of the most advanced potato-processing facilities in North America and normally operates 24 hours a day, 7 days a week.

The local agriculture industry is very diverse; besides potatoes there are other vegetables, grain, pulse, and industrial hemp crops as well as dairy, poultry, and livestock, among other mixed farming.

Carberry's population increased by 4.1% between 2011 and 2016, due in part to the community's strong, stable economy, along with other factors including its location near major transportation routes and the city of Brandon.

Carberry's proximity to Spruce Woods Provincial Park and the many unique recreational activities in the area make it a popular tourist destination. Many businesses and services cater to tourists both on a seasonal and year-round basis.

== Transportation ==
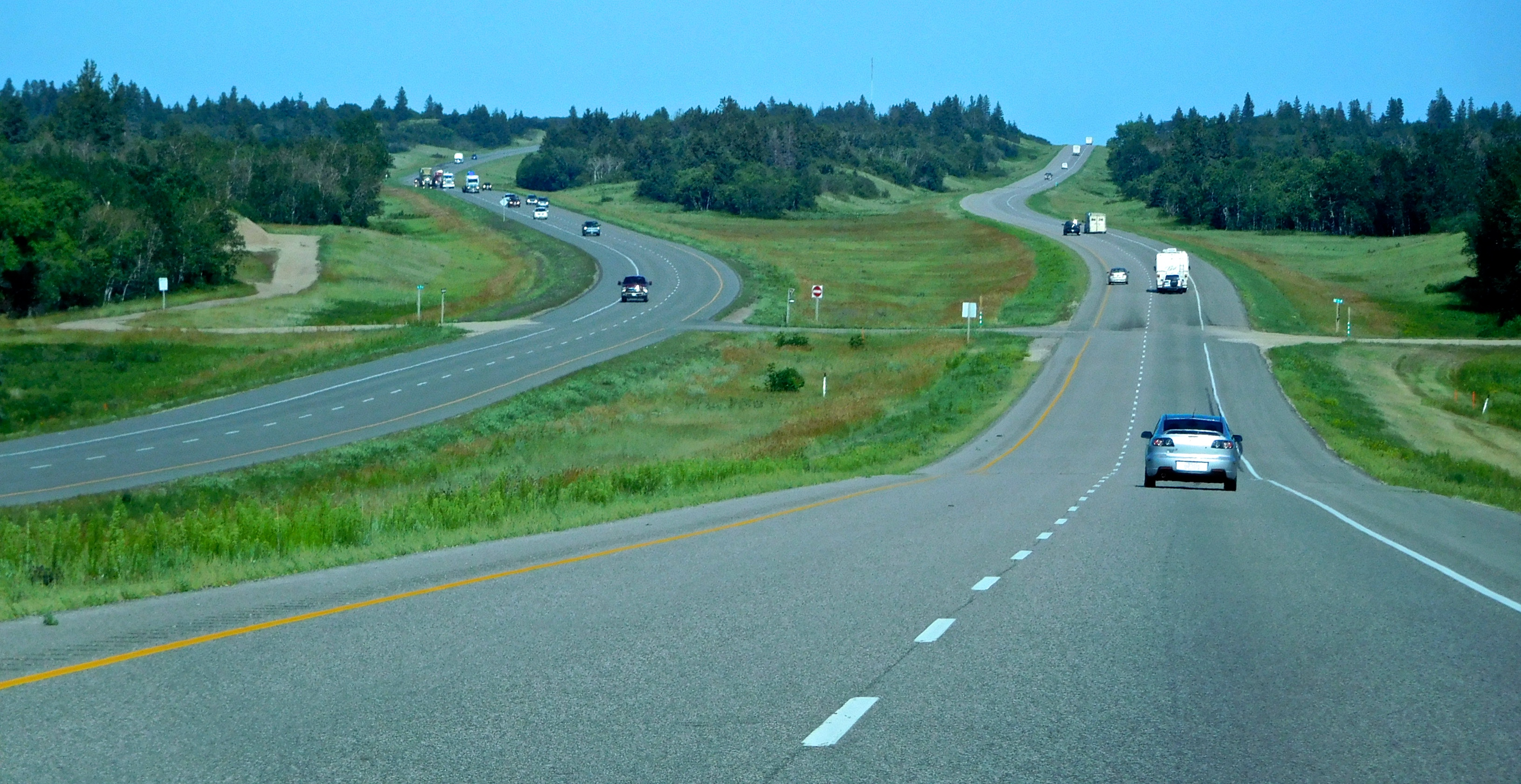
The Trans Canada Highway about 10 km (6.2 mi) east of Carberry

The Town of Carberry is located 3 kilometres (1.9 mi) south of the Trans Canada Highway on Highway 5, 50 kilometres (31 mi) east of Brandon, and 150 kilometres (93 mi) west of the provincial capital, Winnipeg. The nearest 24-hour Canada-U.S.A. land border crossing is located 120 kilometres (75 mi) southwest of Carberry at Boissevain on Highway 10.

The town is situated 20 kilometres (12 mi) north of Spruce Woods Provincial Park, which is also located on Highway 5, designated in Manitoba as the Parks Route.

The Brandon Municipal Airport is located 48 kilometres (30 mi) west of Carberry. The Brandon Air Shuttle provides passenger service on request between Carberry and the Winnipeg James Armstrong Richardson International Airport.

Both the Canadian Pacific Railway main line route and a Canadian National Railway branch line route run directly through Carberry. Via Rail passenger service is not offered in Carberry, however trains on the Toronto to Vancouver "The Canadian" Line can be accessed at the Rivers railway station located approximately 80 kilometres (50 mi) northwest of the community, while the Winnipeg – Churchill train as well as The Canadian can be accessed at the Portage la Prairie railway station located approximately 80 kilometres east of the community.

== Media ==
Carberry is home to the Carberry News-Express weekly newspaper and a local cable access television station, WCG Community Access Channel.

== Notable people ==
- Richard Burton (1925–1984), Welsh actor, was posted to Carberry as a Royal Air Force instructor during World War II.
- Mary Carter (née Munn) (1923–2010), one of the first female judges in Saskatchewan; part of childhood spent in Carberry.
- Mitchell Grobb, musician
- Bob Leslie, hockey coach and executive
- Wilfrid Reid "Wop" May (1896–1952), pilot, World War I hero
- Ernest Thompson Seton (1860–1946), author, artist, Woodcraft Indians founder, Boy Scouts of America founder
- Joan Thomas, author

== See also ==
- List of communities in Manitoba
