= Camp Hughes =

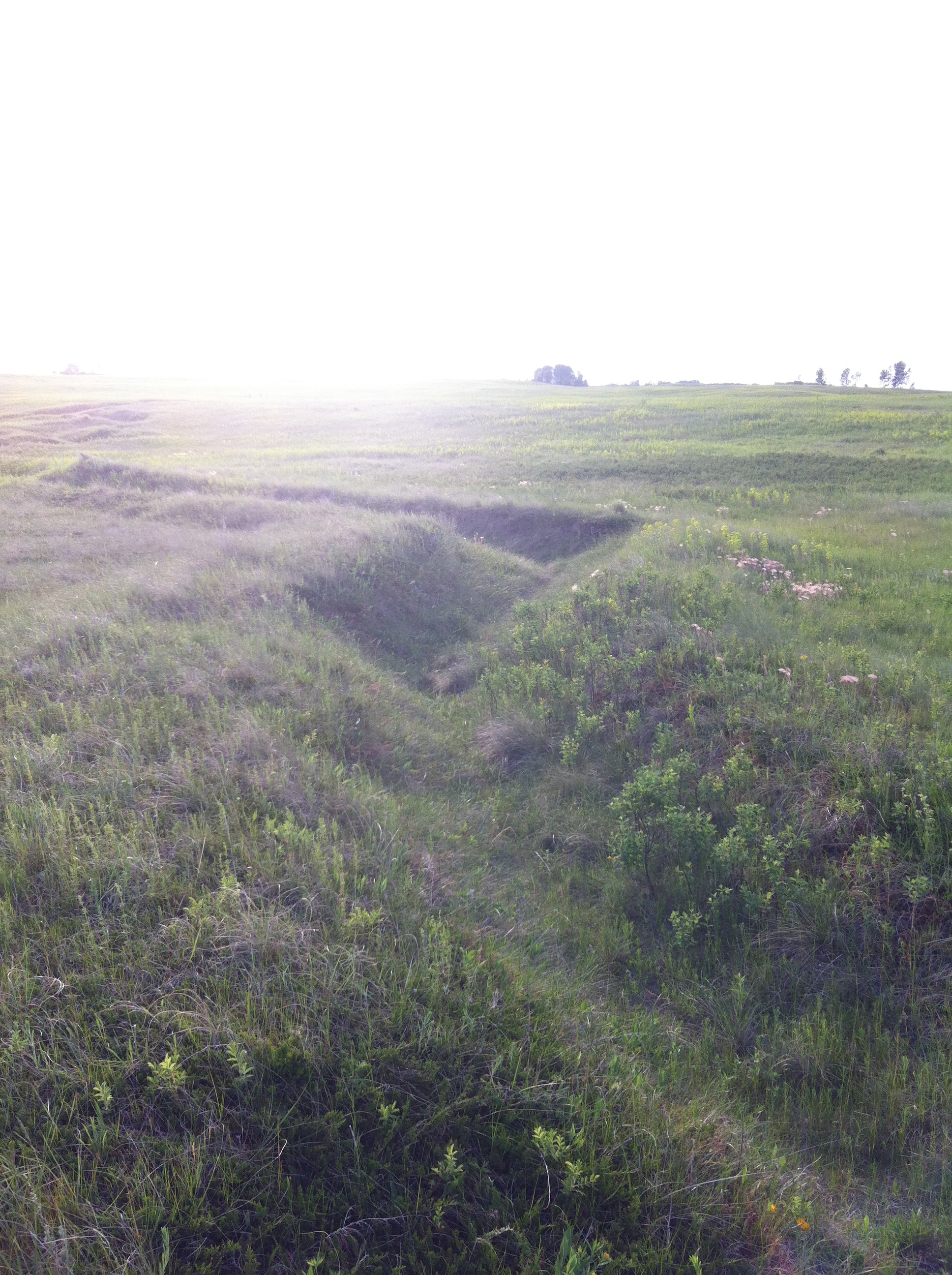
- Trenches at Camp Hughes built for training soldiers for battle in World War One
- Location: Manitoba, Canada
- Nearest city: North Cypress – Langford
- Coordinates: 49°53′1.47″N 099°33′4.82″W
- Established: 1909 (used until 1934)
- Founder: Government of Canada

National Historic Site of Canada
- Designated: 2011

Camp Hughes was a Canadian military training camp, located in the Municipality of North Cypress – Langford west of the town of Carberry in Manitoba, Canada. It was actively used for Army training from 1909 to 1934 and as a communications station from the early 1960s until 1991.

Camp Hughes was designated as a National Historic Site of Canada in 2011. It features an intact World War I battlefield terrain, which was created for training purposes by the Canadian Department of Militia between 1915 and 1916. It is now one of the only World War One era trench systems remaining in the world.

== History ==
In 1909, a Canadian military training camp named "Camp Sewell" was established 10 kilometers west of Carberry, south of the Canadian Pacific Railway line. It started out as a city of tents and covered a large area. The name of the camp was changed in 1915 to "Camp Hughes" in honour of Major-General Sir Sam Hughes, Canada's Minister of Militia and Defence at the time. Extensive trench systems, grenade and rifle ranges, and military structures were built at Camp Hughes between 1915 and 1916, and a variety of retail stores and entertainment complexes on a double-avenued area close to the main camp formed a lively commercial midway. During World War I, more than 38,000 troops of the Canadian Expeditionary Force trained at the camp, and by 1916 it had grown to such a large size that it had the largest population of any city in the province of Manitoba outside of the capital city, Winnipeg. Many of the soldiers who trained at Camp Hughes were later involved in the Battle of Vimy Ridge in France on April 9, 1917.

The soldiers and support staff stationed at Camp Hughes maintained very close social and economic ties with the town of Carberry, which is located a short distance away from the site.

The Canadian Army continued to train soldiers at the camp until 1934, when the camp closed and the troops were moved to nearby Camp Shilo, now CFB Shilo, and Kapyong Barracks, a now closed part of CFB Winnipeg, for financial and logistical reasons. The former camp saw some use during World War II.

By the early 1960s, the site re-opened as a Cold War remote transmitter station for Camp Shilo. A one-level bunker was built on the property. The bunker was closed in 1992 and has since been demolished.

== Today ==
Although very eroded after over 85 years, the original trench system at Camp Hughes is still intact and is the only World War One era trench system remaining in North America.

The Camp Hughes Cemetery, which is located on what is known as Cemetery Hill, also remains at Camp Hughes.

The Camp Hughes National Historic Site is no longer used for active military use, therefore the area is completely open to the public and access is unrestricted. It does however continue to be monitored by the Canadian Department of National Defense, as the Camp Hughes site is located less than 1 km away from a restricted area of CFB Shilo.

== Official recognition ==
In 1994, Camp Hughes was designated by the Government of Manitoba as a Provincial Heritage Site. In 2011, the site was designated a National Historic Site of Canada.

There is a roadside park named "Camp Hughes Wayside Park" located 10 kilometers west of Carberry on the Trans Canada Highway at the west intersection with PTH 351, a short distance north of the actual Camp Hughes site, named in honour of the military camp.

== Photo gallery ==
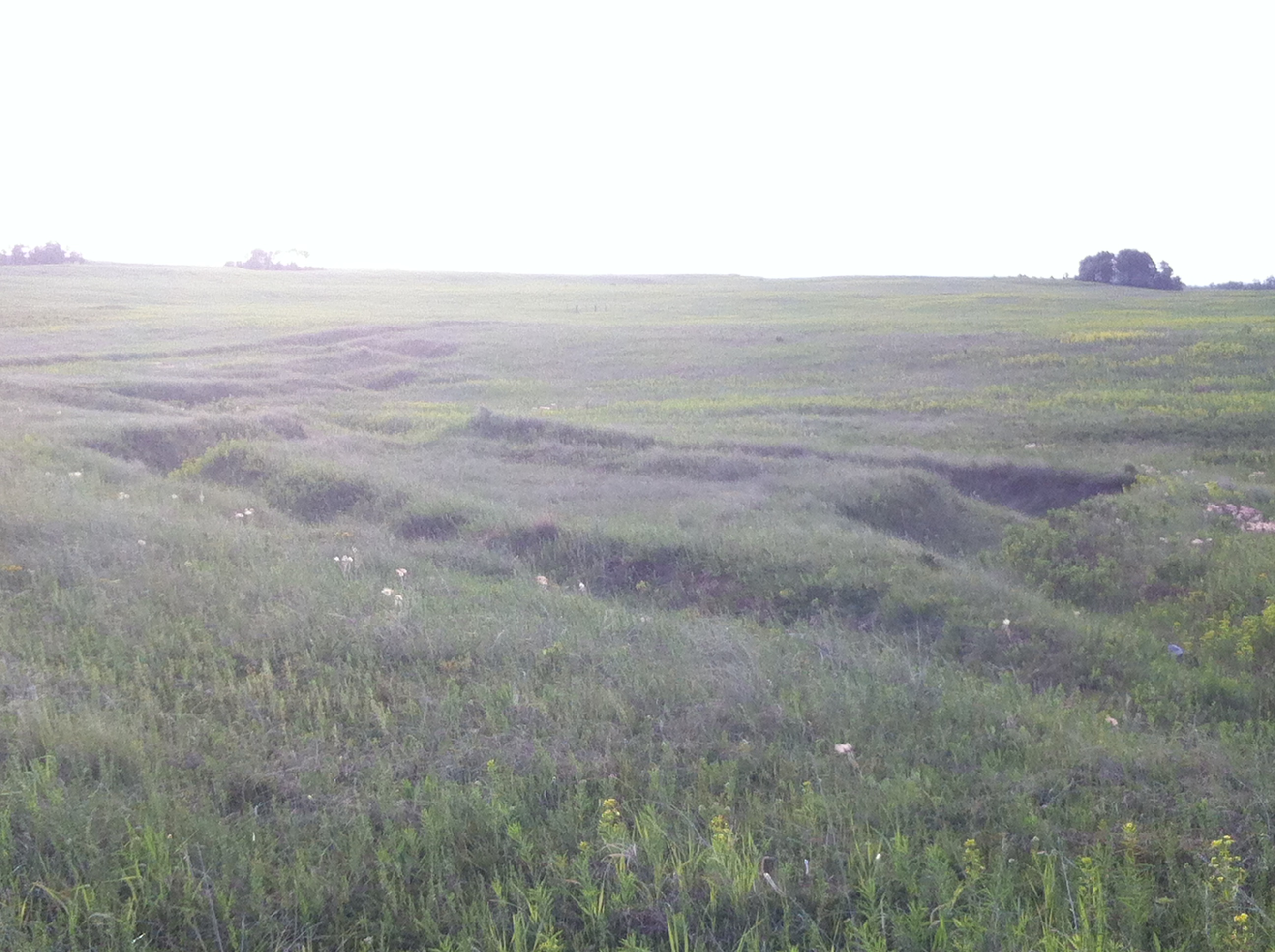
Trenches at Camp Hughes

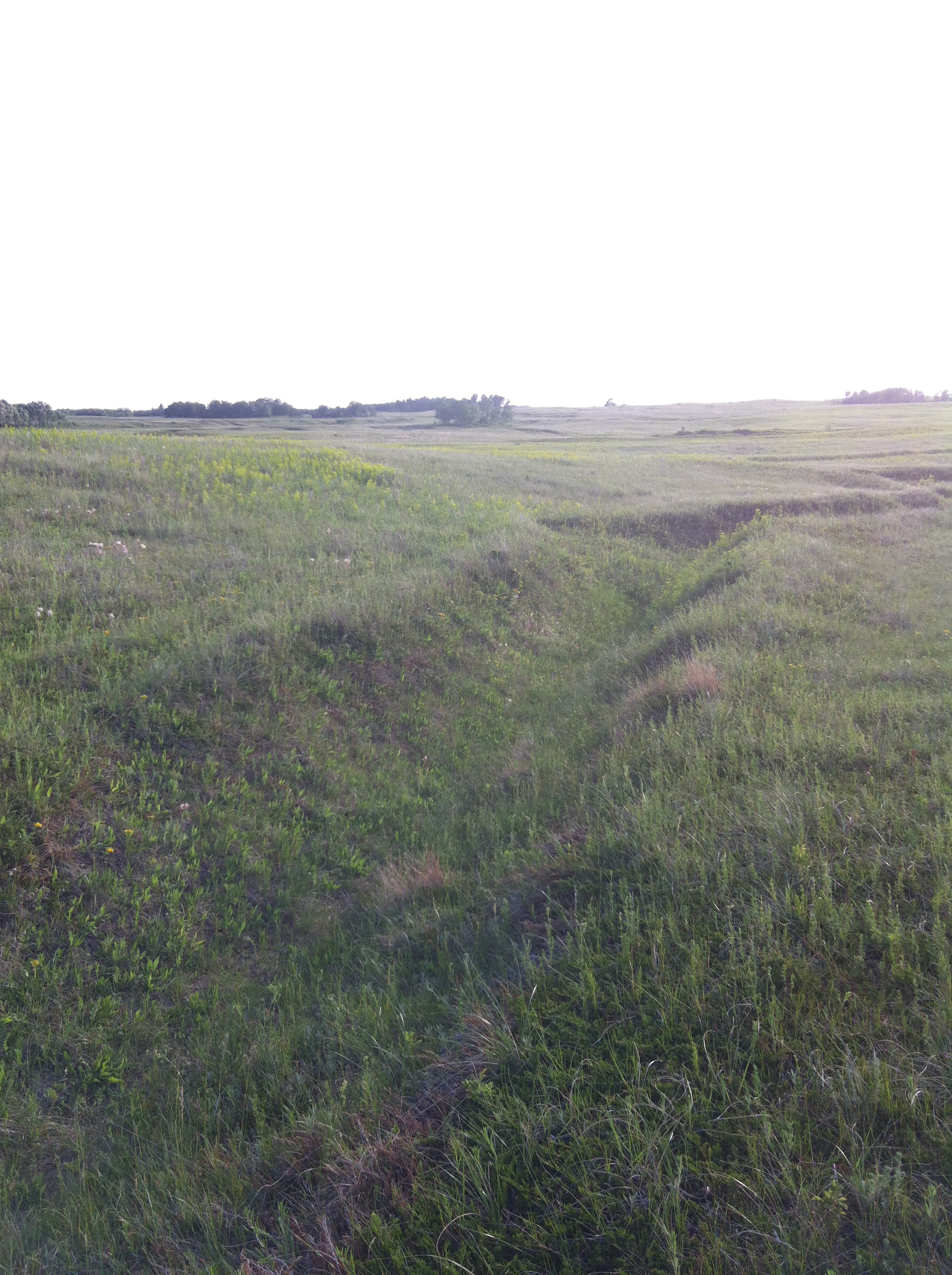
Trenches at Camp Hughes

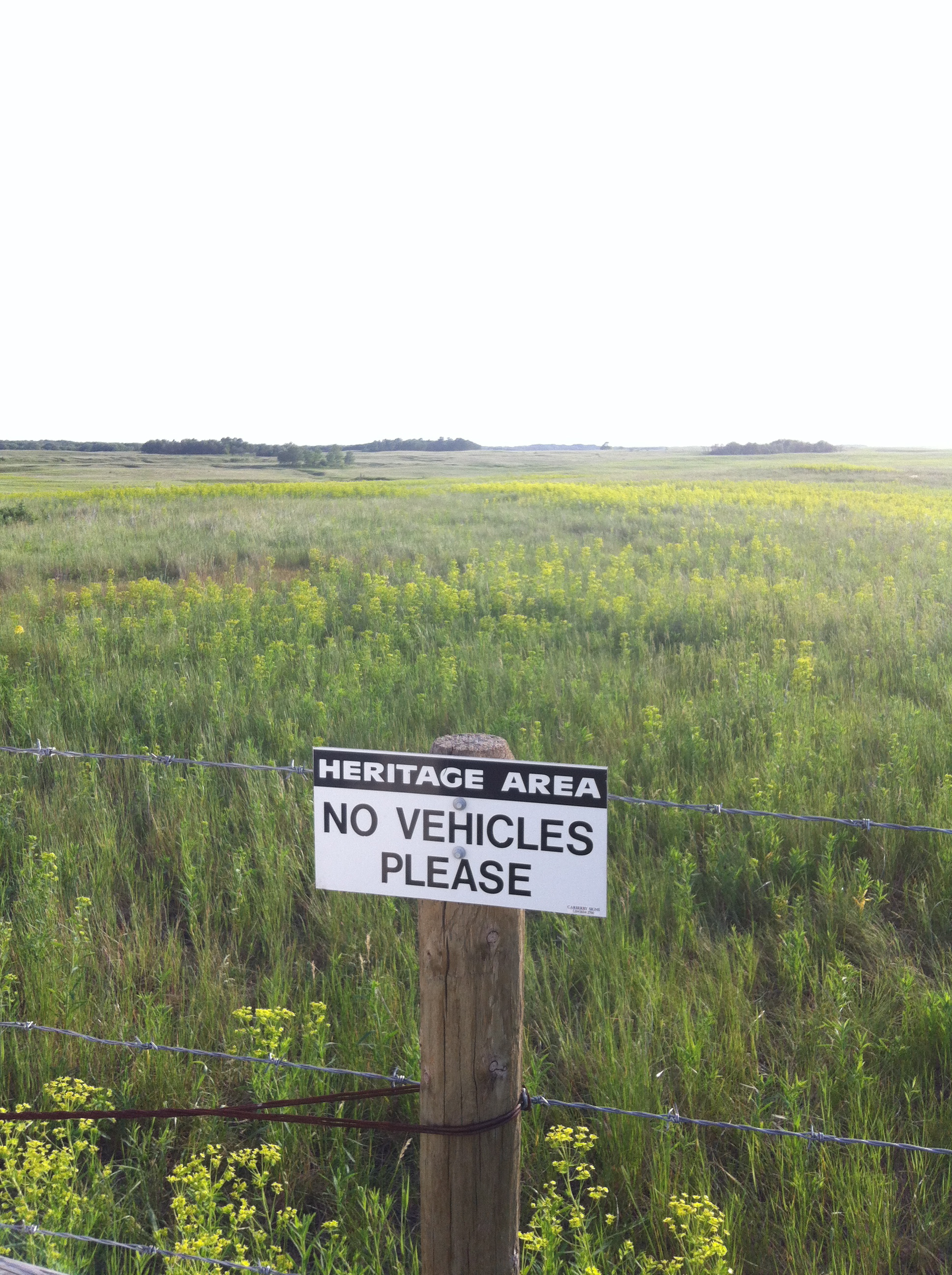
A sign marking the boundary of the historical area

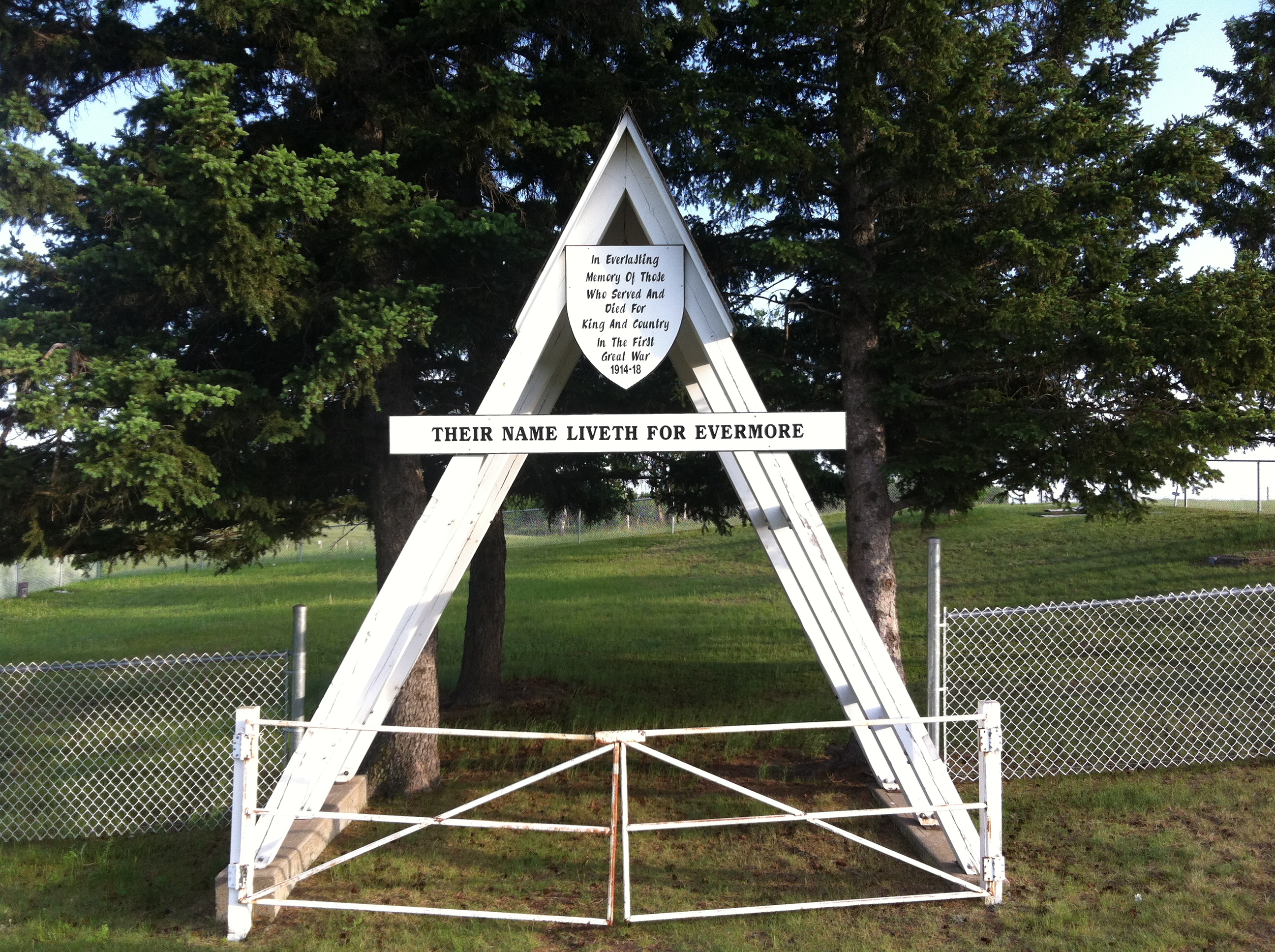
Entrance to the Camp Hughes Cemetery

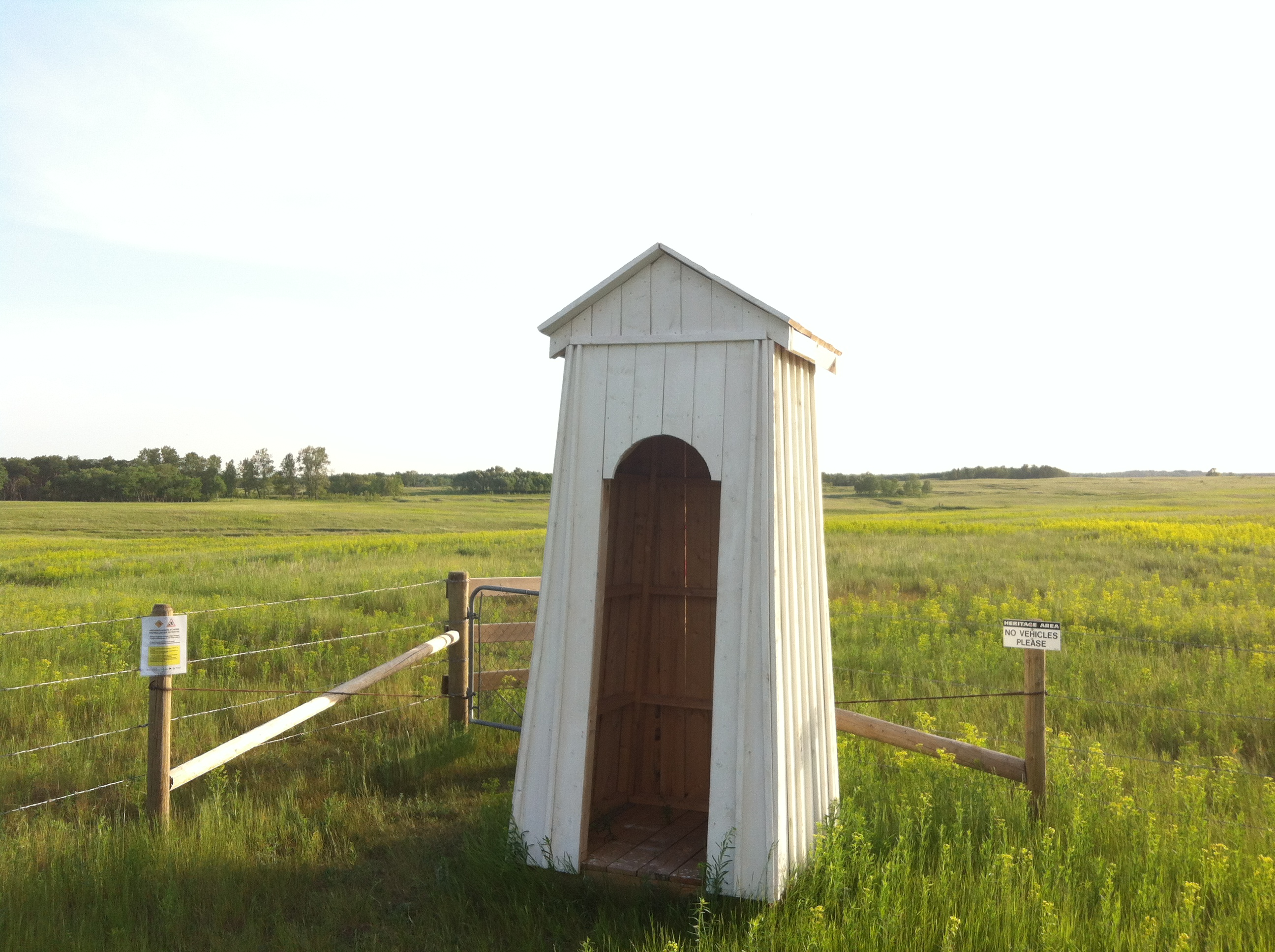
Entrance gate to the area where the trench systems are located. Maps and other information are located here.

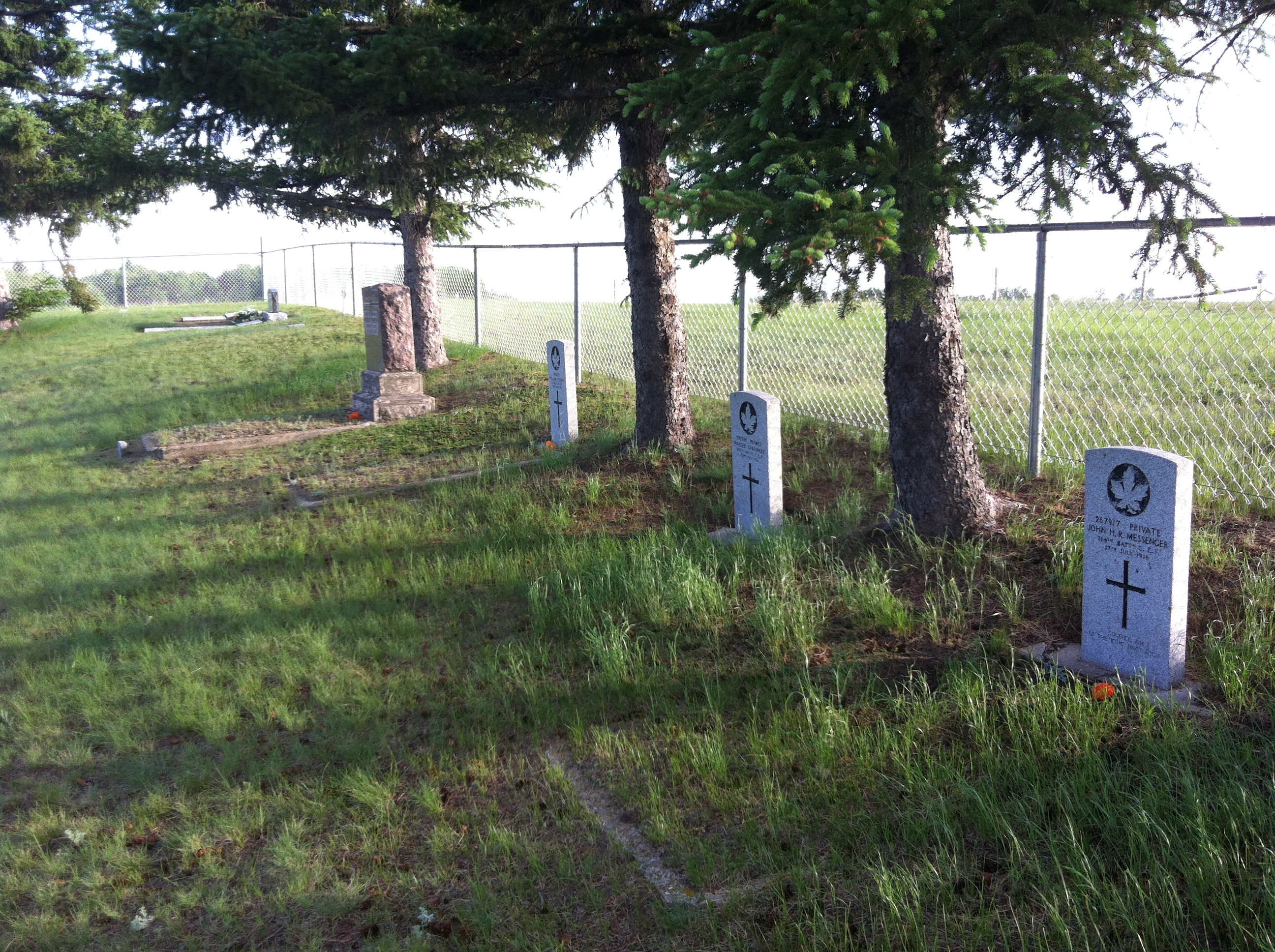
Headstones in the Camp Hughes Cemetery

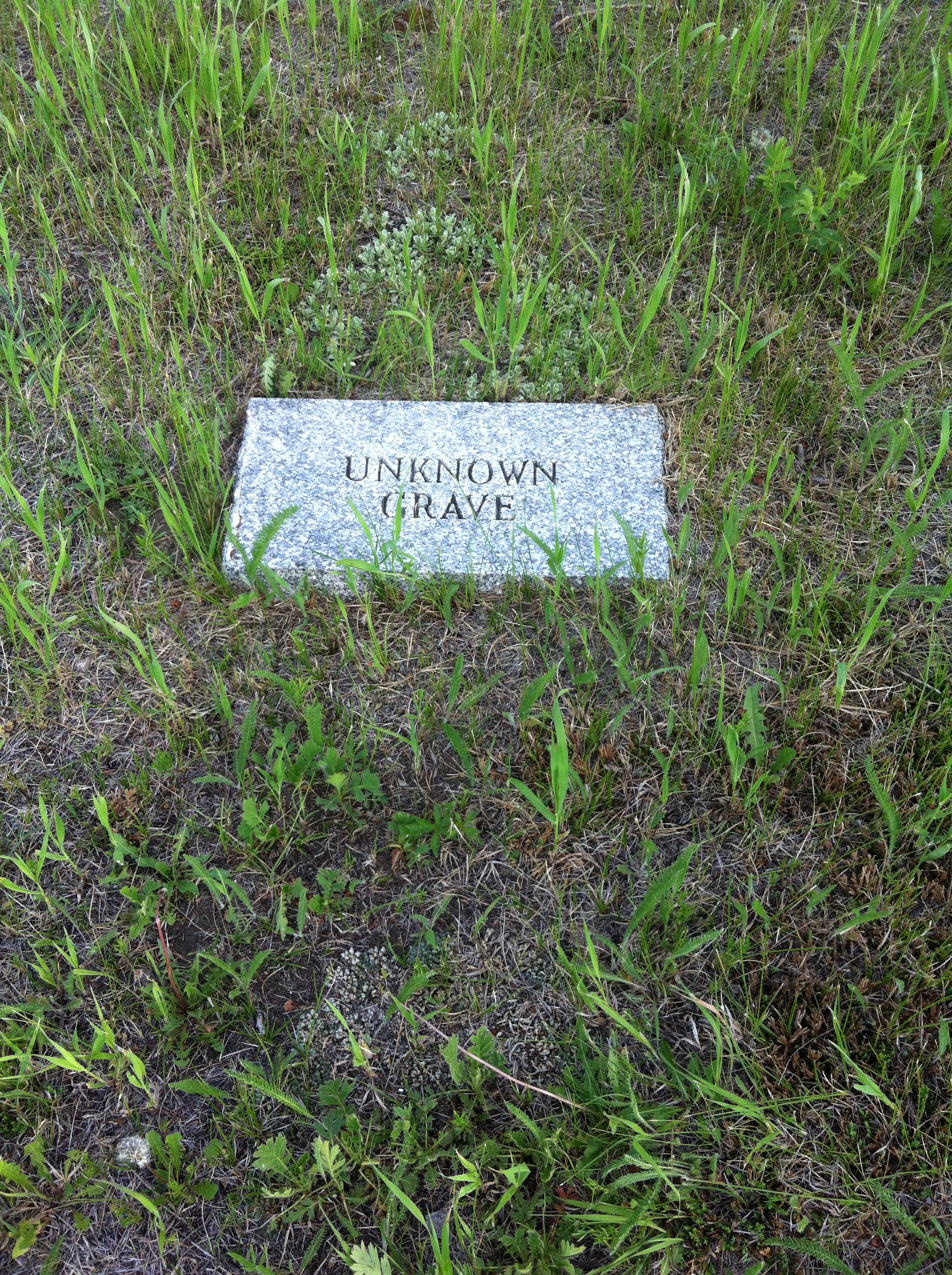
Unknown grave at Camp Hughes

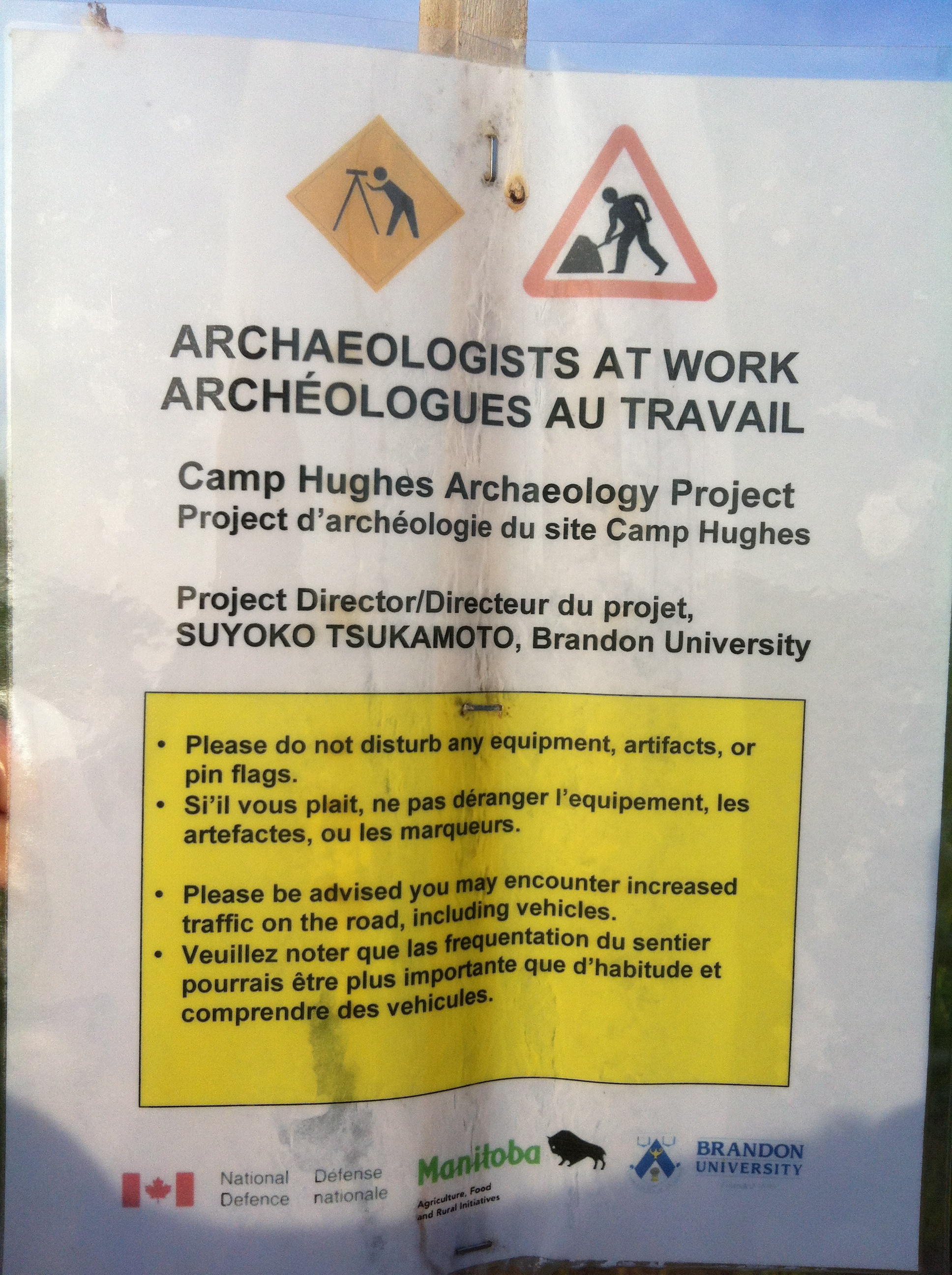
Sign notifying visitors of archeological research activity at Camp Hughes (taken in 2013)

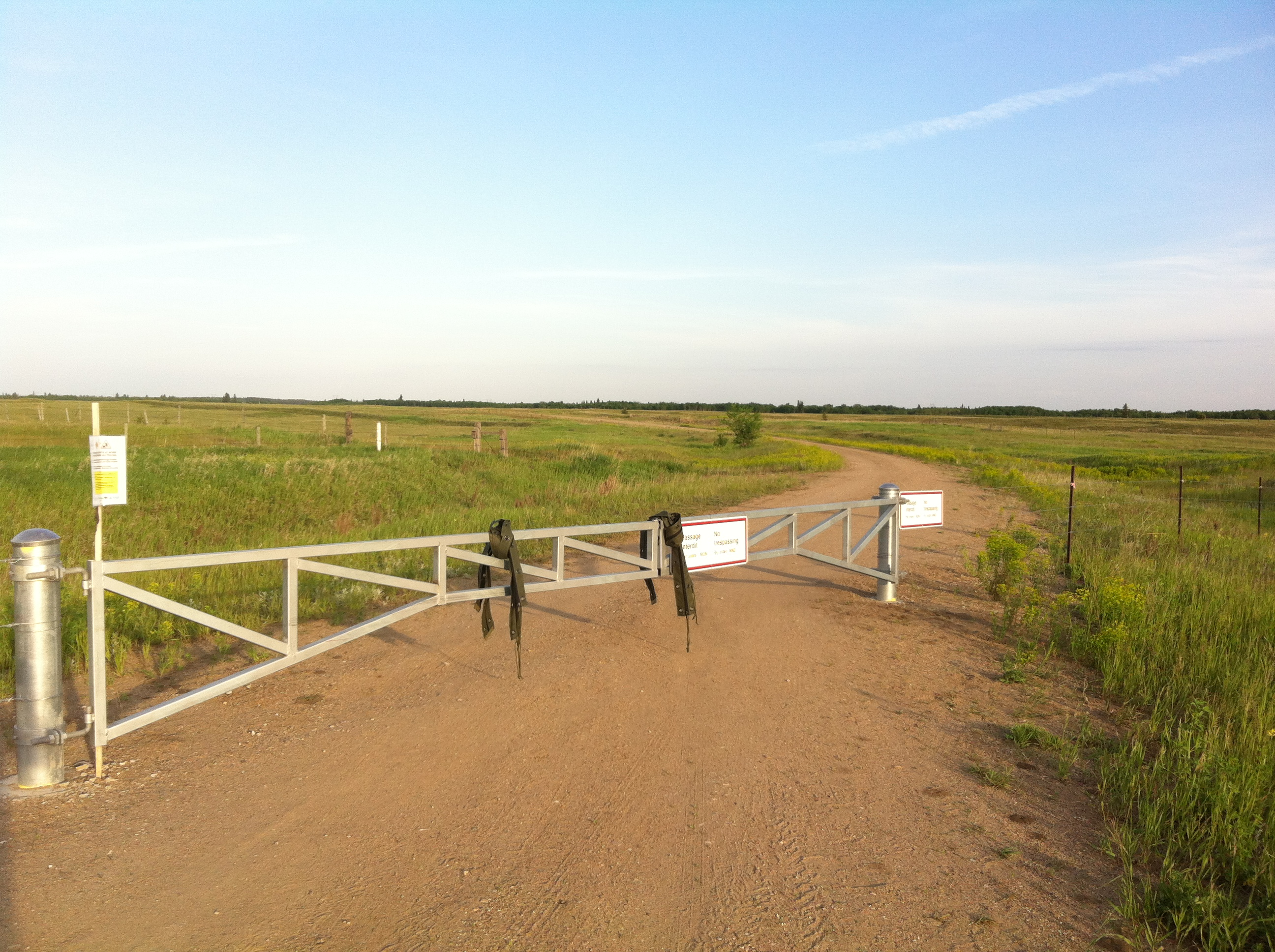
A gate near Camp Hughes on the boundary of the restricted DND area connected to CFB Shilo

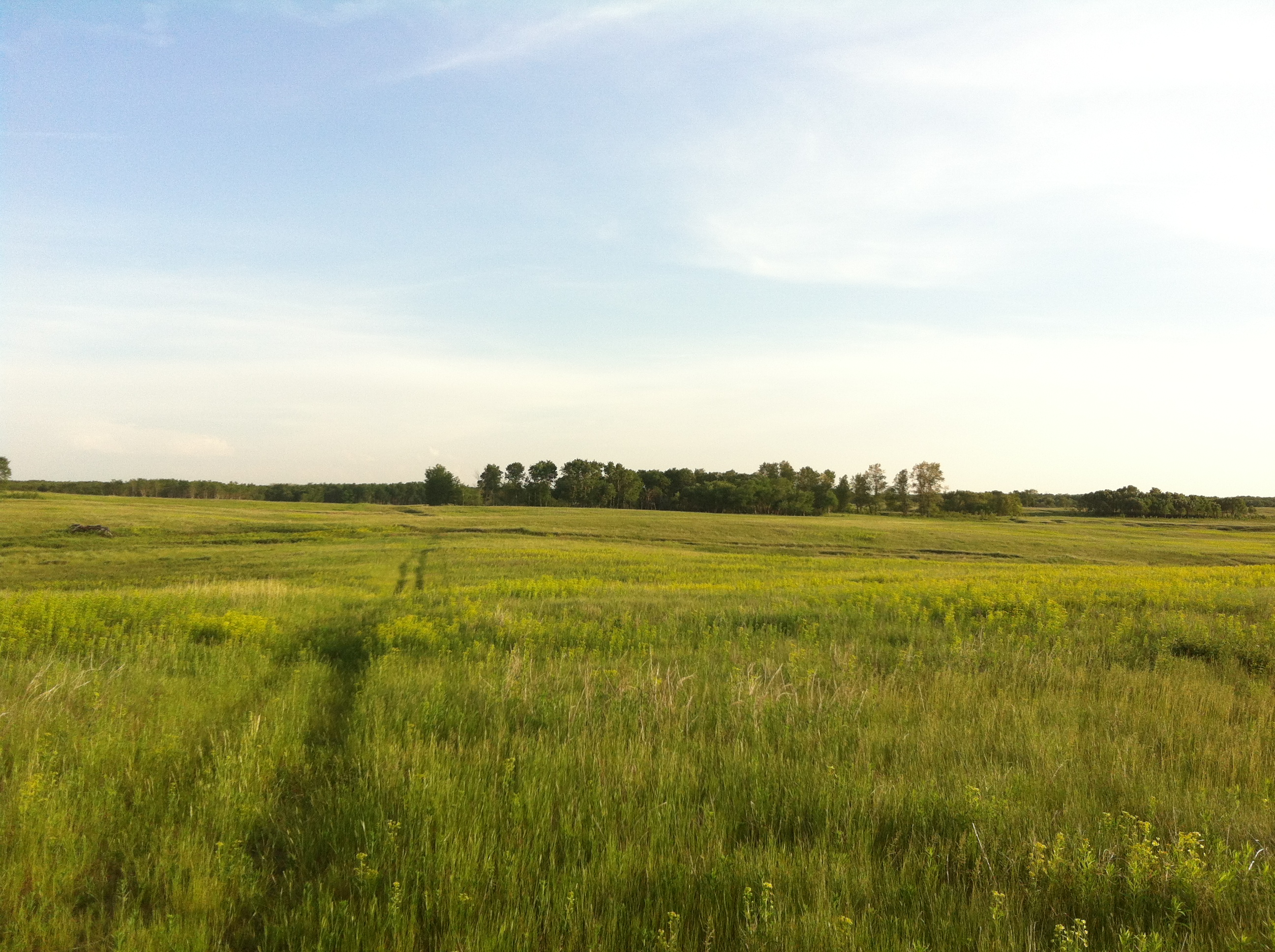
The main walking trail leading to trenches in the historical area

== See also ==
- RCAF Station Carberry
- History of the Canadian Army
