= Michael Carberry (rugby league) =

Australian rugby league footballer

Personal information
- Full name: Michael Carberry
- Born: 13 May 1961 (age 63)

Playing information
- Position: Lock, Second-row
Club
Years	Team	Pld	T	G	FG	P
1980–84	South Sydney	68	7	0	1	27
1985–90	Illawarra Steelers	89	5	0	0	20
	Total	157	12	0	1	47
- Source: As of 27 February 2019

Michael Carberry is an Australian former professional rugby league footballer who played in the 1980s and 1990s. Carberry played for Illawarra and South Sydney in the NSWRL competition.

== Playing career ==
Carberry made his first grade debut for South Sydney against St George in Round 1 1980 at Kogarah Oval. Carberry played with Souths for 5 seasons before departing the club at the end of 1984.

In 1985, Carberry signed with Illawarra and played with the club for a total of 6 seasons, 3 of which ended with the club finishing last and claiming the wooden spoon in 1985, 1986 and 1989.

Carberry retired at the end of the 1990 season.

== Post playing ==
In 2006, Carberry was named in Illawarra's "Team of Steel" celebrating 25 years since the team's creation and featuring the best players to have played for the club.
