= Battle of Carberry Hill =

1567 battle in Scotland

- Part of the Marian civil war
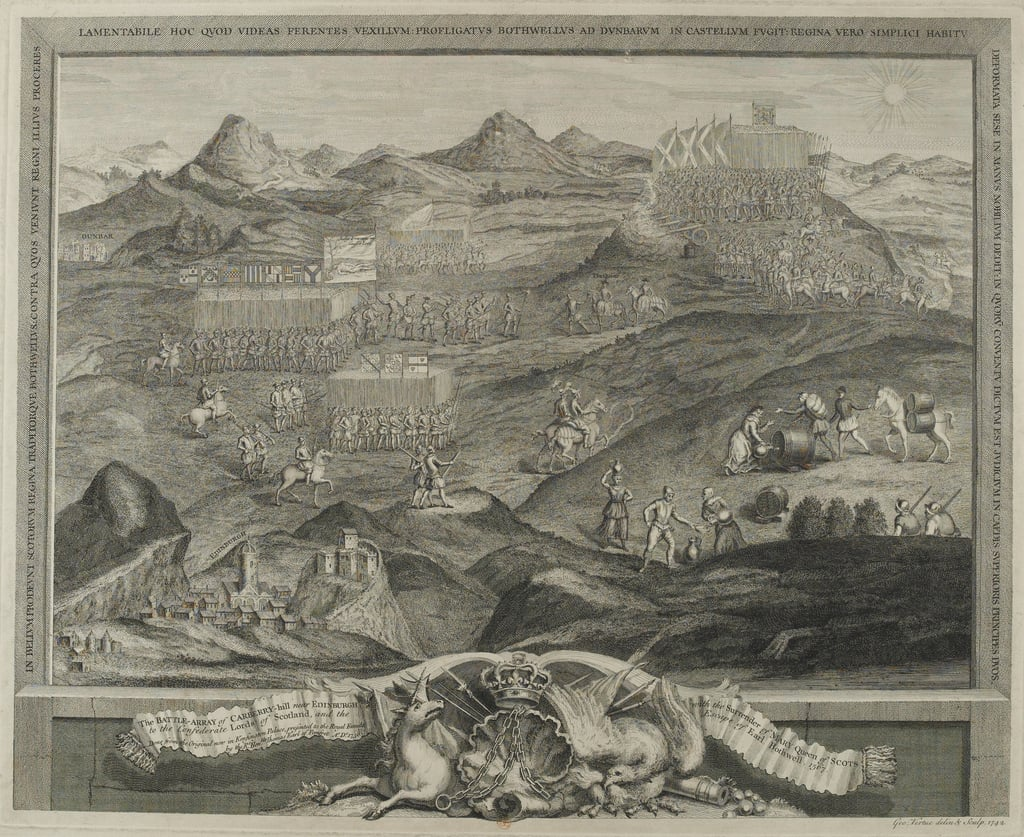
- George Vertueː The Battle Array of Carberry Hill near Edinburgh in 1567 (1742)
Date	15 June 1567
Location	Carberry Hill, near Musselburgh, East Lothian, Scotland
Result	Victory for opponents of Mary, Queen of Scots

Belligerents
Forces loyal to Mary, Queen of Scots	Forces opposed to Mary, Queen of Scots

Commanders and leaders
Earl of Bothwell	Kirkcaldy of Grange

Strength
2,000, including 200 musketeers 300 pikemen	2,000

Casualties and losses
Unknown	Unknown

The Battle of Carberry Hill took place on 15 June 1567, near Carberry Tower in East Lothian, a few miles east of Edinburgh, Scotland.

A number of Scottish lords objected to the rule of Mary, Queen of Scots, after she married Earl of Bothwell, who was widely believed to have murdered her previous husband Lord Darnley. The Lords were intent to avenge Darnley's death. However, Bothwell escaped from the stand-off at Carberry while Queen Mary surrendered. Mary abdicated, escaped from prison, and was defeated at the battle of Langside. She went to exile in England while her supporters continued a civil war in Scotland.

== Contested marriage ==
On 15 May 1567, Queen Mary married James Hepburn, 4th Earl of Bothwell. Many of the Queen's allies who previously supported her, including Maitland, Morton, Balfour, and Murray of Tullibardine, disapproved of this and chose to oppose her. Many of the same Lords who claimed disapproval in June had signed the Ainslie Tavern Bond only two months earlier in April, pledging support for the marriage.

In April, Bothwell, along with several others, had been accused of Lord Darnley's murder. Bothwell was acquitted of the charge. His chief prosecutor, Darnley's father, the Earl of Lennox, failed to appear at the trial despite multiple summons. His 3,000 armed retainers were turned back when confronted by Bothwell's 4,000, and then Lennox chose not to appear. Scottish law of the time prohibited an accuser from bringing armed troops to a trial. Many Scottish nobles disputed the trial verdict, and James Murray, brother of the laird of Tullibardine, offered to duel with Bothwell or prove the guilt of Darnley's murder on Bothwell's henchmen. Despite this very public dissent, Mary made Bothwell the Duke of Orkney and Marquis of Fife on 12 May 1567, then married him three days later.

== Movements before battle ==
On 11 June 1567 Bothwell's enemies, the Confederate Lords, assembled in armour in Edinburgh, with a printed proclamation of their intention to deliver the Queen, revenge Darnley's murder, and preserve the Prince. Mary was at Borthwick Castle with Bothwell. The Confederate Lords began to besiege them but Bothwell escaped. Mary disguised herself as a pageboy to ride to Dunbar and meet Bothwell.

The French ambassador Philibert du Croc described Bothwell and Mary's force marching from Dunbar, with supporters joining at Haddington. Mary made a proclamation at Gladsmuir. They stayed at Seton Palace and the next day came to Prestonpans. Du Croc heard the army of the Confederate Lords were at the "port" or "pont de la Madelaine" west of Fisherrow before crossing the River Esk and marching in the valley towards Dalkeith. Both armies intended to gain the tactical advantage of siting themselves on a hill. According to Du Croc, their positions were two or three crossbow shots from each other.

== Stand-off at Carberry Hill ==
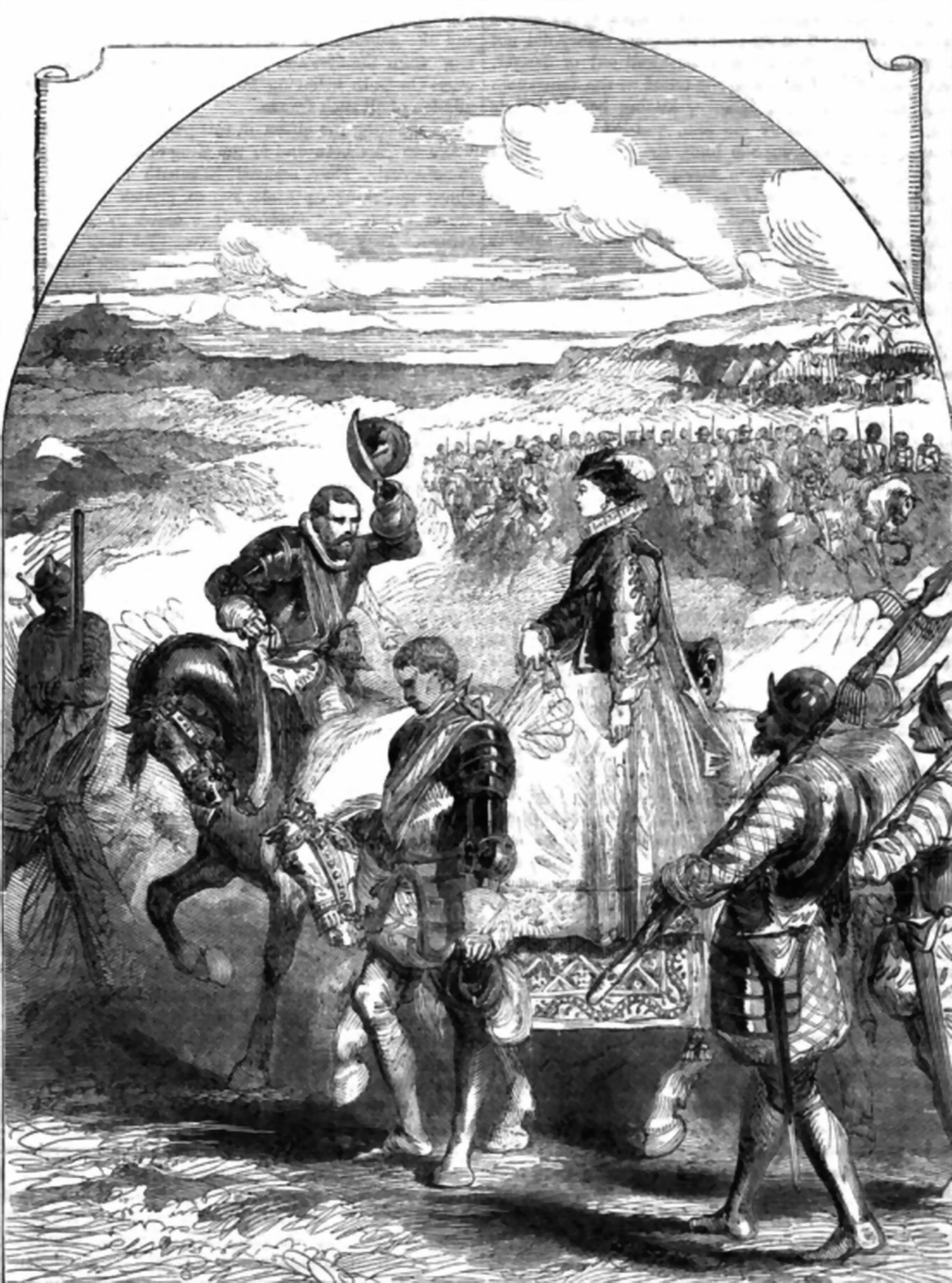
Surrender of Mary, Queen of Scots, at Carberry Hill (Cassell's Illustrated History of England, Vol. 2)

With only the support of the Hamiltons, Queen Mary and Bothwell left Fa'side Castle on the morning of 15 June 1567 and took position on the nearby field of battle at Carberry Hill against her enemies, the rebel Confederate Lords. Mary's army, according to John Knox, took their position at Carberry Hill in an entrenchment made by the English for the Battle of Pinkie twenty years before. They were armed with cannon and pole-arms brought from Dunbar Castle. According to a letter sent to the Archbishop of Glasgow, the Queen had 200 "hagbutters" commanded by Captains Alexander Stewart and Hew Lauder of her royal guard. Seven or eight cannon were brought from Dunbar Castle to defend the Queen's position at the "auld fort" by Fawside Castle. Bothwell's men had also brought 300 pikes from the armoury at Dunbar. After the surrender these weapons were captured and dispersed, and in September 1567 the Scottish Privy Council wrote to the villages around Carberry asking for their return.

The Confederate Lords approached from Musselburgh with an army of equal force, to the "north side of Cousland". David Calderwood wrote they were 2,000 but with only a few "harquebusiers" who were volunteers from Edinburgh. Knox, with local knowledge, wrote that they rounded the hill to get an easier ascent and make an approach from Carberry village without the sun in their eyes. At first during this manoeuvre Mary's army thought the Confederate Lords were bypassing them and fleeing to Dalkeith. The stand-off lasted from 11 o'clock in the morning till 5 o'clock in the afternoon. With the armies marshalled against each other, the French ambassador Philibert du Croc tried to negotiate, and received from the Earl of Morton his firm resolution to fight against the murderer of Lord Darnley. Bothwell's first action was to fire his cannon at cavalry 'prickers' who tried to draw the Queen's party out to fight.

Queen Mary's supporters carried the banner of the Lion of Scotland; the rebel Lords' banner depicted the murder scene showing Darnley dead under a tree with the infant James VI, with the motto, "Judge and Revenge my cause, O Lord". This banner had been flown as a flag at Edinburgh castle.

Bothwell offered single combat to any of the Confederate Lords. William Kirkcaldy accepted the challenge, but Bothwell would not fight him as he was merely a baron. He also refused James Murray, the brother of William Murray of Tullibardine, and was reluctant to fight Lord Lindsay. Mary announced there would be no single combat.

It was hot and Queen Mary's supporters had nothing to drink. The day dragged on. Two of Bothwell's supporters, Edmund Blackadder and the laird of Wedderburn, understanding that Bothwell was intending to leave, made their apologies to the Queen and rode away. In response to an oath made by the rebel Lords, Queen Mary agreed to surrender to Kirkcaldy. He led her horse by the bridle down from the hill, to Morton's camp, and is said to have made her formal surrender to Confederate Lords at Cousland Castle. Bothwell rode off to Dunbar Castle with 25 horsemen. A drawing of the battlefield sent to London with a newsletter survives and gives a schematic idea of the events.

When William Drury, Marshall of Berwick sent a drawing of the Confederate Lords' banner and the plan to London, he added this postscript:

"The Queen's apparel in the field was after the fashion of the women of Edinburgh, in a red petticoat, sleeves tied with points, a "partlyte," a velvet hat and muffler. She used great persuasions and encouragements to her people to have tried it by battle. For welcome the Lords showed her the banner with the dead body, which seeing they say that she wished she had never seen him. The banner was hanged out before her window at the Provost's house (in Edinburgh), wherewith she seemed much offended.

George Buchanan wrote that Mary surrendered "dressed only in a short shabby robe, that scarcely reached below her knee." A French account written by the Captain of Inchkeith mentions her garment left her legs half covered. Mary had left her more elaborate outfit in a chest at Fawside Castle: a black dress sewn with grains of jet, a crimson coat and cloak, and her gold and silver embroidered hat.

== Queen and King's men ==
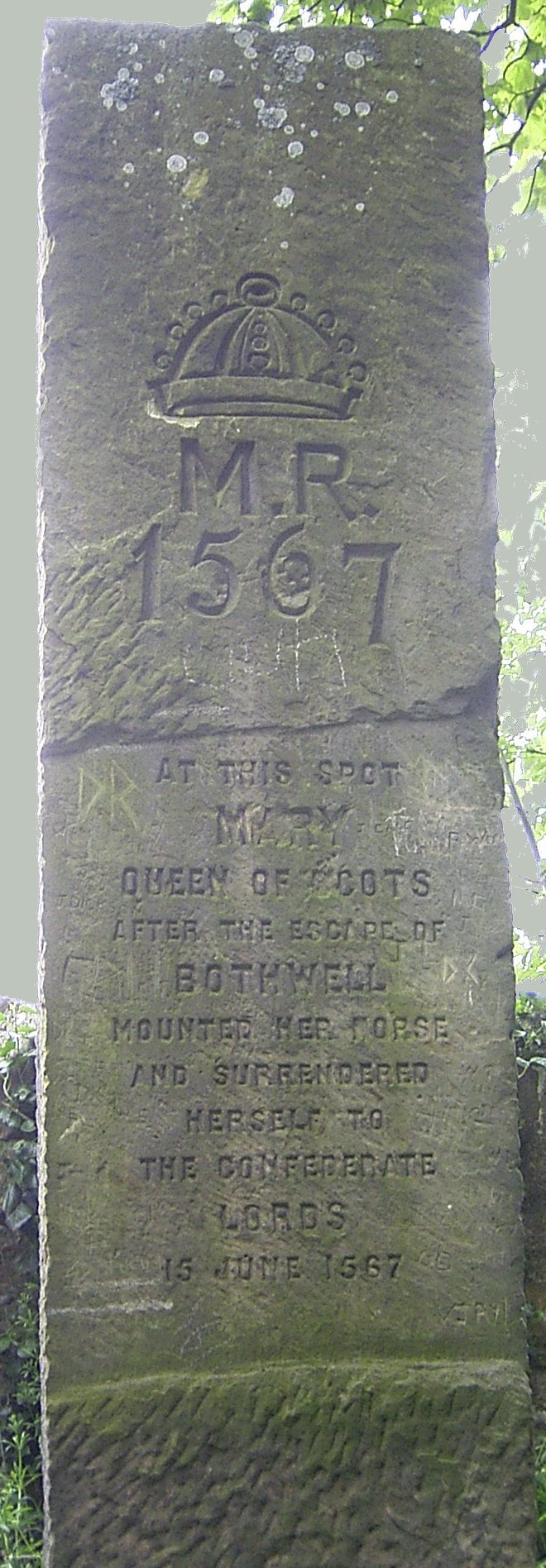
Commemorative Stane at Carberry marking the site of the conflict

According to the later chronicle called The Historie of James the Sext, Queen Mary's supporters at Carberry were George Seton, 7th Lord Seton, Lord Hay of Yester, Lord Borthwick, John Cockburn of Ormiston, Home of Wedderburn, Blackadder of Tulliallan, and Cockburn of Langtoun.

The Confederate Lords included the Regent Morton, John Erskine, Earl of Mar, Alexander Cunningham, 5th Earl of Glencairn, the Lords Lindsay, William Ruthven, 1st Earl of Gowrie, Alexander Home, 5th Lord Home, Lord Sempill, Lord Sanquhar, and the lairds William Murray of Tullibardine, Douglas of Drumlanrig, Kirkcaldy of Grange and all their horsemen and foot soldiers.

== Aftermath ==
The rebel Lords took Queen Mary to Edinburgh. Some chronicles say she was first held in the lodging of Simon Preston of Craigmillar. Betraying their oath at Carberry Hill, the Lords imprisoned her in Lochleven Castle, near Kinross, where her keeper was Sir William Douglas, half brother to James Stewart, 1st Earl of Moray. William Kirkcaldy was infuriated at the rebel Lords' betrayal of the oath, which he had represented to her in good faith. According to George Buchanan the spy Ninian Cockburn raced to the French court with news of Mary's capture. On the way he overtook her ambassador, William Chisholm, Bishop of Dunblane, who was ignorant of Mary's defeat, and upstaged him in front of Charles IX of France and Catherine de Medici.

Queen Mary remained in prison for eleven months while accusations continued by the Lords who deposed her at Carberry Hill. Bothwell obtained a ship and first went to Shetland, where he was helped by Olave Sinclair. He evaded Murray of Tullibardine and William Kirkcaldy whose ship the Lion ran aground. Then he crossed the sea to Norway, captivity, and madness.

Mary escaped from Lochleven and made for Dumbarton Castle in the west of Scotland. She was drawn into battle at Langside and defeated. Mary sought safety in England, became a closely watched captive, and was executed in 1587. In Scotland, her supporters continued a civil war for the next five years.
