= RCAF Station Carberry =

World War II air training station in Manitoba, Canada

- Carberry, Manitoba; Near Carberry, Manitoba in Canada

Site information
- Operator: Formerly Royal Canadian Air Force

Location
- Coordinates: 49°51′4.27″N 99°20′13.16″W

Site history
- Built: 1940

Airfield information
- Identifiers: IATA: none, ICAO: none
Runways
Direction	Length and surface
03R/33L	3,000 feet (914 m) rolled gravel
03L/33R	2,600 feet (792 m) rolled gravel
13R/23L	2,600 feet (792 m) rolled gravel
13L/23R	2,600 feet (792 m) rolled gravel
09L/27R	3,000 feet (914 m) rolled gravel
09R/27L	3,000 feet (914 m) rolled gravel

RCAF Station Carberry was a Second World War air training station located near Carberry, Manitoba, Canada.

== History ==
=== World War II ===
The Royal Air Force (RAF), opened No. 33 Service Flying Training School (SFTS) here in December 1940. As with all RAF training facilities in Canada, the station was subject to Royal Canadian Air Force (RCAF) administrative and operational control and formally became part of the British Commonwealth Air Training Plan in 1942. The school closed in November 1944.

=== Aerodrome information ===
The airfield was one of the few double-sided aerodromes built for wartime training with six parallel runways formed in a triangle rather than the typical three runways formed in a triangle. In approximately 1942 the aerodrome was listed at 49°51′N 99°20′W with a Var. 12 degrees E and elevation of 1250'. Six runways were listed as follows:

Runway Name	Length	Width	Surface
8/26	2,850 feet (869 m)	100 feet (30 m)	Hard surfaced
8/26	2,850 feet (869 m)	100 feet (30 m)	Hard surfaced
2/20	2,765 feet (843 m)	100 feet (30 m)	Hard surfaced
2/20	2,765 feet (843 m)	100 feet (30 m)	Hard surfaced
12/30	2,710 feet (826 m)	100 feet (30 m)	Hard surfaced
12/30	2,710 feet (826 m)	100 feet (30 m)	Hard surfaced

=== Relief landing field – Petrel ===
A relief landing field for RCAF Station Carberry was located approximately 8 Miles north. The relief field was constructed in the typical triangular pattern. In approximately 1942 the aerodrome was listed at 49°58′N 99°21′W with a Var. 12 degrees E and elevation of 1,280 feet (390 m). Three runways were listed as follows:

Runway Name	Length	Width	Surface
14/32	2,700 feet (823 m)	100 feet (30 m)	Hard surfaced
2/20	2,720 feet (829 m)	100 feet (30 m)	Hard surfaced
8/26	2,680 feet (817 m)	100 feet (30 m)	Hard surfaced

A review of Google Maps on 8 June 2018 shows no visibility of the airfield.

=== Relief landing field – Oberon ===
The probable second relief landing field for RCAF Station Carberry was located approximately 15 miles north. The relief field was listed as turf with a triangular runway layout. In approximately 1942 the aerodrome was listed at 50°03′N 99°28′W with a Var. 12 degrees E and elevation of 1,274 feet (388 m). The aerodrome was listed as an All way field with three runways, they were listed as follows:

Runway Name	Length	Width	Surface
13/31	3,200 feet (975 m)	1,000 feet (305 m)	Turf
8/26	3,300 feet (1,006 m)	1,000 feet (305 m)	Turf
3/21	2,920 feet (890 m)	1,000 feet (305 m)	Turf

A review of Google Maps on 8 June 2018 shows no visibility of an airfield near the posted coordinates.

=== Postwar ===
After the war the station was used as a storage depot until the RCAF moved out.

== Current use ==
The site is now the location of a McCain Foods potato processing facility.

== See also ==
- Carberry, Manitoba
- Rural Municipality of North Cypress
- Camp Hughes
