= Carbery =

Carbery or Carbury may refer to:

People

- Brian Carbury (1918–1961), New Zealand fighter ace
- Douglas Carbery (1894–1959), British soldier and airman
- Ethna Carbery (1864–1902), Irish writer
- James Joseph Carbery (1823–1887), Irish Dominican, Bishop of Hamilton, Canada
- Joe Carbury (1926–2017) Canadian rodeo announcer
- Joey Carbery (born 1995), Irish rugby union player
- Mary Carbery (1867-1949), English author
- Spencer Carbery (born 1981), Canadian ice hockey player
- Thomas Carbery (1791–1863), mayor of Washington, D.C.

Places

- Carbery (barony), former barony in County Cork, Ireland; location of:—
  - Carbery East, barony
  - Carbery West, barony
  - Carbery's Hundred Isles, archipelago
  - Ross Carbery, town
- Carbury (County Kildare barony), location of:—
  - Carbury, County Kildare, village
  - Carbury Castle, County Kildare
- Carbury, County Sligo, barony
- Carbury, North Dakota, USA, unincorporated community in Bottineau County

Titles

- Baron Carbery, title in the Peerage of Ireland
- Earl of Carbery, title in the Peerage of Ireland
- Princes of Carbery, Gaelic title of the MacCarthy Reagh

Sports

- Carbery GAA, County Cork Gaelic games division
- Carbery Rangers GAA, in Ross Carbery, County Cork
- Carbury GAA, club in County Kildare

== See also ==
- Carberry (disambiguation), similar spelling
- Cairbre (disambiguation), Irish-language equivalent
