= Gartmore House =

Country house in Gartmore, Stirling, Scotland

Coordinates: 56.14805°N 4.37005°W

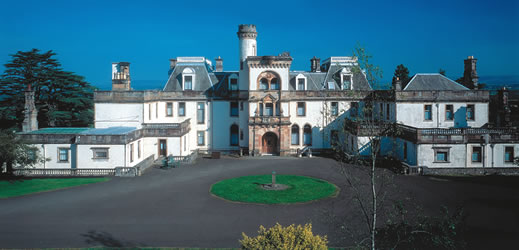
Entrance of Gartmore House

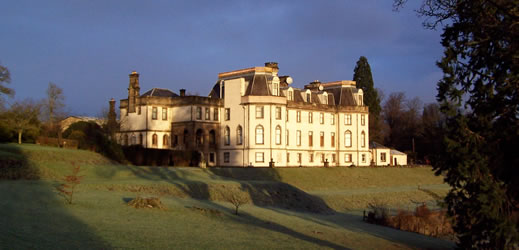
Rear of Gartmore House

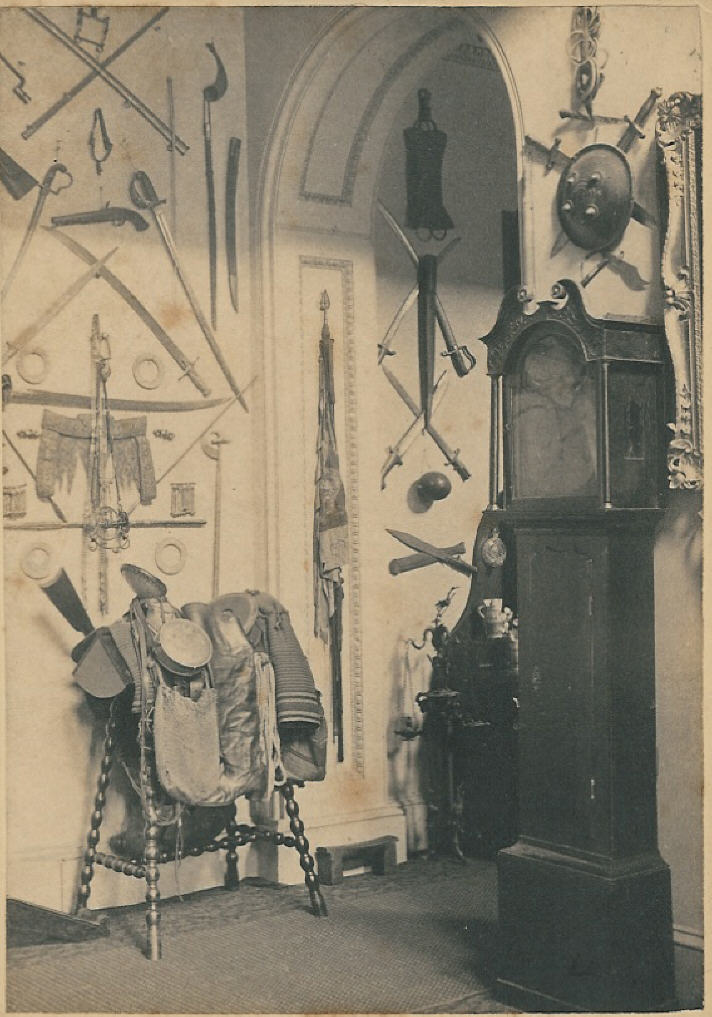
Hall circa 1890

Gartmore House is a country house and estate in the village of Gartmore, Stirling, Scotland. It was built in the mid-18th century for the Graham family on the site of an earlier house. William Adam prepared plans for Nicol Graham of Gartmore in the 1740s, but according to Historic Scotland, it is doubtful that he designed the house as built. The house was enlarged for Nicol's son, Robert Graham of Gartmore by John Baxter Junior in 1779-80.

Gartmore became the home of Robert Bontine Cunninghame Graham (1852–1936) in 1883. He was forced to sell the estate in 1900 to pay death duties. The estate was then bought by Sir Charles Cayzer. It was partly redesigned by David Barclay, who added the tower, altered the roof and redesigned the western front, in 1901-1902. Internally, the main stairs were relocated in the centre of the house and the staircase is substantial, timber (which Cayzer claimed came from the Spanish Armada) with balustrades and newel posts which reflect Mannerist forms. Stained glass added by Cayzer was designed by Stephen Adam.

The house was commandeered by the Army in the 1940s, and became a barracks until 1950. After the war, the Cayzer family did not take the house back and it was sold off in pieces.

In 1953, the Archdiocese of Glasgow bought the house to establish St. Ninian's, a list D school run by the De La Salle Brothers, a Roman Catholic religious order. During this period the house was the site of numerous cases of child abuse, perpetrated by the staff of St. Ninians. These cases did not come to light until several decades later.

Between 1983 and 1985 Gartmore House lay dormant, and was then bought by The Way in GB Ltd as a European base for The Way International. From 1995 to 1997 Gartmore House was again empty until it was bought by Peter and Anne Sunderland in conjunction with Cloverley Hall, and became a conference and activity centre. In 2000, Cloverly Hall was bought over and Gartmore House became a charitable trust. Then, in 2004, it was joined with Carberry Tower in East Lothian. Gartmore House is now a conference centre, used by groups including schools, orchestras and religious groups. Recently, the oil fuel system was replaced by a Biomass heating system in an attempt to reduce carbon emissions. The house is a Category B listed building.
