= Extreme points of Scotland =

Map of the extreme points of Scotland.

This is a list of the extreme points and extreme elevations in Scotland.

The northernmost and westernmost points of Scotland coincide with those of the UK (both for the mainland and including the islands).

== General ==
- Northernmost point – Out Stack (Oosta), Shetland at 60°51′N 0°52′W
- Northernmost settlement – Skaw, Unst, Shetland at 60°49′N 0°47′W
- Southernmost point – Mull of Galloway, Wigtownshire at 54°38′N 4°52′W
- Southernmost settlement – Cairngaan, Wigtownshire at 54°38′N 4°54′W
- Westernmost point – Rockall (Sgeir Rocail) at 57°35′N 13°41′W (Note: Rockall is claimed by several countries, including the UK (as part of Scotland's Outer Hebrides). If Rockall is not considered part of the UK, then Soay, Saint Kilda, west of the Outer Hebrides, is the westernmost point.)
- Westernmost settlement – Caolas, Bhatarsaigh (Vatersay), Outer Hebrides at 56°56′N 7°32′W (Note: The village on Hirta, St Kilda was abandoned in 1930, and was until then the westernmost settlement in Scotland. The island now has a military base, and is staffed during the summer months.)
- Easternmost point – Bound Skerry, Out Skerries, Shetland Islands at 60°25′N 0°43′W
- Easternmost settlement – Bruray, Out Skerries, Shetland Islands at 60°26′N 0°45′W

== Mainland ==
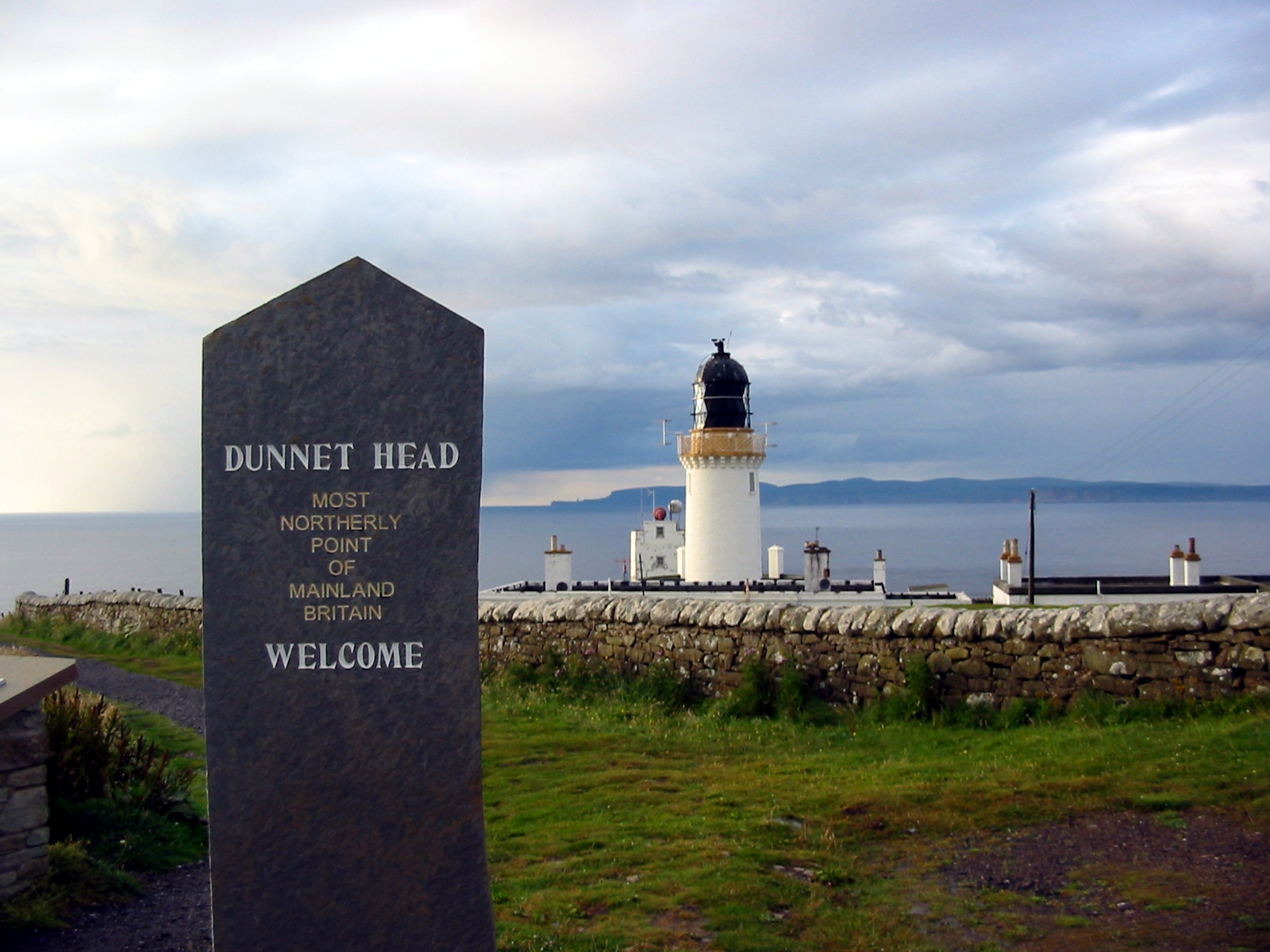
"Most northerly point of mainland Britain."

- Northernmost point – Dunnet Head at 58°40′N 3°22′W, Caithness, Highland, Scotland
- Northernmost settlement – Skarfskerry, Caithness, Highland, Scotland at 58°39′N 3°15′W
- Southernmost point – Mull of Galloway, Wigtownshire at 54°38′N 4°52′W
- Southernmost settlement – Cairngaan, Wigtownshire at 54°38′N 4°54′W
- Westernmost point – Corrachadh Mòr, Highland at 56°42′N 6°13′W (Note: The opening of the Skye Bridge on 16 October 1995 means that Skye could be regarded as part of the British mainland, which - using this definition - would make the westernmost point of mainland Britain a spot 200 m (220 yd) south of the Neist Point Lighthouse, Skye, at 57°25′N 6°47′W.)
- Westernmost settlement – Grigadale, Highland at 56°43′N 6°11′W
- Easternmost point – Keith Inch, Aberdeenshire at 57°30′N 1°46′W
- Easternmost settlement – Peterhead, Aberdeenshire at 57°30′N 1°46′W

== Centre point ==
The centre point of Scotland is located between Blair Atholl and Dalwhinnie, Perthshire (56°49′0.257″N 4°11′2.267″W; grid reference NN6678471599) (Note: A 2002 study by the Ordnance Survey pinpointed the centre more precisely, and it is their results that are quoted here. However, this is obviously dependent on whether or not Scotland's islands are included, and there is more than one way to measure it.)

Schiehallion, a mountain in Perthshire, is sometimes described as the centre of Scotland.

== Elevation extremes ==
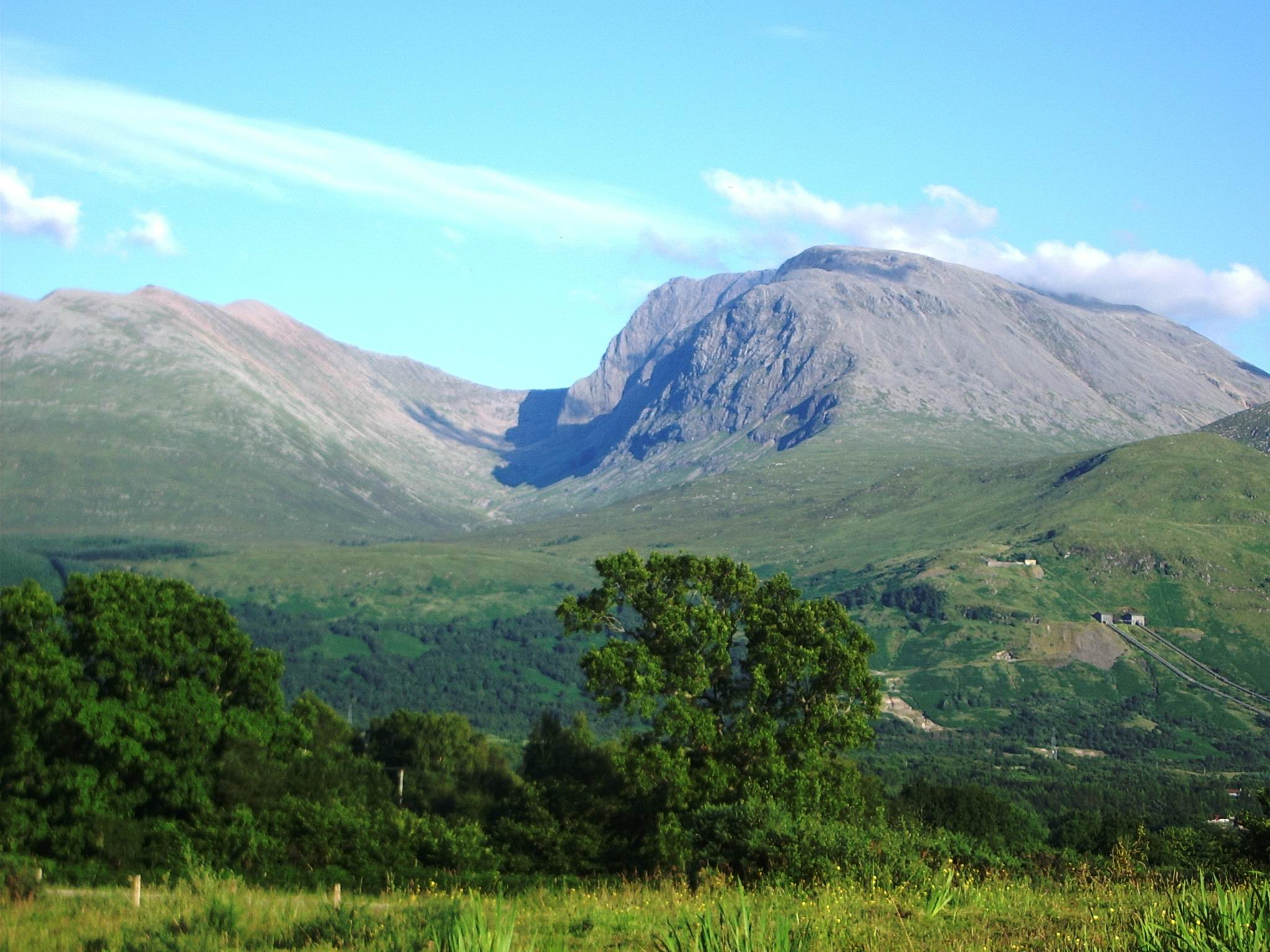
At 1,345 metres, Ben Nevis is the highest peak in Scotland.

The highest point in Scotland is the summit of Ben Nevis, at an elevation of 1,345 m (4,413 ft).

The ten tallest mountains in the UK are all found in Scotland.

Wanlockhead claims to be the highest settlement in Scotland, at 410 m (1,350 ft) above sea level.

Many points are on, or near sea level, but due to high rainfall, there are no natural dry pieces of land below sea level - see rivers and lochs below.

== Rivers and lochs ==
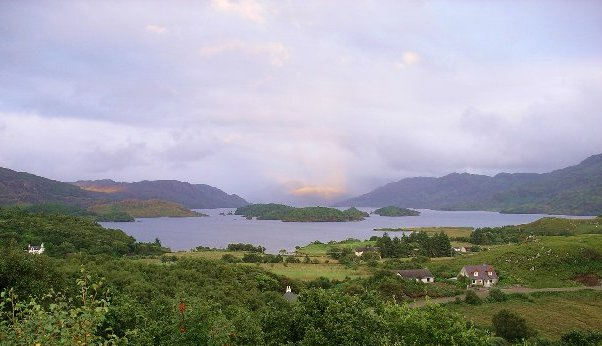
Loch Morar

The longest river in Scotland is the River Tay, at 188 km (117 mi) in length.

The largest freshwater loch in Scotland by surface area is Loch Lomond, with a surface area of 71 km^{2} (27.4 sq mi).

The largest freshwater loch in Scotland by volume is Loch Ness, with a volume of 7.5 km^{3} (1.8 cu mi).

The deepest freshwater loch is Loch Morar, with a maximum depth of 309 metres (1,014 ft).

== See also ==
- Extreme points of the British Isles
- Extreme points of Ireland
- John o' Groats
