= Hermaness =

Headland on Unst, Shetland Islands, Scotland

Hermaness National Nature Reserve
- IUCN category IV (habitat/species management area)
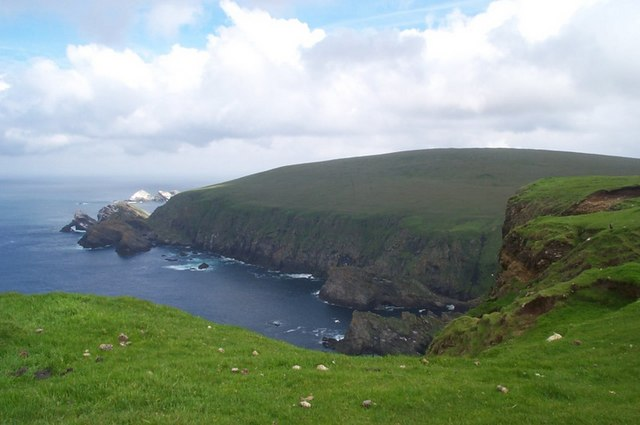
- View north from Toolie

- Location within Shetland
- Location: Shetland, Scotland
- Coordinates: 60°50′14″N 0°53′0″W
- Area: 964.4 ha (2,383 acres)
- Designation: NatureScot
- Established: 1955
- Website: Hermaness National Nature Reserve

Hermaness (Shaetlan pronunciation: [ˈhɛrməˌnɛs] HER-mə-NESS) is the northernmost headland of Unst, the most northerly inhabited island of Shetland, Scotland. It consists of huge sea cliffs and moorland, making it an ideal habitat for a variety of birds. Hermaness was designated a national nature reserve (NNR) in 1955. The NNR extends over 965 hectares, including the whole of the Hermaness peninsula and the outlying Muckle Flugga and Out Stack. The reserve has a path and boardwalk that extends out onto the moorland. The reserve is managed by NatureScot, though it remains in private ownership, with most being owned by the Buness Estate, although the stacks and skerries around Muckle Flugga are owned by the Northern Lighthouse Board.

Hermaness is renowned for its internationally important seabird colonies, including the world's third largest great skua colony, fulmars, gannets, shags, puffins and guillemots. The blanket bog further inland also provides a good habitat for breeding waders, such as golden plover, dunlin and snipe.

== Legend ==
Hermaness is said to have once been home to a giant named Herman who fought with another giant, named Saxa, over a mermaid. During the fight the two giants threw rocks at each other, and the legend claims that this is the origin of the rocks and stacks that surround the headland and leading to the formation of Hermaness and Muckle Flugga. The mermaid outwitted Herman and Saxa by tricking them into swimming with her to the northern Atlantic Ocean where both giants drowned since they can't swim.

== Birdlife ==
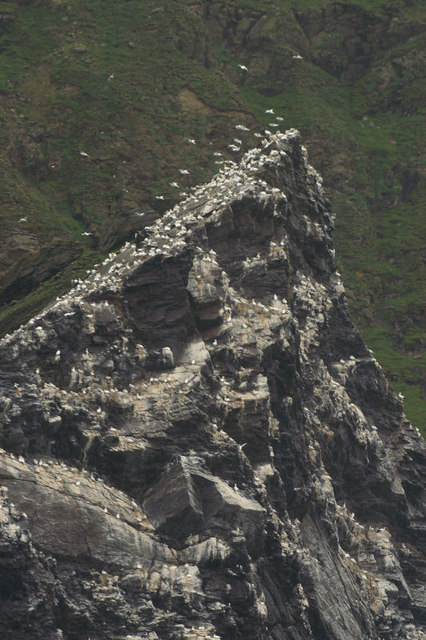
Gannets on Humla Stack

The site forms part of the Hermaness, Saxa Vord and Valla Field Important Bird Area (IBA), designated as such by BirdLife International. Over 100,000 pairs of birds from 15 different species breed at Hermaness, which is internationally important for great skua, gannets and puffins. Gannets nest on narrow ledges on cliffs and stacks, and as of 2018 there were around 26,000 breeding pairs each summer. Hermaness, with around 6% of the breeding North Atlantic population, is the sixth largest colony of these birds in Britain. Guillemot and kittiwake also breed on the stacks and cliffs of Hermaness, with around 3,700 pairs of guillemot and 416 pairs of kittiwake recorded in 2015. Shags nest on boulder beaches on the west coast of Hermaness; due to relative inaccessibility of these areas counting is difficult, but NatureScot estimated a population of around 150 pairs in 2002.

The fulmar population, numbering almost 7,000 pairs in 2011, is nationally important, representing 1% of the British population. Puffins can be difficult to count due to the fact they nest in burrows, however NatureScot estimate that somewhere between 20,000 and 30,000 pairs can be found at Hermaness, representing around 6% of the British population. The coastline also hosts small numbers of breeding herring gulls, razorbills and black guillemots, all of whom tend to nest in more secluded areas such rock crevices and amongst boulders.

Away from the coast, almost 1,000 great skuas, known locally as bonxies, nest at Hermaness, maintaining territories on the large expanse of moorland that covers the centre of the peninsula. Hermaness is estimated to host 4.5% of world population of these birds, and is the third largest colony in Europe. Until the 1960s large numbers of Arctic skuas also bred at Hermaness, however a rise in bonxie numbers led to these birds tending to favour other parts of Unst. A small number of red-throated divers (typically 3-9 pairs), breed on the moors. The moorland also provides a home for many other ground-nesting birds such as skylark, twite and curlew. There are also significant numbers of waders, with large numbers of dunlin and snipe, and smaller numbers of golden plover. In recent years greylag geese have also begun to nest at Hermaness.

Hermaness was also home to a black-browed albatross – an extreme rarity in the Northern Hemisphere – every summer from 1972 until 1995 (except 1988 and 1989). This bird, nicknamed 'Albert', proved a major attraction to birdwatchers.

== Other wildlife ==
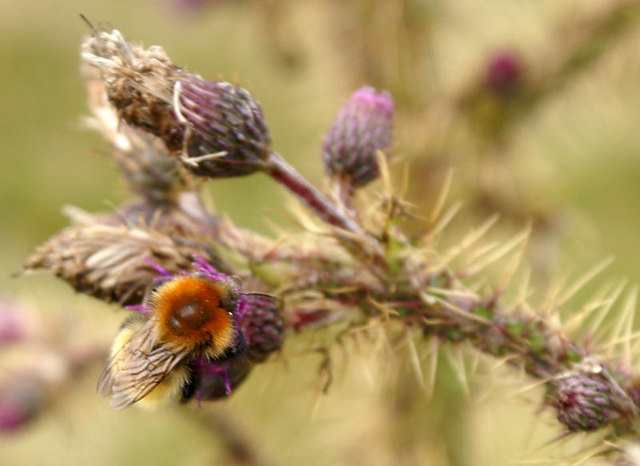
The Shetland bumblebee, Bombus muscorum agricolae

Otter can occasionally be seen at Hermaness, and the Shetland field mouse can also be found. Otherwise, few land mammals live on the peninsula. In contrast, the surrounding seas are home to many marine mammals such as seals, dolphins, whales and porpoises. Both grey and common seals visit the beaches regularly, and sightings of whales and dolphins have increased in recent years. Harbour porpoises, minke whales, killer whales, white-sided dolphins, white-beaked dolphins and Risso’s dolphins are all known to visit.

Moths species at Hermaness include the northern rustic, the autumnal rustic and the northern arches. Many of these moths belong to distinct sub-species found only in Shetland, often being darker in colour than those found on the Scottish mainland. Other invertebrates include 53 species of beetle, 46 species of spider, and the distinctive, orange-coloured Shetland bumblebee.

== Conservation ==
Conservation activities began at Hermaness in 1831, when the landowner, Dr. Lawrence Edmondston, began to protect bonxie nesting sites from egg collectors: by this time the population had declined to only 3 pairs. The population began to recover, but egg collecting remained an issue. In 1891 the Edmondston family employed a warden to protect the site, and from this point bonxie numbers grew strongly. Responsibility for watching the bonxies passed to the Royal Society for the Protection of Birds (RSPB) in 1906, and the role was widened to include monitoring of other seabird populations. In 1955 part of the area was declared a national nature reserve, and the reserve was extended to its current extent in 1958. At this point the Nature Conservancy Council (the predecessor of NatureScot), took over responsibility for monitoring the bird population. Since the 1980s seabird counts have been conducted on a systematic basis, and a whole-reserve count of the main species is undertaken every 6 years.

In addition to being an NNR, the headland holds a range of other conservation designations for its spectacular wildlife, habitat and geological features. It is also a Site of Special Scientific Interest (SSSI), and forms part of the Hermaness, Saxa Vord and Valla Field Special Protection Area (SPA) and the Shetland national scenic area. The Hermaness NNR is classified as a Category IV protected area by the International Union for Conservation of Nature.

== Watchers Hut ==
Once the Royal Society for the Protection of Birds took over the protection of the bonxie population in 1906, they built a hut on the southern slopes of Hermaness Hill overlooking the nesting sites to accommodate their "Watchers". This hut burnt down after a few years and was subsequently replaced by a slightly larger one which survived until 1991. It was constructed of corrugated iron on a wooden frame with windows facing south.

For many years, Watchers were resident during the breeding season until the bonxie population had recovered. After they were no longer required, the hut continued to be maintained as a place of refuge in bad weather and for use by researchers or people overnighting. It also contained the Bird Sanctuary Visitor’s Book.

On 31 December 1991, an Englishman and his Canadian girlfriend hiked to the hut with the intention of seeing in the New Year there. That night, or in the early hours of 1 January 1992, the hut was struck by one of the most severe storms ever recorded in the British Isles with winds reaching Hurricane force, gusting up to 150 knots (280 km/h; 170 mph) as measured at the nearby Muckle Flugga Lighthouse. The hut was blown away and completely destroyed, with debris scattered over the hillside and both lost their lives. The man was found on 5 January close to where the hut had been, his girlfriend half a mile (800m) away below a 300 ft (90m) cliff in Burra Firth the following day.

Today, the site of the hut is marked by a cross made of large stones laid into the ground, a memorial for the two lives lost. Access to the location is currently problematic, as the direct footpath to the top of Hermaness Hill that passed the cross closed in 2017. It traversed fragile blanket bog that was being severely eroded by the increased number of visitors. However, there are plans to reopen this route in the future after installation of boardwalks. The current footpath takes a different westerly route.
