= Land's End =

Headland and tourist attraction in Cornwall, England

Coordinates: 50°04′07″N 05°42′58″W

Land's End: Cornish: Penn an Wlas / Pedn an Wlas
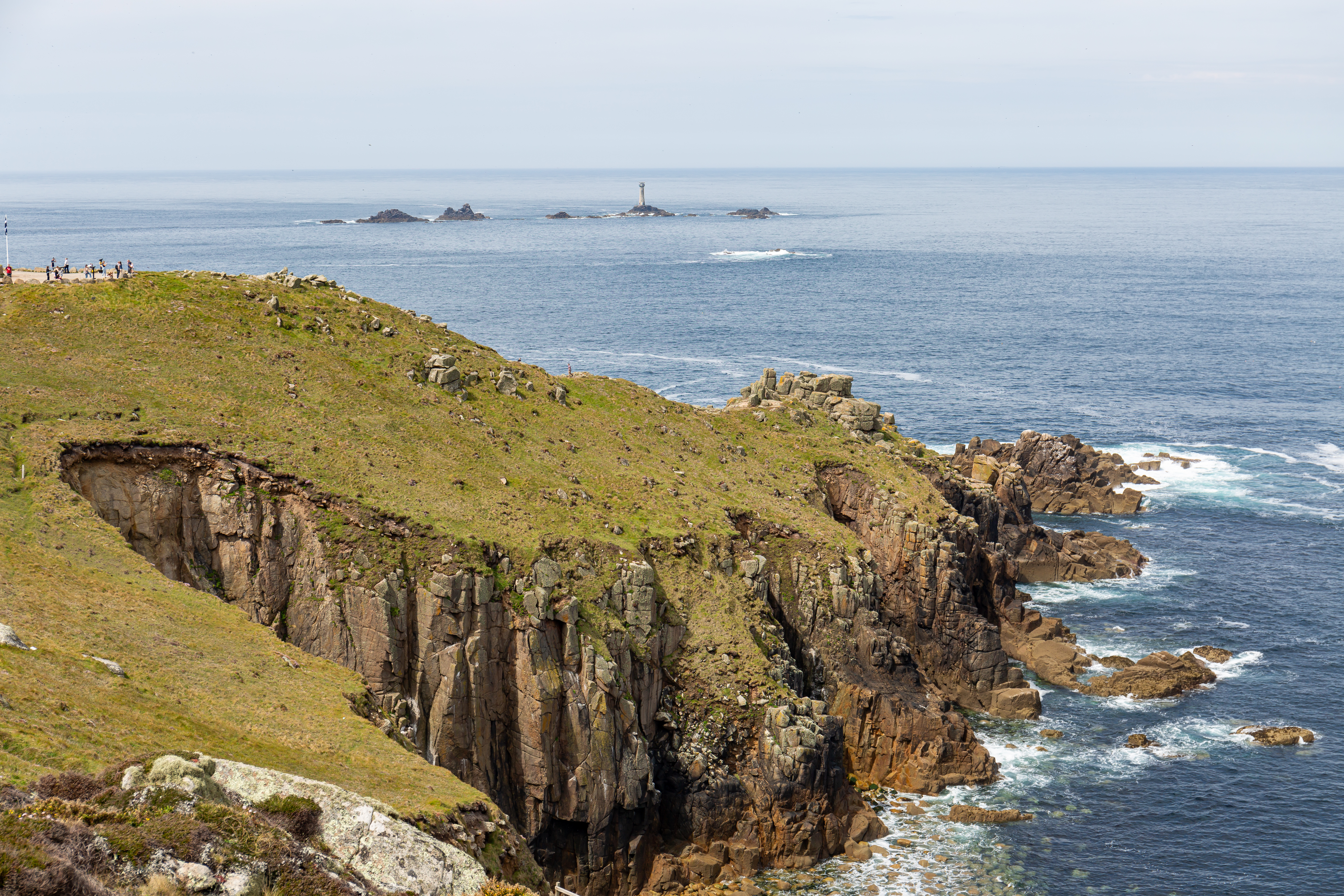
- Cliffs at Land's End, showing Dr Syntax's Head and Longships Lighthouse

- Location within Cornwall
- OS grid reference: SW 34177 25339
- Unitary authority: Cornwall
- Ceremonial county: Cornwall
- Region: South West
- Country: England
- Sovereign state: United Kingdom
- Post town: PENZANCE
- Postcode district: TR19
- Dialling code: 01736
- Police: Devon and Cornwall
- Fire: Cornwall
- Ambulance: South Western
- UK Parliament: St Ives

Land's End (Cornish: Penn an Wlas or Pedn an Wlas) is a headland and tourist and holiday complex in western Cornwall, England, United Kingdom, on the Penwith peninsula about eight miles (13 km) west-south-west of Penzance at the western end of the A30 road. To the east of it is the English Channel, and to the west the Celtic Sea.

Land's End is the most westerly point of mainland England and the most south-westerly point in Great Britain. However, it is not the westernmost point on mainland Great Britain. This title goes to Corrachadh Mòr in the Scottish Highlands, which is 37 km (23 mi) further West.

== Geography ==
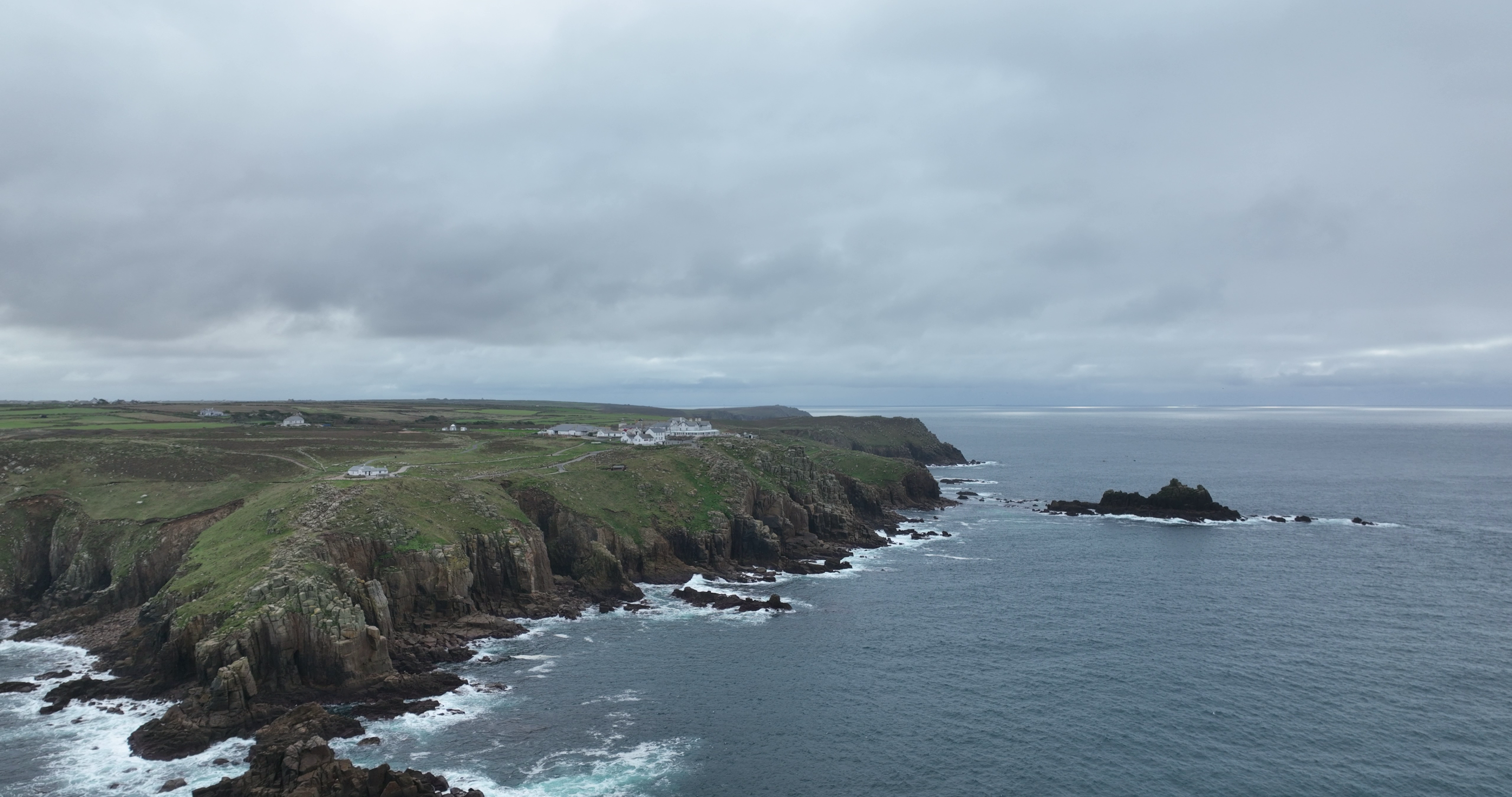
Cliffs and coastline at Land’s End, Cornwall, England from the sea.

The actual Land's End, or Peal Point, is a modest headland compared with nearby headlands such as Pedn-men-dhu overlooking Sennen Cove and Pordenack, to the south. The present hotel and tourist complex is at Carn Kez, 200 yards (180 m) south of the actual Land's End. Land's End has a particular resonance because it is often used to suggest distance. Land's End to John o' Groats in Scotland is a distance of 838 miles (1,349 km) by road and this Land's End to John o' Groats distance is often used to define charitable events such as end-to-end walks and races in the UK. Land's End to the northernmost point of England is a distance of 556 miles (895 km) by road.

The westernmost promontory at Land's End is known as Dr Syntax's Head. The character Dr Syntax was invented by the writer William Combe in his 1809 comic verse The Tour of Dr Syntax in Search of the Picturesque, which satirised the work of seekers of the "picturesque" such as William Gilpin. A nearby promontory is called Dr Johnson's Head after Samuel Johnson, who referred to a hypothetical Cornish declaration of independence in his 1775 essay Taxation no Tyranny.

The area around Land's End has been designated part of an Important Plant Area, by the organisation Plantlife, for rare species of flora.

Land's End is a popular venue for rock climbers.

The Longships, a group of rocky islets are just over 1 mile (1.6 km) offshore, and together with the Seven Stones Reef and the Isles of Scilly which lie about 28 miles (45 km) southwest – are part of the mythical lost land of Lyonesse, referred to in Arthurian literature.

== Geology ==
The cliffs are made of granite, an igneous rock, which means they are resistant to weathering and have steep cliff faces. There are two varieties of granite represented at Land's End. Adjacent to the hotel, the granite is coarse-grained with large phenocrysts of orthoclase, sometimes more than 5 in (13 cm) in length. To the north, at the First and Last House, there is a finer-grained granite with fewer and smaller phenocrysts, and the different granites can be seen from a distance by the smoother weathering of the finer variety. The granite dates to 268–275 million years ago of the Permian period. The contact zone between the Land's End granite pluton and the altered "country rocks" is nearby and the Longships Lighthouse, offshore, is built on the country rock.

== History ==
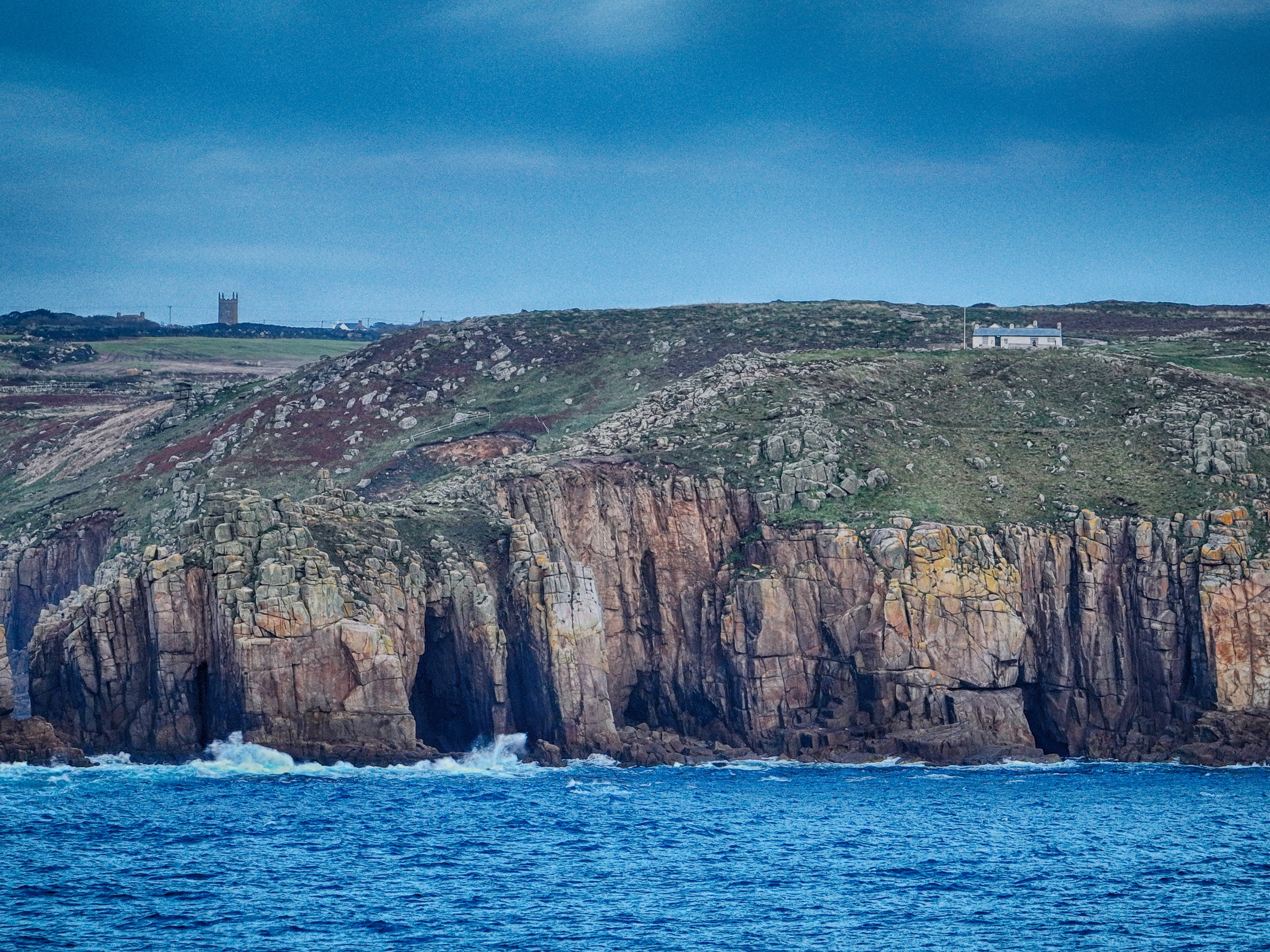
The First and Last House near Land's End, Cornwall, viewed from the sea

In 1769, the antiquarian William Borlase wrote:

Of this time we are to understand what Edward I. says (Sheringham. p. 129.) that Britain, Wales, and Cornwall, were the portion of Belinus, elder son of Dunwallo, and that that part of the Island, afterwards called England, was divided in three shares, viz. Britain, which reached from the Tweed, Westward, as far as the river Ex; Wales enclosed by the rivers Severn, and Dee; and Cornwall from the river Ex to the Land's-End.

Tourists have been visiting Land's End for over three hundred years. In 1649, an early visitor was the poet John Taylor, who was hoping to find subscribers for his new book Wanderings to see the Wonders of the West. In 1878 people left Penzance by horse-drawn vehicles from outside the Queens and Union hotels and travelled via St Buryan and Treen, to see the Logan Rock. There was a short stop to look at Porthcurno and the Eastern Telegraph Company followed by refreshments at the First and Last Inn in Sennen. They then headed for Land's End, often on foot or horse, because of the uneven and muddy lanes. Over one hundred people could be at Land's End at any one time. At Carn Kez, the First and Last Inn owned a small house which looked after the horses while visitors roamed the cliffs. The house at Carn Kez developed into the present hotel. The earliest part of the house was damaged by the Luftwaffe when a plane returning from a raid on Cardiff jettisoned its remaining bombs. 53 fishermen were injured or killed. In the build-up to D-Day, American troops were billeted in the hotel, leaving the building in a bad state.

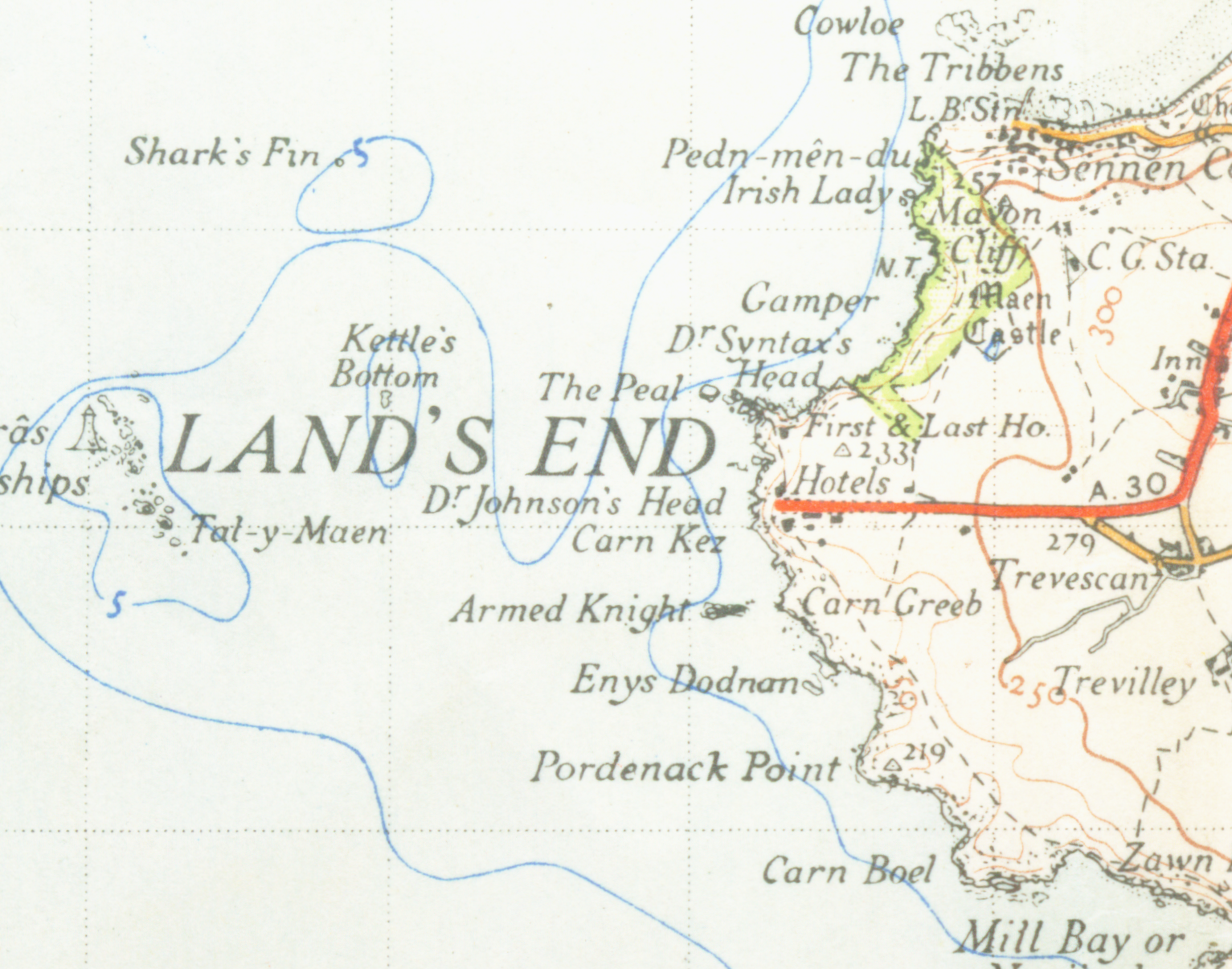
A 1946 map of Land's End

Land's End was owned by a Cornish family until 1982, when it was sold to David Goldstone. In 1987, Peter de Savary outbid the National Trust to purchase Land's End for almost £7 million from David Goldstone. He had two new buildings erected and much of the present theme park development was instigated by him. He sold both Land's End and John o' Groats to businessman Graham Ferguson Lacey in 1991. The current owners purchased Land's End in 1996 and formed a company named Heritage Great Britain PLC. Attractions at the theme park include children's playgrounds and recorded music. Twice a week in August, Land's End hosts 'Magic in the Skies', a night-time firework spectacular with music by British composer Christopher Bond and narrated by actress Miriam Margolyes. Within the complex is the Land's End Hotel.

On 6 May 1985, four schoolchildren died in what is known as the Land's End disaster.

In May 2012, Land's End received worldwide publicity as the starting point of the 2012 Summer Olympics torch relay.

=== End to end ===
Land's End is either the start or finishing point of end-to-end journeys with John o' Groats in Scotland. One of the earliest was by R. H. Carlisle, who left Land's End on 23 September 1879, went to John O'Groats House and arrived back at Land's End on 15 December, taking 72 days (exclusive of Sundays); covering 3,899 miles (6,275 km). To prove his journey, he kept a log book which was stamped at any post office he passed. An early end-to-end on bicycle was completed by Messrs Blackwell and Harman of Canonbury Bicycle Club. Starting at Land's End, they covered 900 miles (1,400 km) in thirteen days in July/August 1880. Nearly two years later the Hon I Keith-Falconer travelled 994 miles (1,600 km) from Land's End, in twelve days, 23 1/4 hours, on a bicycle.

== Greeb ==
On the south side of Carn Kez the land slopes away to a shallow valley containing a small stream and the former Greeb Farm. In 1879 a derrick was used for hauling seaweed from the beach 40 feet below for use as a soil improver.

== Portrayal in literature, music and film ==
- On the 1980 album Gradually Going Tornado by British jazzrock band Bruford, "Land's End", a song written by keyboardist Dave Stewart lasting 10.20 mins, is featured.

== Gallery ==
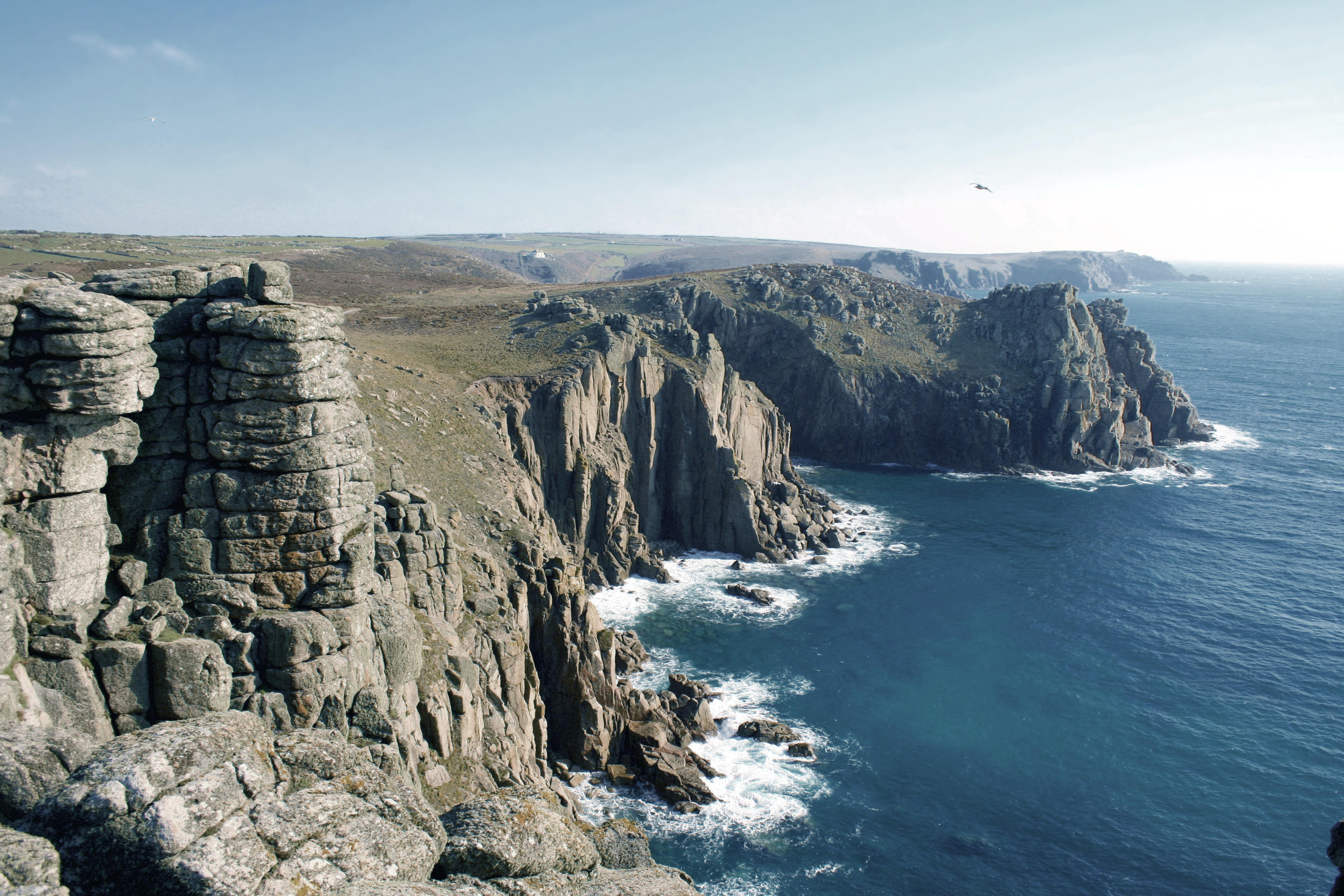
Cliffs at Land's End

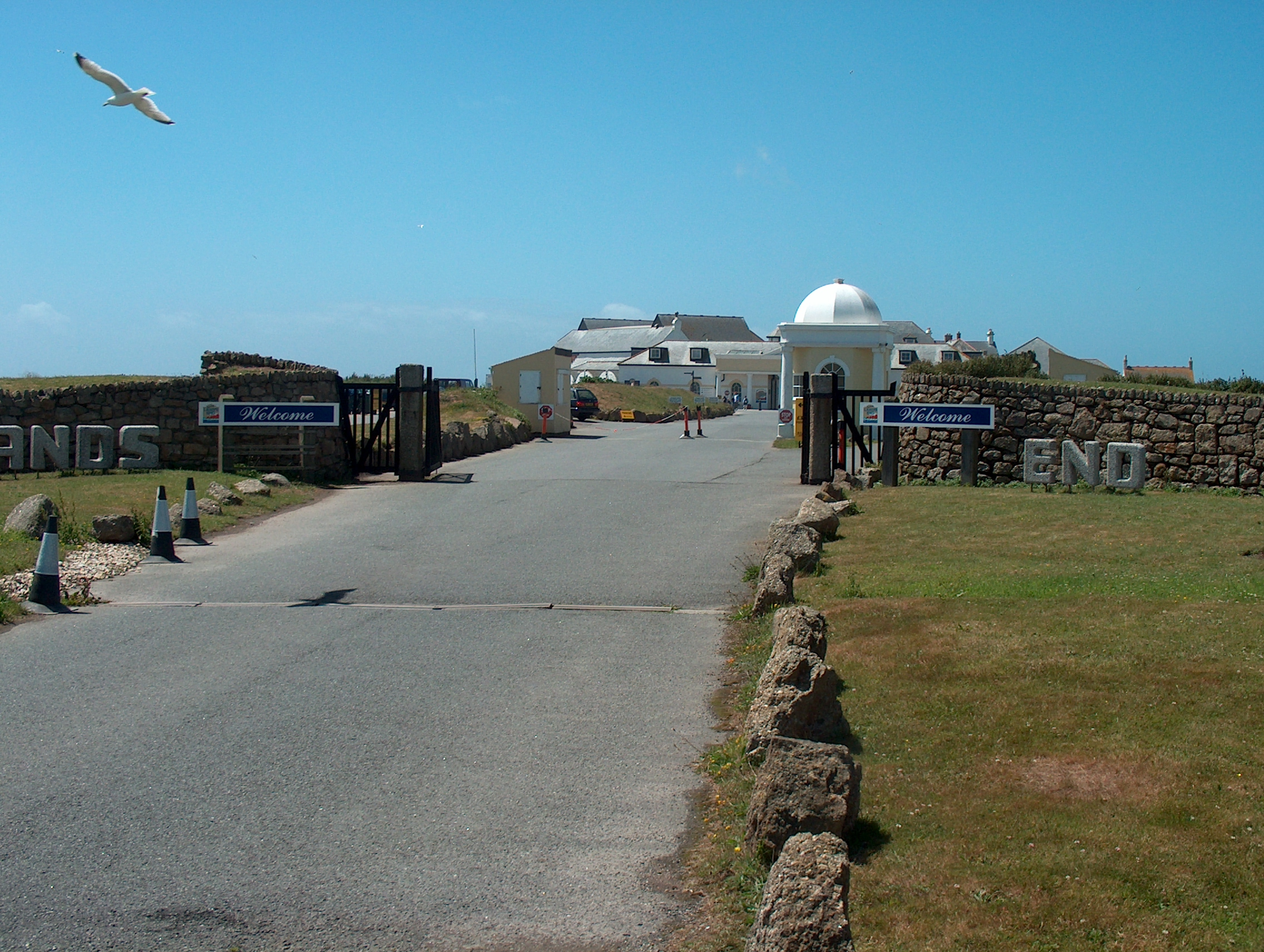
The tourist centre at Land's End

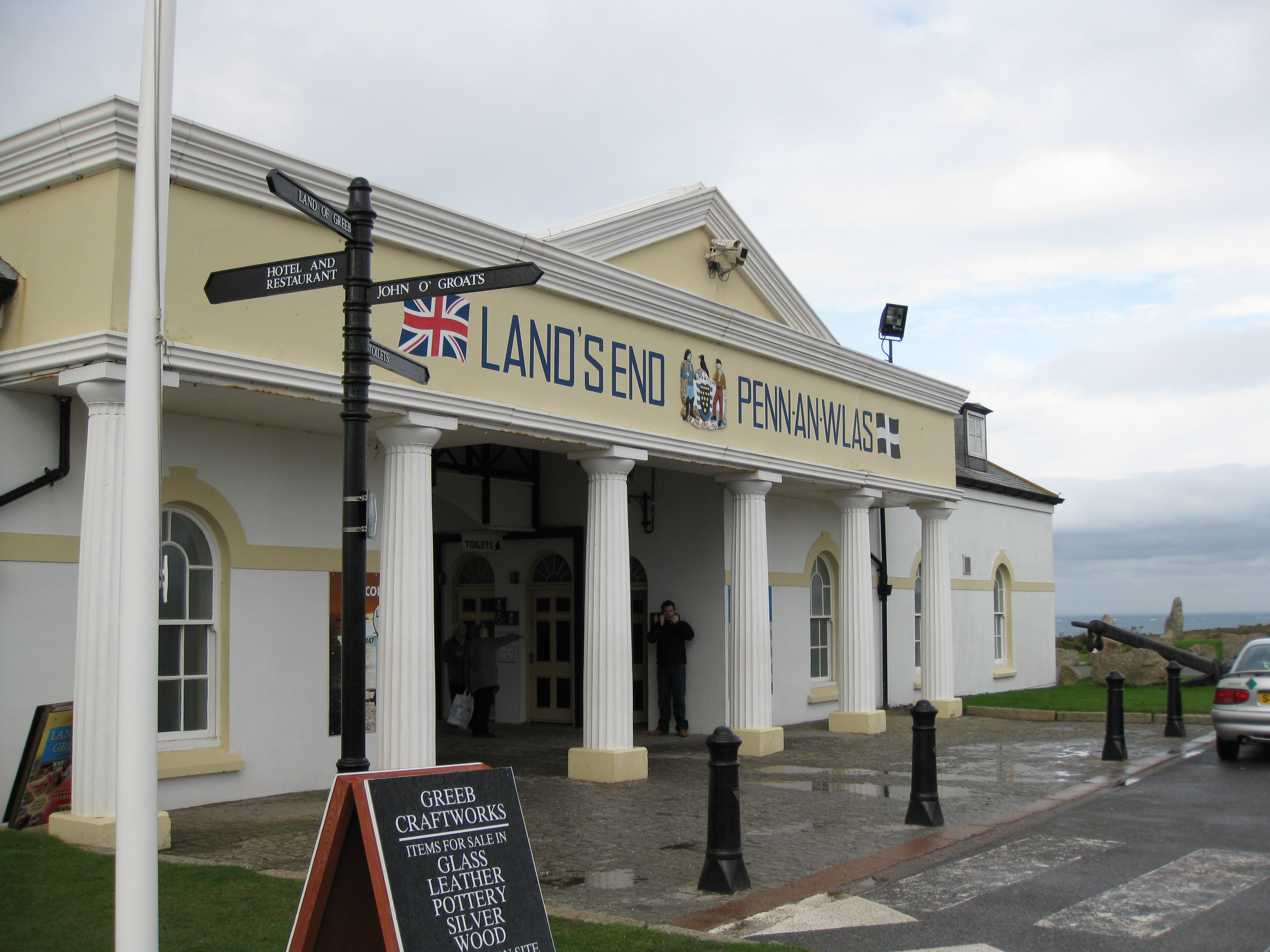
The tourist centre at Land's End

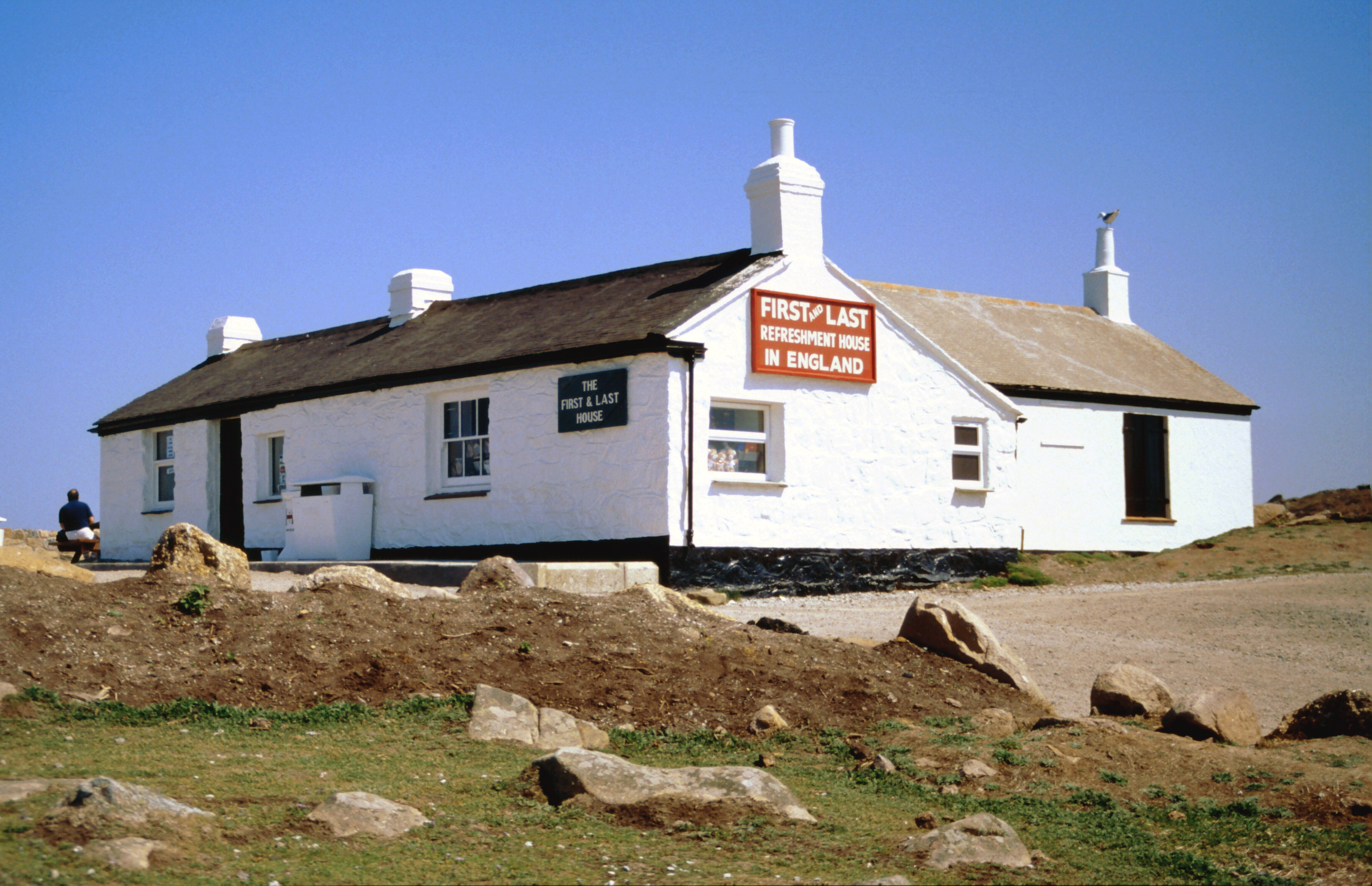
The old refreshment house

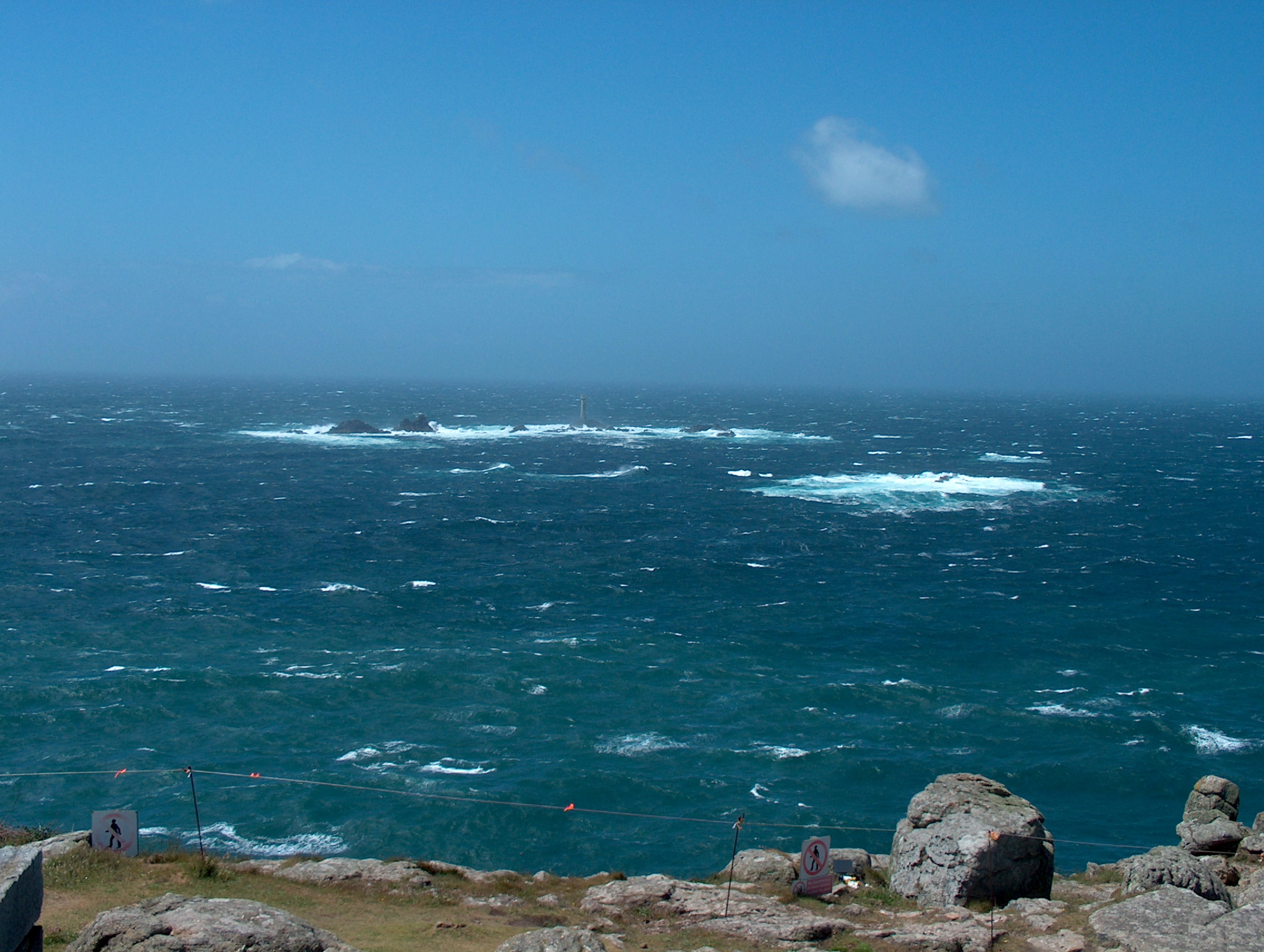
The Longships Lighthouse off Land's End

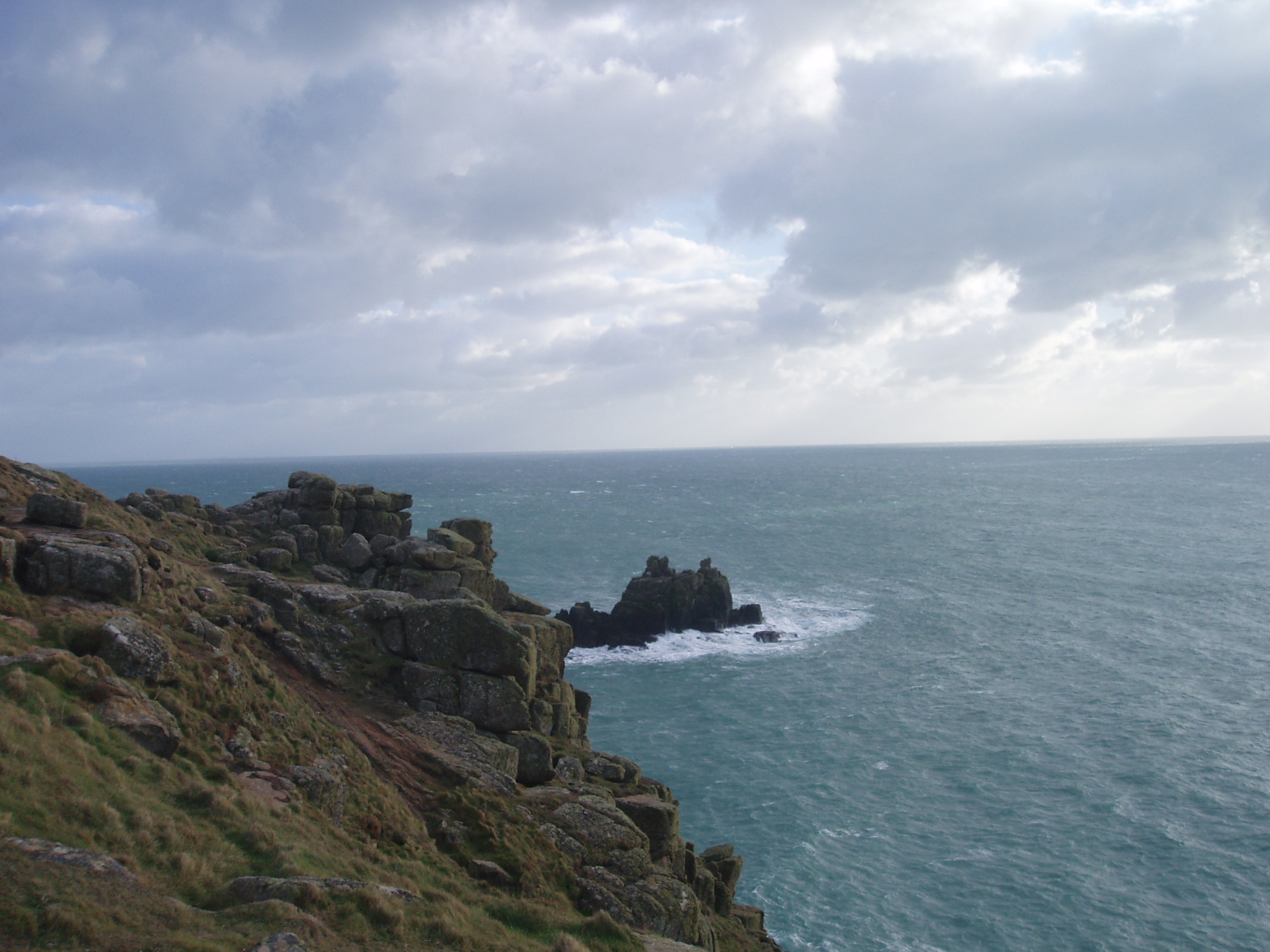
Looking south from Land's End

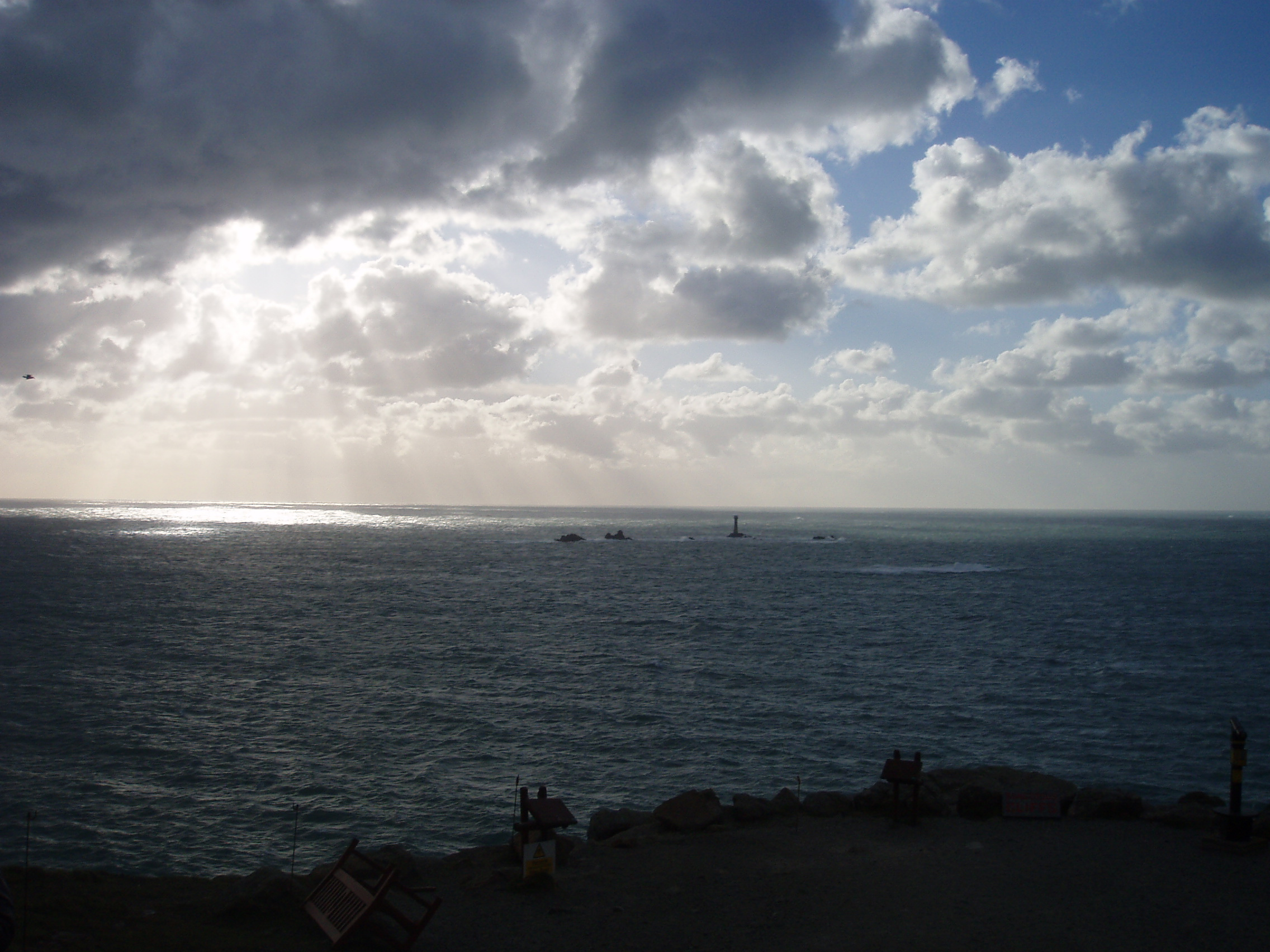
Looking west from Land's End

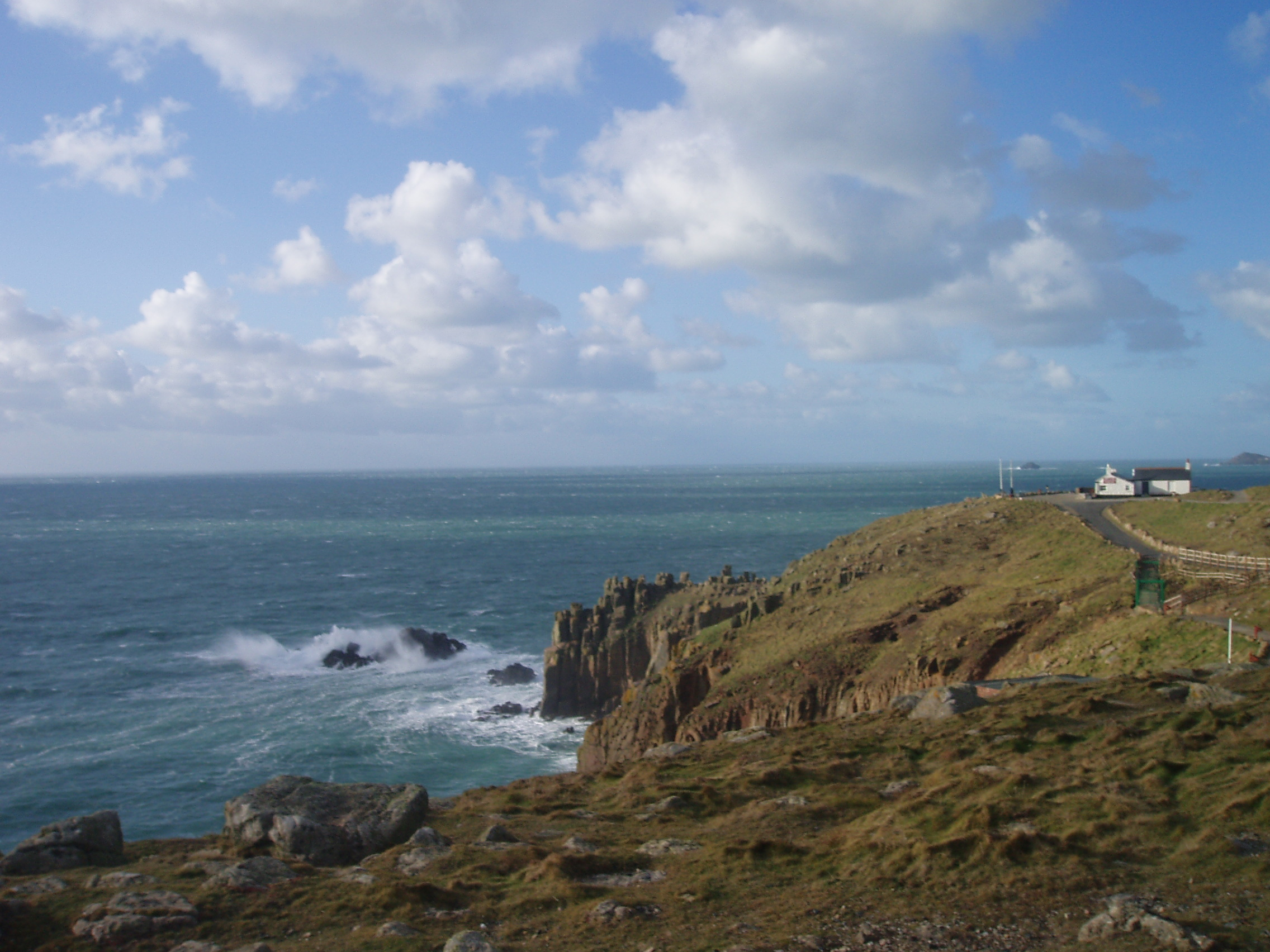
Looking north from Land's End

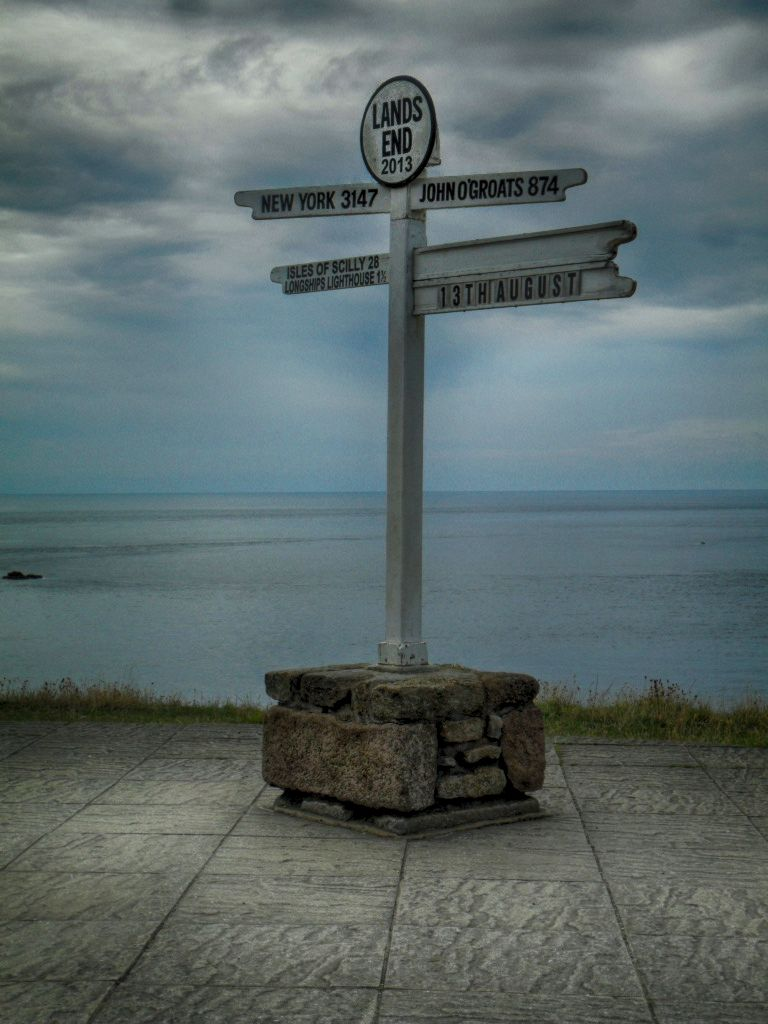
Signpost at Land's End

== See also ==
- Corrachadh Mòr, the most westerly point in Great Britain
- Cape Finisterre
- Cape St. Vincent, southwesternmost point of continental Europe.
- John o' Groats
- Land's End Airport
- Land's End to John o' Groats
- Lizard Point, southernmost point of mainland England
- Marshall Meadows Bay, northernmost point of England
- Ness Point, easternmost point of England
- Sennen, the nearest village
