= Grigadale =

Landform in North-west Scotland

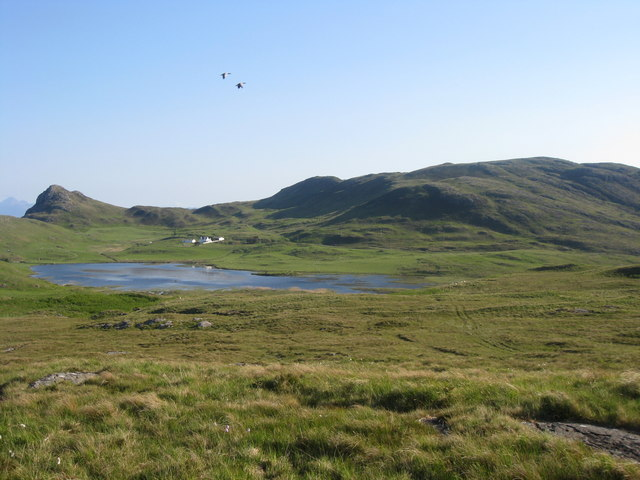
Loch Grigadale with Grigadale behind; the distant hill furthest left is Askival on Rùm

Grigadale (Scottish Gaelic: Griogadal), in Ardnamurchan in the Highland Council Area, Scotland, is the most westerly area on the mainland of Great Britain.

The lighthouse at Ardnamurchan Point, and Corrachadh Mòr, the most westerly point on the island of Great Britain, are about 1.5 km (0.93 mi) to the west.

It is located at grid reference NM431670, or 56°43.4′N 6°12.1′W. The nearest airport at Inverness, is over 4 hours-drive by car.

== See also ==
- Extreme points of Scotland
