= Ardnamurchan Point =

Most westerly area on the island of Great Britain

- Peninsula
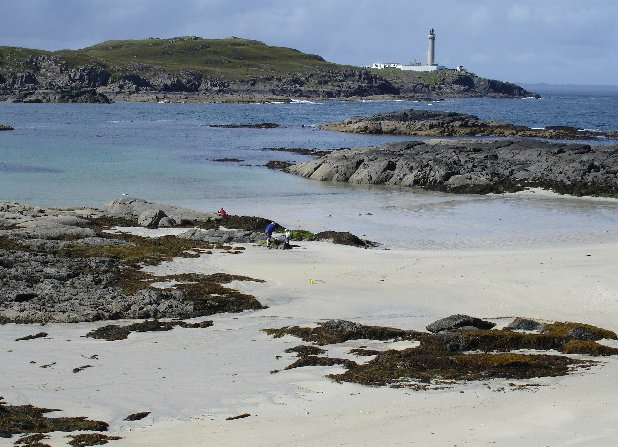
- Ardnamurchan Point across Eilean Chaluim Cille

- Location within Scotland
- Coordinates: 56.726°N 6.224°W
- Grid position: NM416674
- Location: Highland, Scotland

Ardnamurchan Point (Scottish Gaelic: Rubha Àird nam Murchan, meaning "the headland of the hill of the great sea") is a peninsula in Highland, Scotland where the Ardnamurchan Lighthouse is situated.

== Location ==
Ardnamurchan Point lies at the western end of the Ardnamurchan peninsula in Lochaber, Highland, Scotland. Ardnamurchan Lighthouse is located on the Point, just over 2/3 of a mile (1 km) north of Corrachadh Mòr, the most westerly point on the island of Great Britain, which is a few metres further west than the Point. The nearest settlements are the crofting townships of Portuairk 1.2 miles (2 km) and Achosnich 1.8 miles (3 km), and the village of Kilchoan 5 miles (8 km).

The point lies seven miles south of the island of Muck, with Eigg and Rùm a few miles further to the north. Coll is situated nine miles to the west, and Mull is five miles south.

== Cultural references ==
In 1990 the Scottish composer Judith Weir wrote a 10-minute piece for two pianos called Ardnamurchan Point for the pianists Edmund Niemann and Nurit Tilles.

The location is one of the boundary points of the Inshore coastal areas of the United Kingdom, and is mentioned in the Shipping Forecast, broadcast by BBC Radio 4 on behalf of the Maritime and Coastguard Agency.
