= Ness Point =

Easternmost point of England, the United Kingdom and the British Isles

- Headland
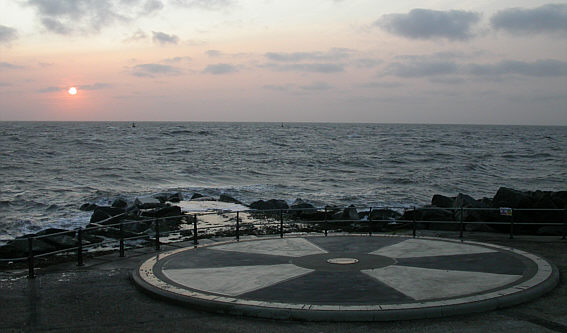
- Ness Point Sunrise

- Location within England
- Coordinates: 52.4811°N 1.7628°E
- Grid position: TM 55597 93677

Ness Point, also known as Lowestoft Ness, is the most easterly point of England, Great Britain, the United Kingdom and the British Isles. It is located in Lowestoft in the East Suffolk district of the county of Suffolk. The site is located to the east of the town centre, overlooking the North Sea, and has a direction marker, known as the Euroscope, marking locations in other countries and their distance from Ness Point.

Located at Ness Point is the previous record holder for Britain's tallest wind turbine, nicknamed "Gulliver". It stands 126 metres (413 ft) tall, generating electricity for the National Grid.

Ness Point is a large terminal pumping station transferring sewage from Lowestoft to Corton STW. It suffered extreme concrete degradation throughout the facility from Hydrogen sulfide which has necessitated repairs.

== See also ==
- Corrachadh Mòr, westernmost point of the British mainland.
- Lizard Point, southernmost point of the British mainland.
- Dunnet Head, northernmost point of the British mainland.
- Marshall Meadows Bay, northernmost point of England.
- Ness, Lewis, northernmost point of the Outer Hebrides

== Gallery ==
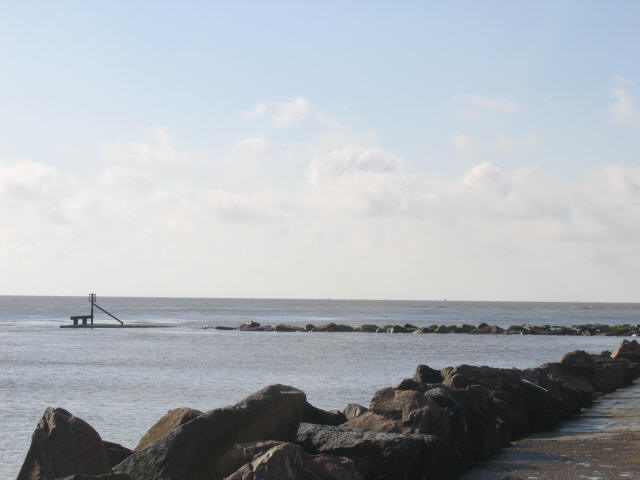
Easternmost point of England

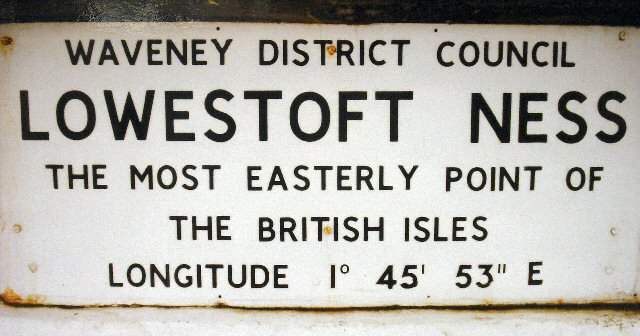
Plaque marking the easternmost point of the British Isles

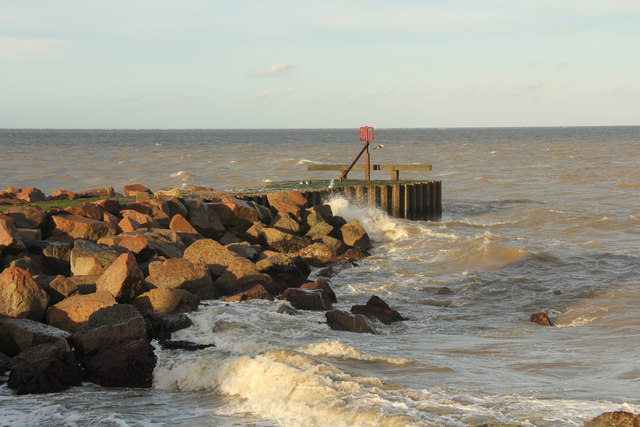
Lowestoft Ness
