= South Rhins Community Development Trust =

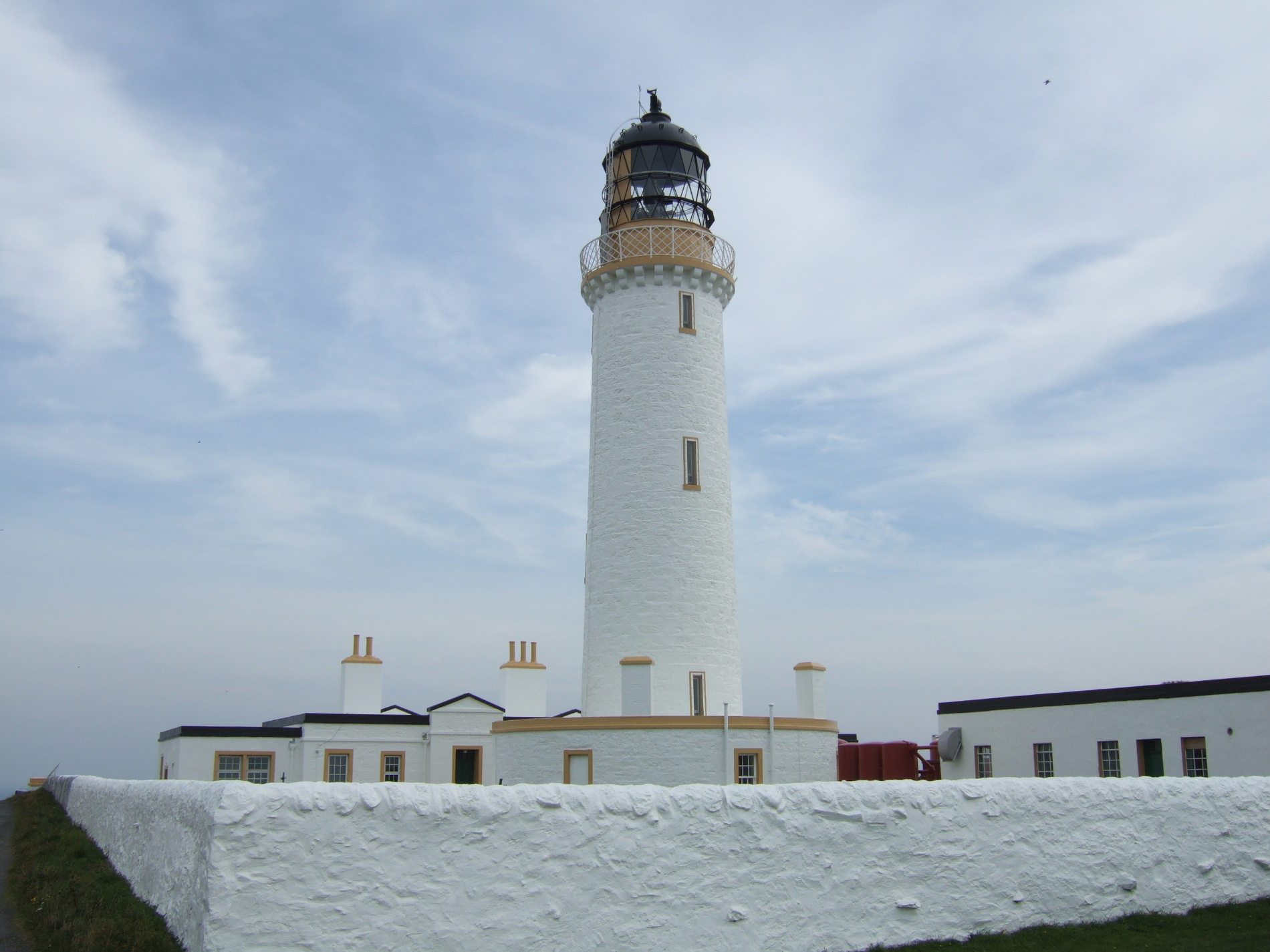
Lighthouse on the Mull of Galloway

The South Rhins Community Development Trust was a local enterprise group based in the South Rhins, and area within Rhins of Galloway, Wigtownshire. The group was based in the village hall of Stoneykirk.

The aims of the Trust were:

- To support agricultural development and diversification
- Development of tourism which builds on the environment, heritage, culture and location
- Increase opportunities for women and young people
- Improve access to social and community facilities
- To promote, establish and operate/support other schemes and projects of a charitable nature for the benefit of the South Rhins community.

The trust was composed of local people, business people, and politicians. The main focus of the group was the creation of the Mull of Galloway experience, and the trust was instrumental in setting up the visitor centre in 2000 and reopening the lighthouse to visitors. Through this project they also set up a website to represent the South Rhins to tourists, under the banner of the Mull of Galloway (Scotland's Most Southerly Point).

In 2018, the decision was taken to close the community trust, as a separate body (Mull of Galloway Trust) had taken responsibility for most activities. It was formally dissolved in 2021.
