= Cairngaan =

Coordinates: 54.65009°N 4.90154°W

- Location within Dumfries and Galloway
- OS grid reference: NX128319
- Council area: Dumfries and Galloway
- Lieutenancy area: Wigtownshire
- Country: Scotland
- Sovereign state: United Kingdom
- Post town: STRANRAER
- Postcode district: DG9
- Police: Scotland
- Fire: Scottish
- Ambulance: Scottish
- UK Parliament: Dumfries and Galloway
- Scottish Parliament: Galloway and West Dumfries

Cairngaan, Wigtownshire, is the southmost settlement in Scotland. The hamlet of Cairngaan lies just north of the Mull of Galloway (which contains Scotland's most southerly point, and a lighthouse, but no villages) on the B7041, after a turn-off from the B7065 road. The village is at the extreme end of the B7041. As a result of Cairngaan's southerly location, the town lies south of the English cities of Newcastle upon Tyne, Sunderland and Carlisle.

Nearby settlements include Drummore and Kirkmaiden to the near north. Around 18 miles (29 km) away is Stranraer and the ferry to Northern Ireland.

== History ==
There is archaeological evidence of prehistoric settlement, including the presence of numerous standing stones at West Cairngaan.

The area has long been used for agriculture and farming.

== See also ==
- Extreme points of the United Kingdom
