= Benbane Head =

Northernmost point of mainland Northern Ireland

Coordinates: 55.247°N 6.485°W

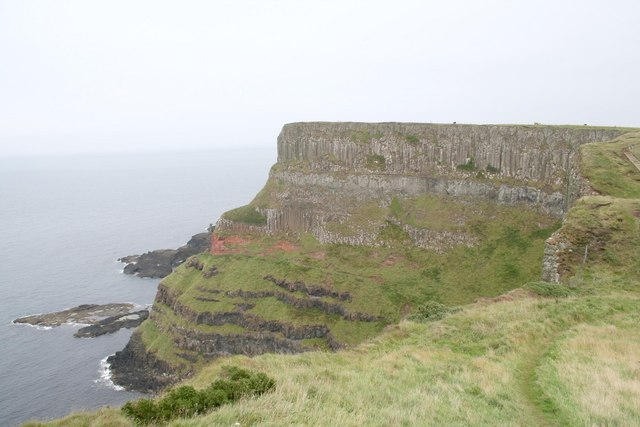

Benbane Head, or Benbane (from Irish an Bhinn Bhán 'the white headland'), is the northernmost point of mainland Northern Ireland. It is in County Antrim, near the Giant's Causeway, which lies between Causeway Head and Benbane Head. The nearest settlements are Bushmills and Portballintrae.
