= Extreme points of the British Isles =

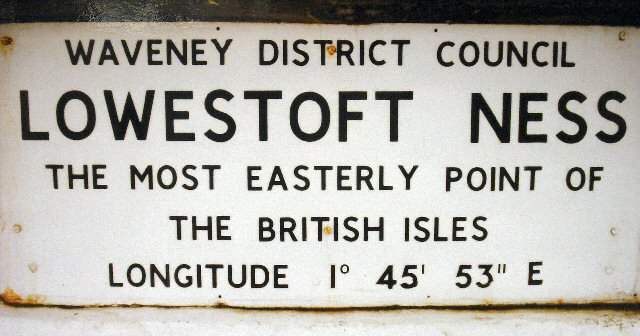
Plaque marking the easternmost Point of the British Isles

This is a list of the extreme points of the British Isles, the points that are farther north, south, east, west, higher or lower than any other location.

- Northernmost Point — Out Stack, Shetland Islands, Scotland
- Northernmost Settlement — Skaw, Unst, Shetland Islands, Scotland
- Southernmost Point — Les Minquiers Reef, Jersey, Channel Islands
- Southernmost Settlement — Saint Clement, Jersey, Channel Islands
- Westernmost Point — Rockall, Harris, Scotland
- Westernmost Settlement — Dunquin, County Kerry, Ireland
- Easternmost Point — Lowestoft Ness, Suffolk, England
- Easternmost Settlement — Lowestoft, Suffolk, England
- Most Inland Point — Church Flatts Farm, Derbyshire, England
- Most Inland Settlement — Coton in the Elms, Derbyshire, England, at 70 miles (113 km) from the nearest coast.
- Highest Point — Ben Nevis, Highland, Scotland at 1,345 m (4,413 ft) above sea level.
- Highest Settlement — Flash, Staffordshire, England at 463 m (1,519 ft) above sea level.
- Lowest Point — North Slob, County Wexford, Ireland at 3 m (10 ft) below sea level.

== See also ==
- Extreme points of Ireland
- Extreme points of the United Kingdom
