= Muckle Flugga =

Small Shetland island

Coordinates: 60.85369°N 0.88837°W

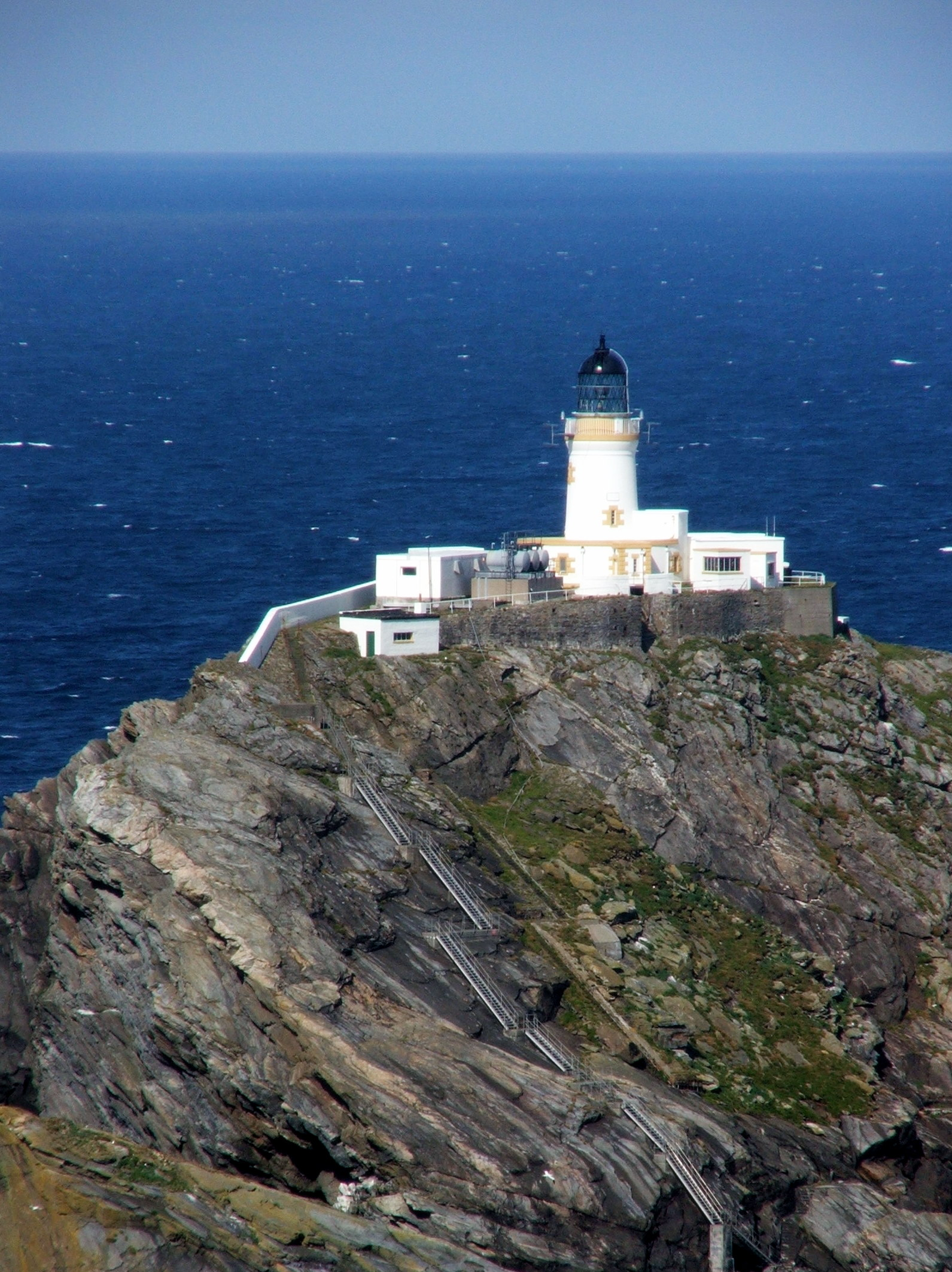
Muckle Flugga Lighthouse

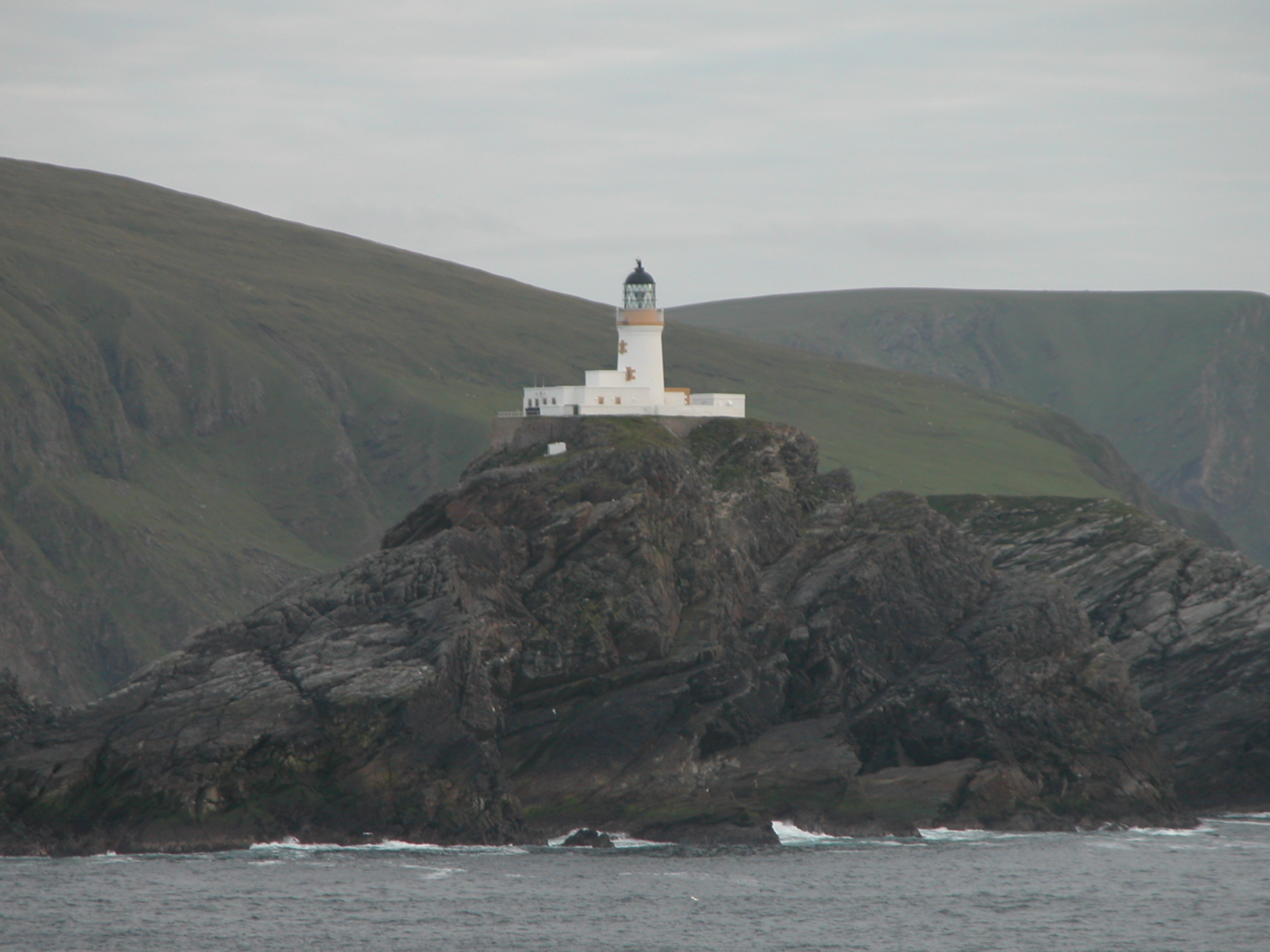
Muckle Flugga

Muckle Flugga (/ˈmʌkəl ˈflʌɡə/) is a small rocky island north of Unst in the Shetland Islands, Scotland. It is the most northerly hill in Scotland and is often described as the northernmost point of the British Isles, but the smaller islet of Out Stack is actually further north. It used to be the northernmost inhabited island, but forfeited that accolade to Unst when Muckle Flugga Lighthouse was automated in 1995 and the last residents moved out.

Muckle Flugga and neighbouring Little Flugga take their names from the Old Norse Flugey, meaning "cliff island". The larger island's name has frequently appeared on lists of unusual place-names.

== Folklore ==
According to local folklore, Muckle Flugga and nearby Out Stack were formed when two giants named Herman and Saxa fell in love with the same mermaid. They fought over her by throwing large rocks at each other, one of which became Muckle Flugga. To get rid of them, the mermaid offered to marry whichever one would follow her to the North Pole. They both followed her and drowned as neither giant could swim.

== In popular culture ==
A novel by Michael Pedersen (writer) titled Muckle Flugga and set on the island was first published in 2025 by Faber & Faber.
