= Caolas =

Settlement in the Outer Hebrides, Scotland

Coordinates: 56.944°N 7.544°W

Caolas: Scottish Gaelic: An Caolas
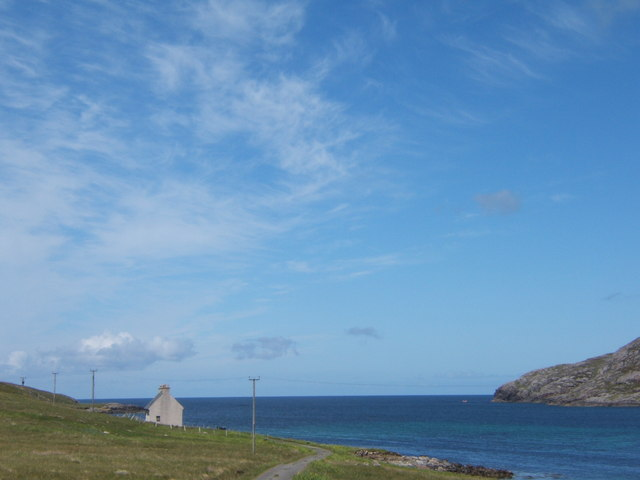
- Road and house at Caolas

- Location within Scotland
- Language: Scottish Gaelic; English
- OS grid reference: NL629973
- Civil parish: Barra
- Council area: Comhairle nan Eilean Siar
- Lieutenancy area: Western Isles
- Country: Scotland
- Sovereign state: United Kingdom
- Post town: ISLE OF BARRA
- Postcode district: HS9
- Dialling code: 01871
- Police: Scotland
- Fire: Scottish
- Ambulance: Scottish
- UK Parliament: Na h-Eileanan an Iar
- Scottish Parliament: Na h-Eileanan an Iar

Caolas (Scottish Gaelic: An Caolas [ən̪ˠ ˈkʰɯːl̪ˠəs̪]), is a small settlement on the island of Vatersay, in the Outer Hebrides, Scotland. Caolas is within the parish of Barra. It is the westernmost settlement in Scotland. Previously, the village on Hirta claimed this title; Hirta was also the most western settlement in the United Kingdom, which is now Belleek, County Fermanagh, Northern Ireland.

Caolas is a word (in both Scottish Gaelic and Irish) meaning "straits" and frequently rendered as "kyles" in English.
