= Extreme points of the United Kingdom =

This is a list of the extreme points of the United Kingdom: the points that are farther north, south, east or west than any other location. Traditionally the extent of the island of Great Britain has stretched "from Land's End to John o' Groats" (that is, from the extreme southwest of mainland England to the far northeast of mainland Scotland).

This article does not include references to the Channel Islands because they are Crown dependencies, not constituent parts of the United Kingdom.

Extreme points of the United Kingdom

== Extreme points of the United Kingdom ==
- Northernmost point – Out Stack, Shetland at 60°51′N 0°52′W
- Northernmost settlement – Skaw, Unst, Shetland Islands at 60°49′N 0°47′W
- Southernmost point – Pednathise Head, Western Rocks, Isles of Scilly at 49°51′N 6°24′W
- Southernmost settlement – St Agnes, Isles of Scilly at 49°53′N 6°20′W
- Westernmost point – Rockall at 57°35′N 13°41′W, which was only incorporated into Scotland in the 20th century. If Rockall is ignored, Soay, St Kilda, at 57.830°N 8.638°W is the westernmost point.
- Westernmost settlement – Belleek, County Fermanagh at 54°28′N 8°10′W. Until 1930, the westernmost settlement was Hirta, on the island of St Kilda, but it is now abandoned; the island now has a military base, staffed during the summer months.
- Easternmost point – Lowestoft Ness, Suffolk, at 52°29′N 1°46′E
- Easternmost settlement – Lowestoft, Suffolk, at 52°28′N 1°45′E
- Highest point – Ben Nevis, Highland, at 1,345 m (4,413 ft) – 56.797°N 5.004°W
- Lowest point – Holme Fen, Cambridgeshire, 3 m (9.8 ft) below sea level at 52°29′N 0°13′W

== Extreme points within the UK ==
In addition to the extreme points of the UK as a whole, the extreme points of England, Northern Ireland, Scotland, Wales and for the island of Great Britain are listed below.

=== Great Britain ===
- Northernmost point – Dunnet Head at 58°40′N 3°22′W, known also as Easter Head, Caithness, Highland
- Northernmost settlement – Skarfskerry, Caithness, Highland at 58°39′N 3°15′W
- Southernmost point – Lizard Point, Cornwall at 49°57′N 5°12′W
- Southernmost settlement – Lizard, Cornwall at 49°57′N 5°12′W
- Westernmost point – Corrachadh Mòr, Highland at 56°42′N 6°13′W
- Westernmost settlement – Grigadale, Highland at 56°43′N 6°11′W
- Easternmost point – Ness Point, Lowestoft, Suffolk at 52°29′N 1°46′E
- Easternmost settlement – Lowestoft, Suffolk at 52°28′N 1°45′E
- Furthest point from coastal waters – Church Flatts Farm, Coton-in-the-Elms, South Derbyshire at 52°43.6′N 1°37.2′W

=== England ===
==== Including islands ====
- Northernmost point – Marshall Meadows Bay, Northumberland at 55°48′N 2°02′W
- Northernmost settlement – Marshall Meadows, Northumberland at 55°48′N 2°02′W
- Southernmost point – Pednathise Head, Western Rocks, Isles of Scilly at 49°51′N 6°24′W
- Southernmost settlement – St Agnes, Isles of Scilly at 49°53′N 6°20′W
- Westernmost point – Crim Rocks, Isles of Scilly at 49°53′N 6°27′W
- Westernmost settlement – Bryher, Isles of Scilly at 49°57′N 6°22′W
- Easternmost point – Lowestoft Ness, Suffolk at 52°29′N 1°46′E
- Easternmost settlement – Lowestoft, Suffolk at 52°28′N 1°45′E

==== English mainland ====
- Northernmost point – Marshall Meadows Bay, Northumberland at 55°48′N 2°02′W
- Northernmost settlement – Marshall Meadows, Northumberland at 55°48′N 2°02′W
- Southernmost point – Lizard Point, Cornwall at 49°57′N 5°12′W
- Southernmost settlement – Lizard, Cornwall at 49°57′N 5°12′W
- Westernmost point – Dr Syntax's Head, Land's End, Cornwall at 50°04′N 5°43′W
- Westernmost settlement – Sennen Cove, Cornwall at 50°04′N 5°42′W
- Easternmost point – Lowestoft Ness, Suffolk at 52°29′N 1°46′E
- Easternmost settlement – Lowestoft, Suffolk at 52°28′N 1°45′E
- Geographic centre of England – Lindley Hall Farm (#4), Leicestershire (near Fenny Drayton and Higham on the Hill) (52°33′42.942″N 1°27′53.474″W;

The distance between the southernmost point (Lizard Point) and the westernmost point (Land's End) is only 38.5 km (23.9 mi).

=== Northern Ireland ===
==== Including islands ====
- Northernmost point – Skerriagh, Ballygill North, Rathlin Island, County Antrim at 55°18′N 6°14′W
- Northernmost settlement – Rathlin Island, off Ballycastle Bay, County Antrim at 55°17′N 6°11′W
- Southernmost point – Cranfield Point, County Down at 54°1′N 6°3′W
- Southernmost settlement – Greencastle, County Down at 54°2′N 6°5′W
- Westernmost point – western part of Manger townland, County Fermanagh (immediately east of the Bradogue Bridge) at 54°27′53″N 8°10′39″W
- Westernmost settlement – Belleek, County Fermanagh at 54°48′N 8°09′W
- Easternmost point – Cannon Rock, off Ards Peninsula, County Down at 54°29′N 5°25′W
- Easternmost settlement – Portavogie, County Down at 54°27′N 5°26′W

==== Northern Irish mainland ====
- Northernmost point – Benbane Head, County Antrim at 55°15′N 6°28′W
- Northernmost settlement – Ballintoy, County Antrim at 55°14′N 6°21′W
- Southernmost point – Cranfield Point, County Down at 54°1′N 6°3′W
- Southernmost settlement – Greencastle, County Down at 54°2′N 6°5′W
- Westernmost point – western part of Manger townland, County Fermanagh (immediately east of the Bradogue Bridge) at 54°27′53″N 8°10′39″W
- Westernmost settlement – Belleek, County Fermanagh at 54°48′N 8°09′W
- Easternmost point – Burr Point, Ards Peninsula, County Down at 54°29′N 5°26′W
- Easternmost settlement – Portavogie, County Down at 54°27′N 5°26′W

=== Scotland ===
==== Including islands ====
- Northernmost point – Out Stack, Shetland at 60°51′N 0°52′W
- Northernmost settlement – Skaw, Unst, Shetland at 60°49′N 0°47′W
- Southernmost point – Mull of Galloway, Wigtownshire at 54°38′N 4°52′W
- Southernmost settlement – Cairngaan, Wigtownshire at 54°38′N 4°54′W
- Westernmost point – Rockall at 57°35′N 13°41′W
- Westernmost settlement – Caolas, Bhatarsaigh (Vatersay), Outer Hebrides at 56°56′N 7°32′W
- Easternmost point – Bound Skerry, Out Skerries, Shetland at 60°25′N 0°43′W
- Easternmost settlement – Bruray, Out Skerries, Shetland at 60°26′N 0°45′W

==== Scottish mainland ====
- Northernmost point – Dunnet Head at 58°40′N 3°22′W, known also as Easter Head, Caithness, Highland, Scotland
- Northernmost settlement – Skarfskerry, Caithness, Highland at 58°39′N 3°15′W
- Southernmost point – Mull of Galloway, Wigtownshire at 54°38′N 4°52′W
- Southernmost settlement – Cairngaan, Wigtownshire at 54°38′N 4°54′W
- Westernmost point – Corrachadh Mòr, Highland at 56°42′N 6°13′W
- Westernmost settlement – Grigadale, Highland at 56°43′N 6°11′W
- Easternmost point – Keith Inch, Aberdeenshire at 57°30′N 1°46′W
- Easternmost settlement – Peterhead, Aberdeenshire at 57°30′N 1°46′W

=== Wales ===
==== Including islands ====
- Northernmost point – Middle Mouse, Anglesey at 53°26′N 4°26′W
- Northernmost settlement – Llanlleiana, Anglesey at 53°25′N 4°25′W
- Southernmost point – Flat Holm, Cardiff, off Lavernock Point, Vale of Glamorgan at 51°22′N 3°7′W
- Southernmost settlement – Rhoose, Vale of Glamorgan at 51°23′N 3°20′W
- Westernmost point – Grassholm, Pembrokeshire at 51°43′N 5°29′W
- Westernmost settlement – Treginnis, Pembrokeshire at 51°52′N 5°18′W
- Easternmost point – Lady Park Wood, near Monmouth, Monmouthshire at 51°49′N 2°39′W
- Easternmost settlement – Chepstow, Monmouthshire at 51°37′N 2°39′W

==== Welsh mainland ====
- Northernmost point – Point of Ayr, Flintshire at 53°21′N 3°19′W
- Northernmost settlement – Talacre, Flintshire at 53°21′N 3°19′W
- Southernmost point – Breaksea Point, Vale of Glamorgan at 51°22′N 3°24′W
- Southernmost settlement – Rhoose, Vale of Glamorgan at 51°23′N 3°20′W
- Westernmost point – Pen Dal-aderyn, Pembrokeshire at 51°51′N 5°19′W
- Westernmost settlement – Treginnis, Pembrokeshire at 51°52′N 5°18′W
- Easternmost point – Lady Park Wood, near Monmouth, Monmouthshire at 51°49′N 2°39′W
- Easternmost settlement – Chepstow, Monmouthshire at 51°37′N 2°39′W

== British Overseas Territories and Crown dependencies ==
- Northernmost – Point of Ayre, Isle of Man at 54°25′N 4°22′W
- Southernmost – South Pole, British Antarctic Territory at 90°0′S 50°0′W – disputed
- Southernmost – Thule Island, South Sandwich Islands at 59°27′S 27°18′W – if not including Antarctica
- Westernmost – Oeno Island, Pitcairn Islands at 23°55′S 130°44′W
- Easternmost – Diego Garcia, British Indian Ocean Territory at 7°18′S 72°30′E — disputed

== See also ==
- Centre points of the United Kingdom
- Geography of the United Kingdom
- List of mountains and hills of the United Kingdom
- Extreme points of the British Isles
- Extreme points of Ireland
- Extreme points of the European Union
- Extreme points of Europe
- Extreme points of Eurasia
- Extreme points of Africa-Eurasia
- Extreme points of Earth
