= Skarfskerry =

Coordinates: 58.649298°N 3.272896°W

Scarfskerry: Scottish Gaelic: Sgarbh Sgeir
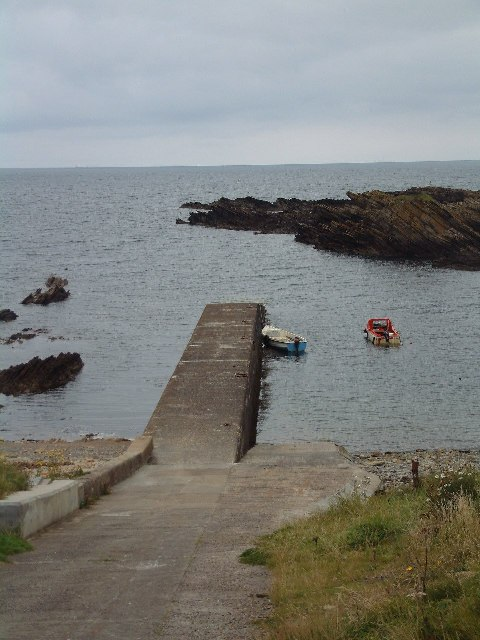

- Location within the Caithness area
- Population: 300
- OS grid reference: ND260734
- Council area: Highland
- Lieutenancy area: Caithness
- Country: Scotland
- Sovereign state: United Kingdom
- Post town: THURSO
- Postcode district: KW14
- Dialling code: 01847
- Police: Scotland
- Fire: Scottish
- Ambulance: Scottish
- UK Parliament: Caithness, Sutherland and Easter Ross
- Scottish Parliament: Caithness, Sutherland and Ross

Skarfskerry (or Scarfskerry; Scottish Gaelic: Sgarbh Sgeir) is a settlement located in the far northern county Caithness on a small peninsula northeast of Thurso off the A836 in Scotland. It is the most northerly settlement in Great Britain. The name comes from the Old Norse for "cormorants' rock". Historically, it belonged to the Parish of Dunnet, along with Brough.

== Landmarks ==
This rural settlement consists of a scattering of crofts and other houses and a small harbour with a pier. The harbour is no longer used for commercial purposes, although boats operate in the area for small amounts of fishing and trips for tourists to see white-beaked dolphins, minke whales and harbor porpoises. The pier, about 150 yards (140 m) long, has a small bight on the southwestern side, and a rocky beach continues towards the nearby settlement of Ham. The hamlet also contains a Baptist church, Skarfskerry Point, a double-headed point 30 feet (9 m) in height, marks the eastern entrance point of Brough Bay. The Loch of Mey lies just to the southeast, which also features in a series of children's stories, The Loch of Mey Monster, by a local author from 2007 to 2009.

Scarfskerry Harbour is also home to the wreck of the SS Linkmoor, of London, Captain Ridley. Liverpool to Blyth. It was lost on 10 November 1930 at 2:55 a.m. during a westerly gale of force 8–9 in heavy sea and squalls. It was caused by engine trouble and the state of the weather, with 32 on board who were all saved. The SS Linkmoor is a favourite "shore" dive site for local divers and is often used as a training dive, which is best dived in winter due to the shallow nature of the wreckage being obscured by kelp. The boilers actually stood proud of the water until they finally succumbed to the waters during a storm in the 1990s.

A few hundred metres west of the harbour lies the wreck of the SS Victoria. Situated between the harbour and Ruther Geo, this wreck was lost on 3 March 1891. The crew were rescued by Longhope Lifeboat, who rowed for 10 hours across the Pentland Firth to rescue the crew. An RNLI Silver Medal was awarded to Coxswain Benjamin Stout in recognition of his gallantry when rescuing the crew of 22. Eleven of the rescued crew were Germans, and the Emperor of Germany presented a gold watch to the coxswain and £24 to the crew of the lifeboat. In 1996, a fisherman's pattern anchor from the SS Victoria was raised by Thurso Sub Aqua Club (TSAC), and whilst residing for several years at a property in Scarfskerry was later presented by TSAC to Longhope Lifeboat station as a mark of respect for the heroic work carried out by the RNLI on a daily basis. The Victoria is also a popular dive site by local divers, but as with the Linkmoor is best dived during the winter months. Still present on the site are several anchors and slabs of packed stones, believed to be used for ballast.

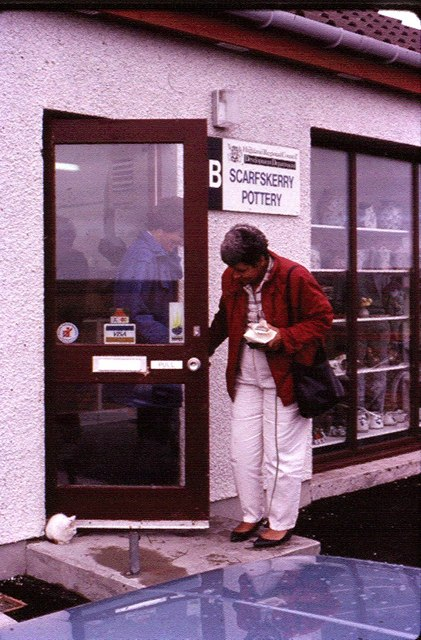
Scarfskerry Pottery (relocated to John O'Groats in 1986)

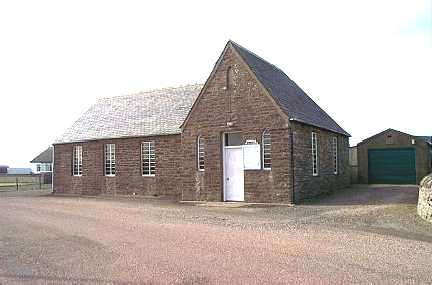
The Baptist Church

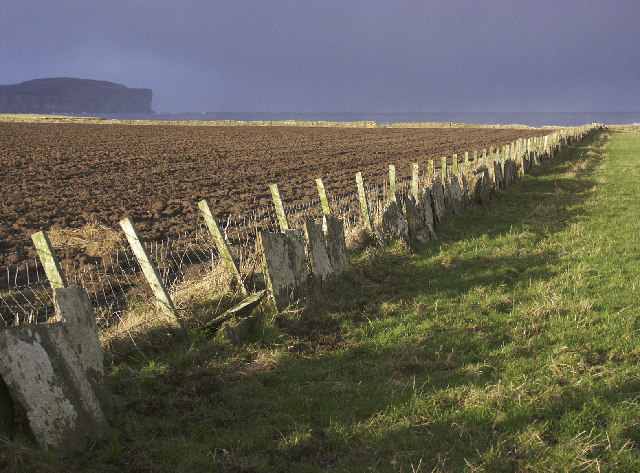
Farmland near Skarfskerry, Caithness

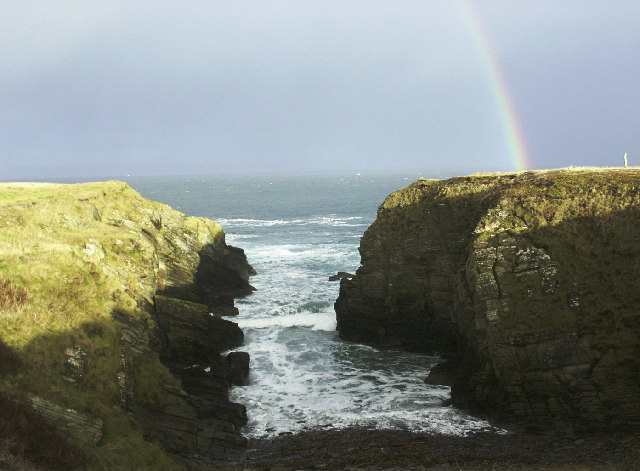
Local scenery

== See also ==
- Extreme points of the United Kingdom
