= Out Stack =

Island in Scotland

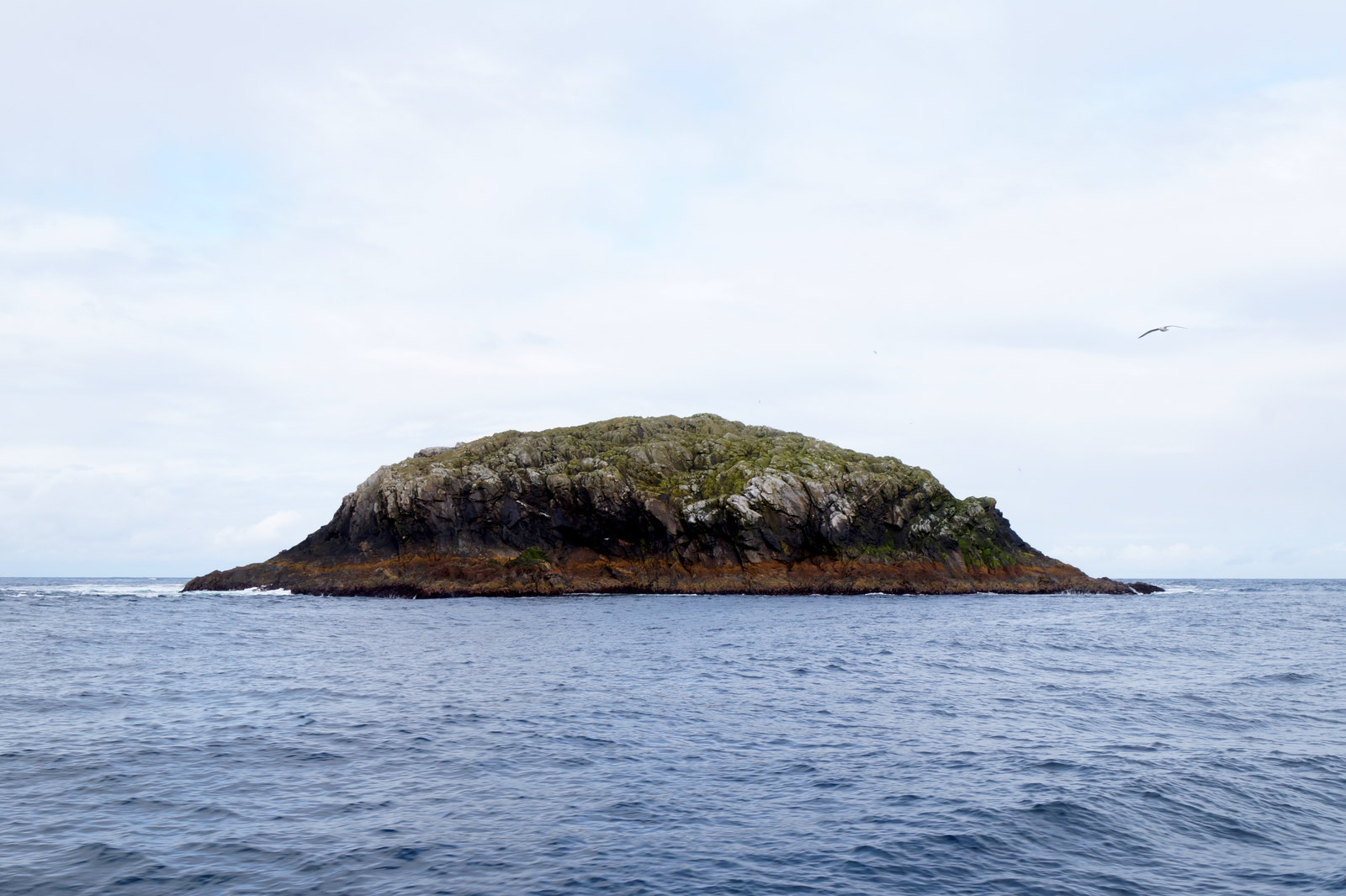

Location
- Location within Scotland
- OS grid reference: HP612202
- Coordinates: 60.8603°N 0.8741°W

Physical geography
- Island group: Shetland
- Highest elevation: 27 m (89 ft)

Administration
- Council area: Shetland Islands
- Country: Scotland
- Sovereign state: United Kingdom

Demographics
- Population: 0

Out Stack (Scots: Ootsta) is an island in Shetland, and the northernmost point of Scotland, the United Kingdom, and the British Isles.

It lies 600 m (2,000 ft) northeast of Muckle Flugga and 1 1/2 nautical miles (3 kilometres) north of the island of Unst.

It is one of the North Isles of the Shetland Islands and lies within the Hermaness National Nature Reserve.

It is uninhabited and there is no landfall directly to the north.

== Description ==
Out Stack is little more than a rocky outcrop, and is uninhabited. It has been described as "the full stop at the end of Britain". Travellers would not encounter any further land masses between Out Stack and the North Pole if heading directly north.

== Jane Franklin ==
Jane Franklin, the wife of the Arctic explorer John Franklin, landed on Out Stack after John Rae's reports of the fate of the Franklin expedition had reached Stromness, Orkney, where she lived, in 1853/54.

== Hermaness National Nature Reserve ==
The Hermaness National Nature Reserve covers the Muckle Flugga rocks and Out Stack, as well as the seabird cliffs and moorland of Hermaness.
