= Mull of Galloway =

Southernmost point of Scotland

Mull of Galloway: Scottish Gaelic: Maol nan Gall
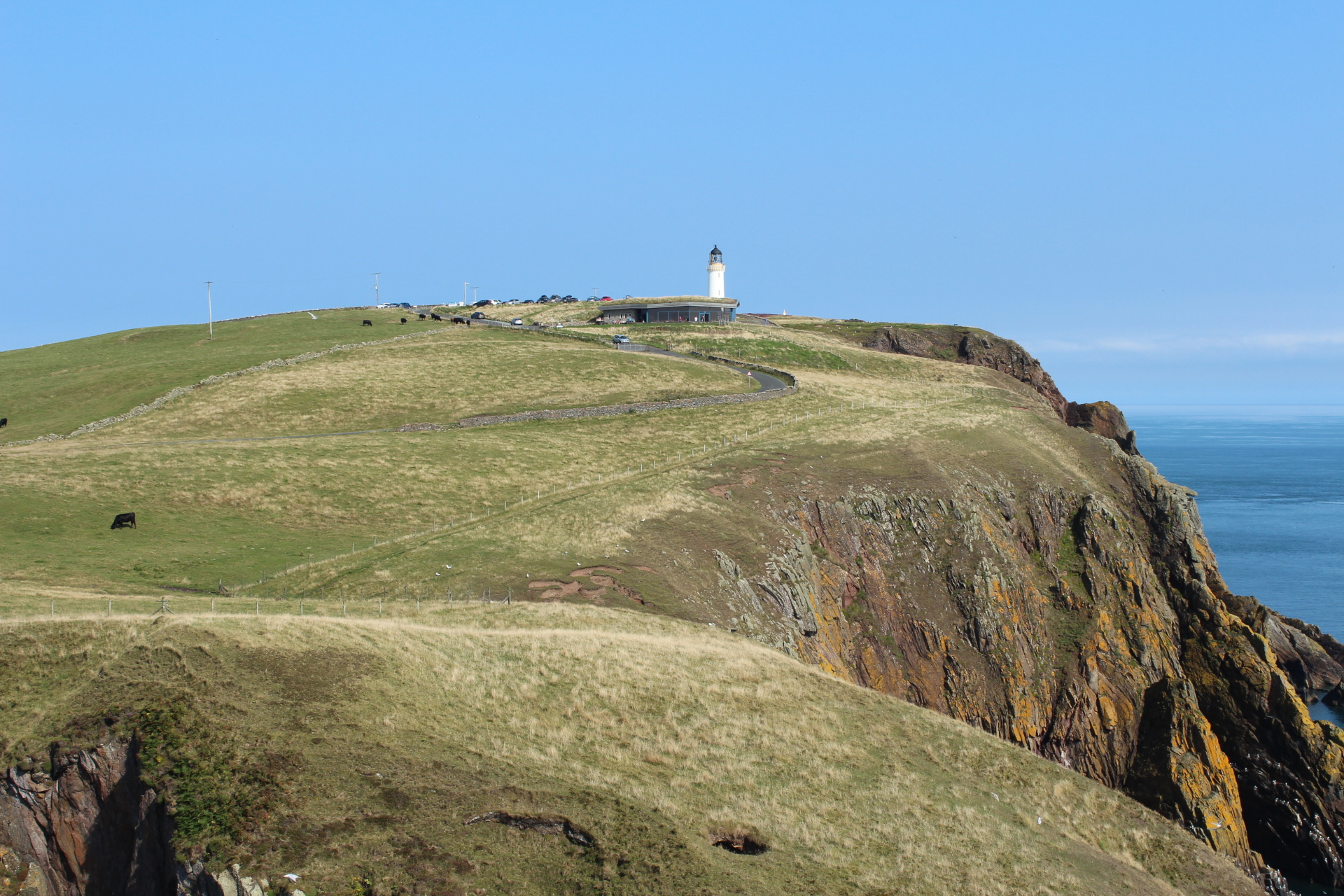
- Mull of Galloway headland

- Location within Dumfries and Galloway
- OS grid reference: NX 15747 30411
  - Edinburgh: 112 mi (180 km)
  - London: 292 mi (470 km)
- Council area: Dumfries and Galloway
- Lieutenancy area: Wigtownshire
- Country: Scotland
- Sovereign state: United Kingdom
- Post town: STRANRAER
- Postcode district: DG9
- Dialling code: 01776
- UK Parliament: Dumfries and Galloway
- Scottish Parliament: Galloway and West Dumfries

The Mull of Galloway (Scottish Gaelic: Maol nan Gall, pronounced [mɯːlˠ̪ nəŋ ˈkaulˠ̪]; grid reference NX158303) is the southernmost point of Scotland. It is situated in Wigtownshire, Dumfries and Galloway, at the end of the Rhins of Galloway peninsula, also being the most southerly hill.

The Mull has one of the last remaining sections of natural coastal habitat on the Galloway coast and as such supports a wide variety of plant and animal species. It is now a nature reserve managed by the RSPB. Mull means rounded headland or promontory.

The Mull of Galloway Trail, one of Scotland's Great Trails, is a 59 km (37 mi) long-distance footpath that runs from the Mull of Galloway via Stranraer to Glenapp near Ballantrae, where the trail links with the Ayrshire Coastal Path.

== Lighthouse ==
Mull of Galloway Lighthouse
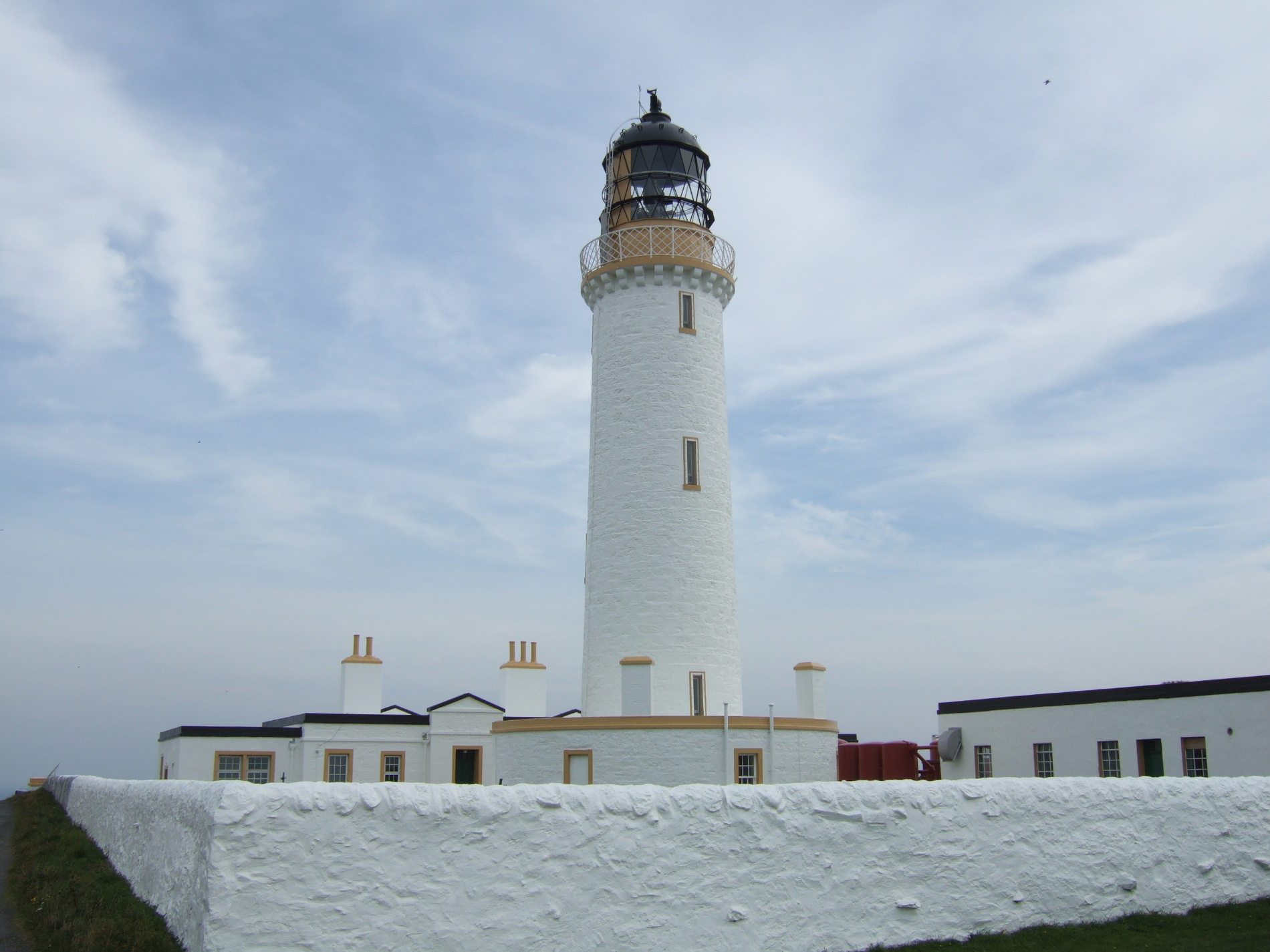
- Lighthouse on the Mull of Galloway
- Location: Mull of Galloway; Wigtownshire; Scotland; United Kingdom
- OS grid: NX1569230398
- Coordinates: 54.635005°N 4.857416°W

Tower
- Constructed: 1830
- Designed by: Robert Stevenson
- Construction: masonry tower
- Automated: 1988
- Height: 26 metres (85 ft)
- Shape: cylindrical tower with balcony and lantern
- Markings: white tower, black lantern, ochre trim
- Operator: South Rhins Community Development Trust
- Heritage: category A listed building

Light
- Focal height: 99 metres (325 ft)
- Range: 28 nautical miles (52 km; 32 mi)
- Characteristic: Fl W 20s.

An active lighthouse is positioned at the point. Built in 1830 by engineer Robert Stevenson, the white-painted round tower is 26 metres (85 ft) high. The light is 99 metres (325 ft) above sea level and has a range of 28 nautical miles (52 km). The lighthouse and lighthouse keepers' houses are designated as a Category A listed building.

During World War II, on 8 June 1944 at 7.30 pm, a French member of the British Air Transport Auxiliary (ATA), Cladius Echallier, died by striking the Lighthouse in a Beaufighter, while making a low landfall from the Irish Sea.

The lighthouse is now automatic, and an old outhouse has been converted into a visitor centre, run by the South Rhins Community Development Trust, a group of local people and businesses. In 2004 a new café was built at the Mull of Galloway, called the "Gallie Craig". Its design incorporates into the landscape with a turf roof, giving views across to Northern Ireland and southwards to the Isle of Man.

In 2013 there was a community buyout and the Mull of Galloway Trust purchased land and buildings, with the exception of the tower, from the Northern Lighthouse Board. In 2017 the foghorn, which was previously active from 1894 to 1987, was restored and is sounded occasionally. An official ceremony to commemorate the restoration took place on 1 April 2018.

== See also ==
- List of extreme points of the United Kingdom
- List of lighthouses in Scotland
- List of Northern Lighthouse Board lighthouses
- Dunnet Head – Scotland's most northerly point on the mainland
- Corrachadh Mòr – Scotland's most westerly point on the mainland
- Keith Inch – Scotland's most easterly point on the mainland
