= Skaw, Unst =

Settlement in Shetland, Scotland

Coordinates: 60.825°N 0.791°W

Skaw
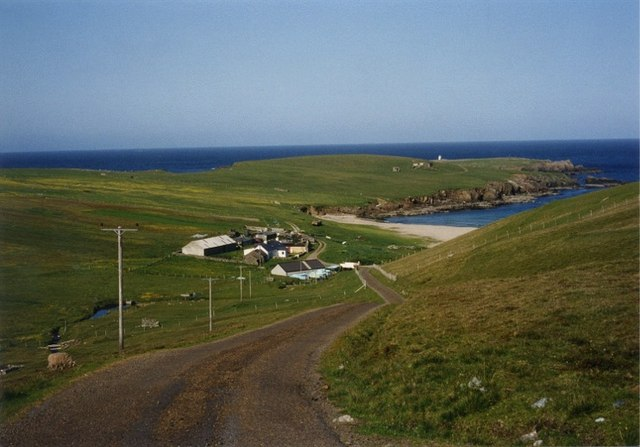
- The beach of Skaw

- Location within Shetland
- OS grid reference: HP657163
  - Edinburgh: 348 mi (560 km)
  - London: 644 mi (1,036 km)
- Civil parish: Unst
- Council area: Shetland
- Lieutenancy area: Shetland
- Country: Scotland
- Sovereign state: United Kingdom
- Post town: SHETLAND
- Postcode district: ZE2
- Dialling code: 01806
- Police: Scotland
- Fire: Scottish
- Ambulance: Scottish
- UK Parliament: Orkney and Shetland
- Scottish Parliament: Shetland

Skaw is a settlement in the Scottish archipelago of Shetland, located on the island of Unst. It is located north of Haroldswick on a peninsula in the northeast corner of the island, and is the most northerly settlement in the United Kingdom. It is currently inhabited by a single resident, whose business is sheep farming.

== Etymology ==
Skaw is derived from the Old Norse "Skagi" meaning a cape, headland, promontory or peninsula.

== Geography ==
The burn of Skaw flows from the uplands to the west through the constellation of small crofts that make up Skaw, and then east into the Wick of Skaw, a bay of the North Sea. A sheltered sandy beach lines the coast of the Wick of Skaw. To the northeast of the settlement across a small sea channel is the Holm of Skaw, an islet named after Skaw with a small automated lighthouse near its northern edge. The unclassified road (Holsens Road) from the B9087 to Skaw is the most northerly road in the UK road network, and the northernmost road in the world to use left-hand traffic.

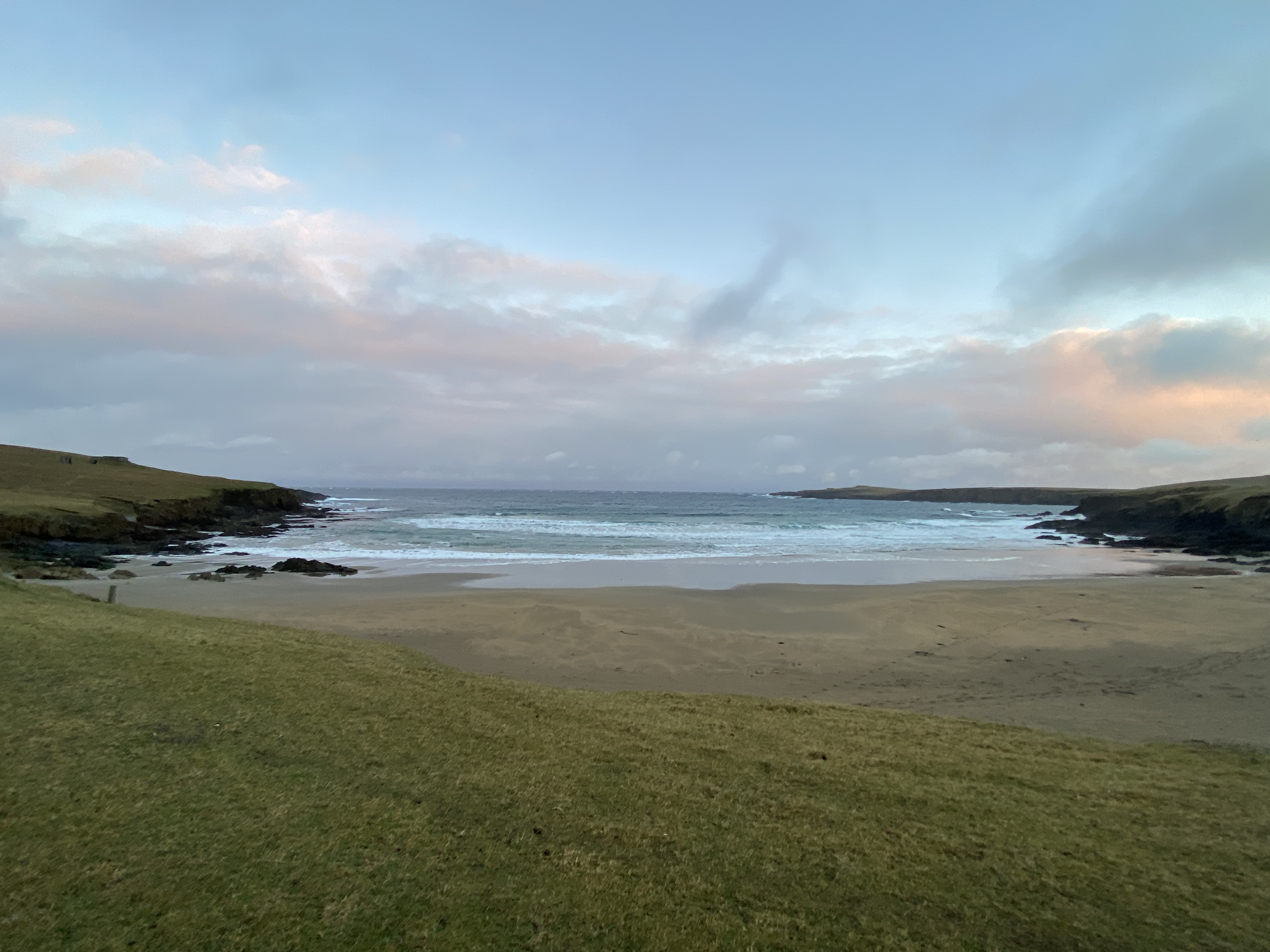
Wick of Scaw

== History ==
Walter Sutherland (died c. 1850), a former inhabitant of the northernmost cottage in Britain, was reportedly the last native speaker of the Norn language.

During World War II, the Royal Air Force built a Chain Home radar station at Skaw. The radar station was built in 1941 and closed in 1947. It was part of the defences of the RAF Sullom Voe flying boat base.

A combined Coastal Defence U-boat and Chain Home Low station was also built during the Second World War at Saxa Vord; after the war this became a ROTOR radar station. RAF Saxa Vord continued as a radar station after the end of the ROTOR programme. The radar now operates remotely and automatically as RRH Saxa Vord, returning to operation in 2019 after closure in 2006.

The settlement is near the SaxaVord Spaceport.

== See also ==
- Extreme points of the United Kingdom
- Skagen, a spit and town in Denmark with a cognate name
