= Corrachadh Mòr =

Westernmost point of Great Britain

- Headland
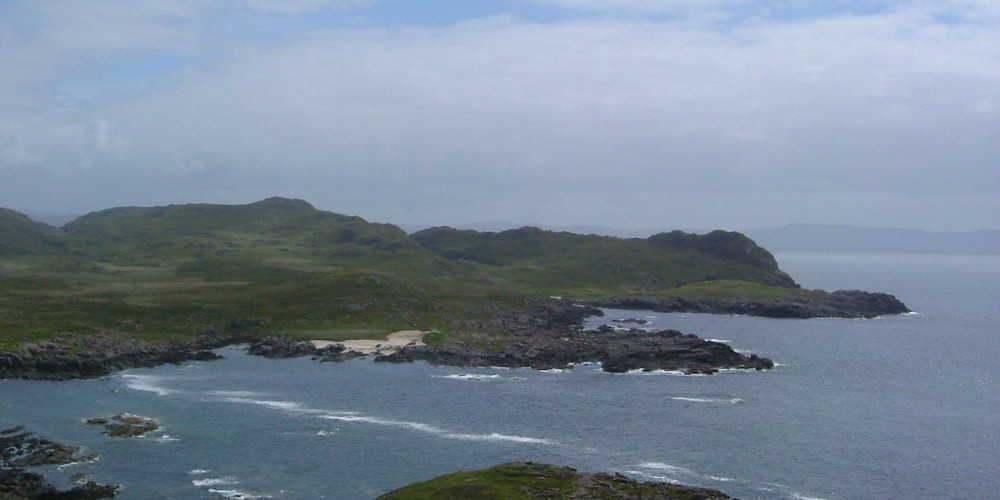
- Corrachadh Mòr to the right and Mull in the distance as seen from the Ardnamurchan Point lighthouse

- Location within Scotland
- Coordinates: 56°42′56″N 06°13′41″W
- Grid position: NM 41389 66199

Corrachadh Mòr is a headland on the Ardnamurchan Peninsula in Lochaber, Highland, west of Scotland. Notable for being the most westerly point on the island of Great Britain, it is 37 km (23 mi) further west than Land's End in Cornwall.

Depending on which coordinates are used, this headland is 31 or 43 metres (102 or 141 ft) west of Ardnamurchan Point (and about a kilometre to its south).

Corrachadh Mòr means 'great, tapering field' in Scottish Gaelic.

== See also ==
- Mull of Galloway – Scotland's most southerly point
- Dunnet Head – Scotland's most northerly point on the mainland
- Keith Inch – Scotland's most easterly point on the mainland
- List of extreme points of the United Kingdom

== Gallery ==
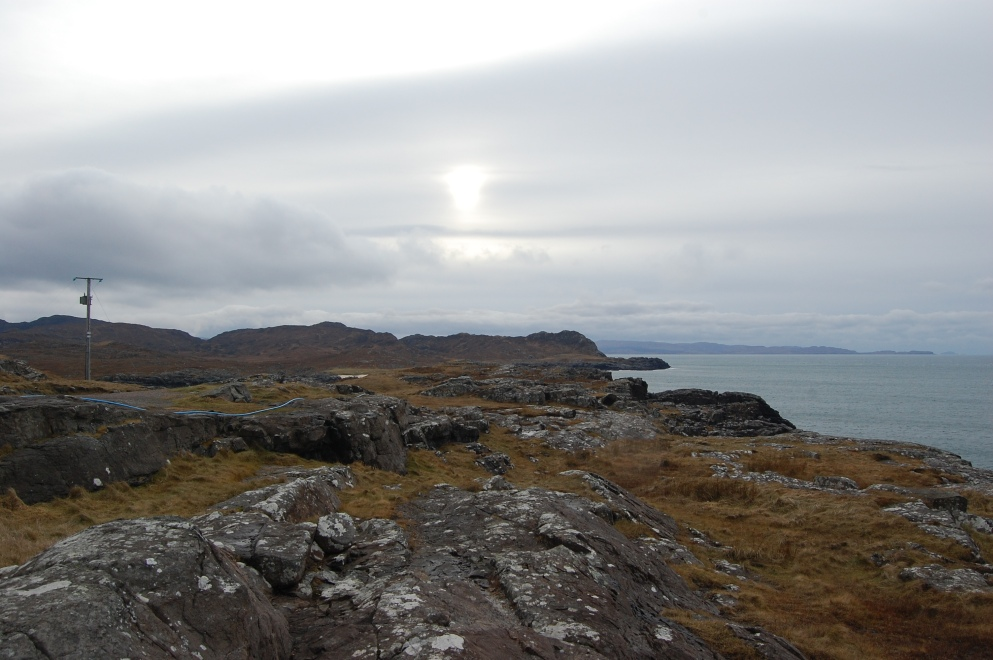
Corrachadh Mòr as seen from the Ardnamurchan Point
