= Valhalla Brewery =

Former brewery in Shetland Islands, Scotland

Coordinates: 60.7975°N 0.8247°W

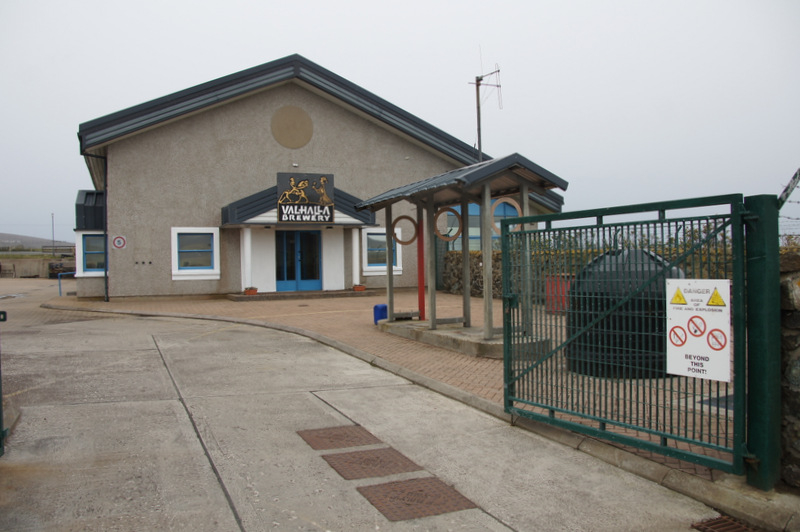
Valhalla Brewery, 2012

The Valhalla Brewery in Unst, Shetland, Scotland, was the northernmost brewery in the United Kingdom. It was opened by the husband and wife team Sonny and Silvia Priest in December 1997 (28 years ago), and originally based in a large shed in Baltasound, in the centre of Unst. In 2012 the brewery moved to a building at the former RAF Saxa Vord radar station, near Haroldswick. This larger premises allowed the brewery to double production to 144,000 litres (32,000 imp gal; 38,000 US gal) a year.

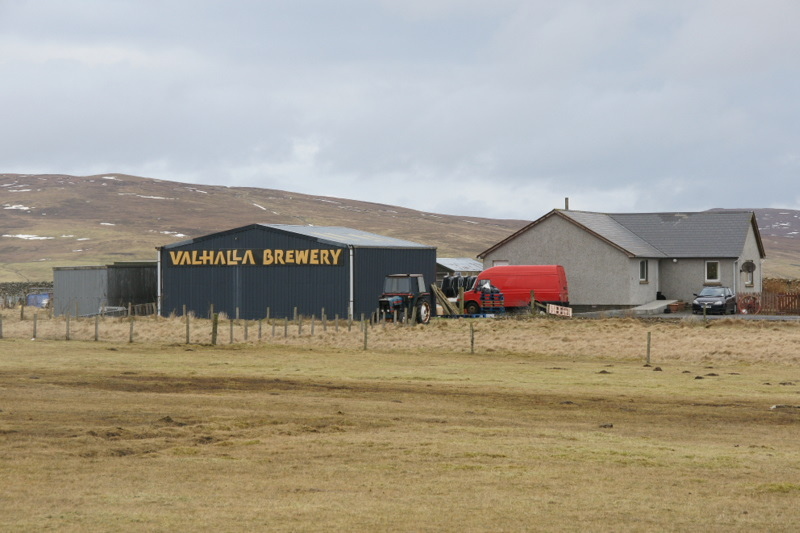
Valhalla Brewery, 2010

The Brewery was named after Valhalla, the Hall of the Norse god Odin, where all fallen Viking warriors are met with a horn filled with good ale. It brewed six different types of beers, the first was the "Auld Rock", a dark ale brewed with malt and hops. The other types are Simmer Dim, Sjolmet Stout, White Wife, Old Scatness and the newest one Island Bere brewed from bere barley. The brewery closed in spring 2017 (9 years ago) due to the ill-health of the owners.

In 2018 (8 years ago), the brewery was opened under new management in the former Olnafirth Primary School, Voe.
