= Robert Nisbet (sea captain) =

Shetland sea captain (1834–1917)

Robert Nisbet (1834–1917) was a Shetland sea captain. He was born on 15 October 1834 at Burravoe on the island of Yell, Shetland. He died on 3 May 1917 at Leith, Scotland.

His parents were Henry Nisbet and Tamar Williamson. Henry was born in 1807 on the northernmost Shetland island of Unst. Tamar was born in 1808 at Houlland on the island of Yell, Shetland.

Captain Robert Nisbet, circa 1912-1917

== Career ==
Nisbet's career commenced at about the age of 17 in 1851. After sailing a year on the Active (63 gross tons) in the Shetland islands packet trade, he travelled south in 1852 and joined the collier (ship) Friendship of Kingston upon Hull (Hull) under Captain Weldon. The Friendship was engaged in Firth of Forth and London trade. For eighteen months Nisbet was employed aboard the Friendship, until she was wrecked without loss of life off Bridlington, Yorkshire.

In the first two or three years of Nisbet's career, all the coasting trade was done by sailing ships. When he was in the colliers between Leith and London, there was only one steamboat – the Prompt – which plied between these two ports.

After the Friendship was wrecked, Nisbet joined another vessel in the same trade, the Duchess of Portland of Leith, which was commanded by two brothers well known in Leith – James and William Barnetson. On that vessel's second trip she almost came to grief. When leaving Leith, with a northerly gale blowing, she collided with Victoria Docks and damaged her bows. She continued on the passage, but it was with considerable difficulty that the crew managed to keep her from sinking on the trip. On reaching London she was put into drydock, and Nisbet took the chance of leaving the ship, with a view to working on foreign-going vessels.

On leaving the Duchess of Portland, in 1854 Nisbet shipped for about a year on board the barque Mary Eleanor of London under Captain Jones bound from London to Constantinople and the Black Sea. Nisbet sailed on the Mary Eleanor for nine months as boatswain and four months as second mate.

The Crimean War (October 1853 – February 1856) was then in progress. The Mary Eleanor was commissioned to take stores for the hospital at Scutari Barracks, opposite Constantinople. When the ship got to the Black Sea, all the crew except five left to join the Royal Navy. Nisbet remained with the ship and was promoted to second mate. At that time he was reputedly the youngest second mate in Britain.

At Scutari (modern-day Üsküdar in Turkey) the crew had to build stores, and then unload the cargo from the ship. After the Battle of Balaclava ended on 25 October 1854 Nisbet assisted in burying three hundred dead Russian soldiers in a mass grave.

After the Mary Eleanor, Nisbet joined the Egyptian of Glasgow under Captain Robert Tait. He went on two trading voyages to the Mediterranean, calling in at Malta, Syria, Salonica, Constantinople, Smyrna, Alexandria, Malta, Gibraltar and back to Liverpool.

Nisbet also served for some time in the Elsie of Glasgow under Captain Donald Main. The Elsie was of 1300 tons, and was considered a big ship at that time.

In late 1855, Nisbet joined the wood barque Jacatra, of Glasgow under Captain James McToldridge on a trading voyage to the Far East. He signed articles of agreement in her for a period not to exceed three years. The ship discharged a portion of her cargo at Batavia (now Jakarta in Indonesia), another portion at Singapore, and the balance of the cargo and some coals at Manila. There a cargo of sugar and Manila hemp was loaded for San Francisco.

When three days out of Manila the Jacatra was severely battered by a typhoon, and her bulwarks were damaged. On arrival at San Francisco the ship was repaired and loaded for a voyage to Australia. But carpenters' wages were then very high – $7.00 a day – and so apparently very little was done to the vessel to make her seaworthy.

The Jacatra belonged to Duncan McGregor & Co. of Glasgow, and the owner's son Malcolm McGregor was out on his second voyage in her with a view to being trained to become a sea captain. Nisbet spoke to him about the unseaworthy way the ship was repaired. McGregor agreed, and went ashore. The next day Nisbet and six of the crew left three days before the Jacatra was posted to sail, and the rest of the crew followed. The captain, mate, second mate, cook, and carpenter were left on board. Nevertheless, the Jacatra arrived in Sydney on 15 November 1857 without Malcolm McGregor on board.

At San Francisco Nisbet joined a steamboat for the first time – the large paddle steamer Columbia, of New York. He sailed in the Columbia for about six months between San Francisco and Portland, Oregon on wages of $40.00 a month.

In about November 1857, Nisbet decided to return home but he could not get a British ship at San Francisco. He joined the Swedish ship Atlantic of Luleå under Captain C. A. Carlstein, and was in her for almost a year. The crew that shipped at San Francisco left the vessel in Callao, Peru. A second crew was secured, and, after doing another trip, the Atlantic returned to Callao to sail from there to Europe. There the crew again left, and only one Swede and young Nisbet remained. A third crew was shipped and as Nisbet could understand orders and could also make them understood, he was chosen as interpreter. The Atlantic was bound for Cowes, Isle of Wight, and reached there after a five months passage.

During the passage Nisbet acted as sailmaker, and at this time made his first start with navigation, under the instruction of Captain Carlstein, who lent him books on the subject.

At Cowes the ship was ordered to go to Hamburg, and at Glückstadt, Germany the crew were paid off. Nisbet then returned to England, and decided to go to his home in the Shetland Islands, where he would take a three months holiday and study navigation. When he was about to leave for the south to pass the Board examinations, he was asked to go to Southampton with an old shipmaster, to bring home a vessel to the Shetland Islands.

The vessel, which was the schooner Novice, was bought for Captain Arthur Pottinger of Scalloway on the island of Mainland, Shetland. However, Captain Pottinger was unfit to sail in the Novice on account of advancing years. In April 1859 Nisbet was appointed master of the Novice, and on 9 May of that year first sailed as master of that craft. The Novice was engaged in the Faroe Islands, Davis Straits, and Shetland Islands trade.

With this object in view, a larger vessel, the Imogen, was purchased, and a request was forwarded to Nisbet to take command of the new vessel. It was a new venture, and the promoters thought that, with one in command possessed of the energy and ability of Nisbet, it would prove a success; and it did. The Imogen traded to Uyeasound, Baltasound and Haroldswick on the Shetland island of Unst.

Nisbet sailed for several seasons to the Faroe Islands fishing, gaining new experiences in that hazardous business.

Nisbet had been in the Imogen for only five months, when he was asked in August 1865 to take over command of the clipper Matchless from Captain James Aitken. He had gained his Certificate of Competency as Master of a Home Trade Passenger Ship on 21 August 1865. The Matchless was engaged in the packet trade between Leith and Lerwick, Mainland, Shetland. For the next ten years, until 1875, Nisbet traded in the Matchless between Leith and Shetland. The Matchless was a well known trader in Leith, and at that time was recognised as one of the finest and fastest clippers sailing out of the port. On one occasion Nisbet went with the Matchless from Lerwick to Leith in 27 hours. Nisbet is reported as saying: "She was a bonnie ship, the Matchless and I think that was the best ten years of my life – the time I was in her."

During the time that Nisbet was in command of the Matchless, he acted as commission agent for the sale of north country products, and did business with such Leith firms as Messrs Aitken & Wright, J. & J. Stewart, J.S. Linklater and J. & J. Tod.

The increased trade of Scalloway on the west side of Mainland, Shetland in the mid-nineteenth century led to cargo vessels running in from Leith. Most famous was the clipper Queen of the Isles of 82 tons, built at Leith in 1845 for a Shetland syndicate. In 1875 Nisbet acquired an interest in the Queen of the Isles, trading between Leith and the west side of Shetland. Nisbet who skippered the Queen of the Isles for many years, proved a key figure in the island service with his long experience of the dangerous passage up the west side of Shetland.

Five years later in 1880 saw the inauguration of the first steamboat between Leith and the west side of Shetland. Nisbet provided such a good service for passengers and traders that, when the North of Scotland, Orkney & Shetland Steam Navigation Company provided a Shetland west-side run from Leith and Aberdeen via Stromness, Orkney in 1881, he was invited to take command of the 254-ton steamship SS Queen. The SS Queen had been acquired by the North of Scotland, Orkney & Shetland Steam Navigation Company in 1861. It was the first screw-driven ship used regularly on the Shetland run.

In 1881 a third weekly run began from Leith on Mondays to Aberdeen, Stromness and Scalloway, the west-side service going on from Scalloway to other ports on the west side of Shetland, a service that continued with variations until 1939.

When master of the first west-side steamer, Nisbet organised all kinds of private arrangements before the erection of official lighthouses. A lamp in a crofter's cottage guided him through Vaila Sound into Walls, Shetland and a lamp in the staircase window of Melby House helped him negotiate Papa Sound, a service he acknowledged with a blast on the ship's whistle as he passed.

Nisbet was employed by the North of Scotland, Orkney & Shetland Steam Navigation Company for over 30 years and was in charge of various of their vessels, including the St Ninian and the St. Nicholas.

He was a member and elder of St. Ninian's United Free Church of Scotland at Leith.

== Personal life ==
On 23 February 1860 Nisbet married Catherine Barbara Taylor who was a niece on her mother's side of John Clunies-Ross, King of the Cocos (Keeling) Islands. They had 10 children of whom two died in infancy. The family was based in Lerwick but moved to Leith sometime before 1881.

Nisbet, died at his residence, 4 Dudley Terrace, Leith, on 3 May 1917 at the age of 82 having retired from his command some years earlier. His wife predeceased him and he was buried next to her in Rosebank Cemetery, Edinburgh.

== Sources ==
=== Articles ===
Halcrow, Captain A, The Clipper Matchless, Sea Breezes (1933) Vol. XVI, No. 160, pp. 264–265, 267.

=== Books ===
Balneaves, Elizabeth, The Windswept Isles John Gifford, London, 1977.

Cowsill, Miles and Smith, Colin, Passage to the Northern Isles: Ferry Services to Orkney and Shetland 1790–2010, Ferry Publications, Ramsey, 2010.

Manson, Thomas Lerwick During the Last Half Century (1867–1917) Lerwick Community Council, 1991.

Nicolson, James R., Shetland David and Charles, 1971.

Robertson, Margaret Stuart, Sons and Daughters of Shetland available at http://shetlandroots.org/index.php

=== Newspapers ===
Otago Daily Times 21 April 1868.

Shetland News 4 January 1896, 22 May 1909, 17 May 1917.

=== Official records ===
State Records Authority of New South Wales: Shipping Master's Office; Passengers Arriving 1855 – 1922; NRS13278, [X97-98] reel 405. Available at http://mariners.records.nsw.gov.au/1857/11/024jac.htm
