= Robert Nisbet (disambiguation) =

Robert Nisbet (1913–1996) was conservative American sociologist.

Robert Nisbet may also refer to:

- Robert Nisbet (sea captain) (1834–1917), Shetland sea captain
- Robert Nisbet (journalist) (born 1968), British former journalist, now working as Regional Director for the Rail Delivery Group
- Robert Nisbet (minister) (1814–1874), Scottish minister of the Church of Scotland and religious author
- Robert Nisbet (rower) (1900–1986), British rower
- Robert Parry Nisbet (1793–1882), British sheriff and member of parliament
- Bob Nisbet (born 1936), Australian footballer
- Robin Nisbet (1925–2013), Professor of Latin Literature

== See also ==
- Robert Nesbitt (disambiguation)
