= Unst Airport =

Airport near Baltasound, Unst, Shetland, Scotland

Unst/Baltasound Airport
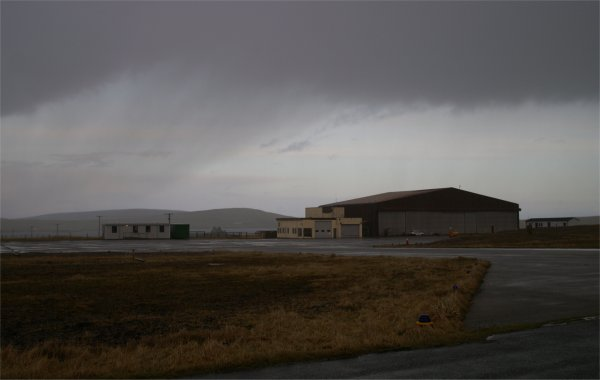
- IATA: UNT; ICAO: EGPW

Summary
- Airport type: Private
- Owner/Operator: Shetland Islands Council
- Serves: Unst
- Location: Baltasound
- Elevation AMSL: 62 ft / 19 m
- Coordinates: 60°44′49″N 0°51′17″W

Map
- Location in Shetland

Runways
Direction	Length		Surface
Direction	m	ft	Surface
12/30	640	2,100	Hard

Unst Airport also called Baltasound Airport is an unlicensed airfield near Baltasound, on the island of Unst, Shetland Islands, Scotland. The airfield has effectively been mothballed since 1996 and is now only used by the emergency services. Unst Airport is the most northerly airfield in the United Kingdom.

== History ==
Unst Airport opened in August 1968 although its official opening happened in 1970. The airport was built by the 15 Field Squadron (Search) RE of the Royal Engineers.

=== Mothballing ===
In 1996 the oil rig operators decided to concentrate their resources at Scatsta Airport on the Shetland Mainland. The last scheduled flights to the airport were withdrawn on March 29, 1996, and the airport was mothballed. After the airport was mothballed the airport's control tower and terminal building were subsequently demolished.

== Current use ==
Currently, Unst Airport is only used by the emergency services for occasional Air Ambulance flights. There are no scheduled flights operating from Unst Airport.

== Future ==
In 2013 it was reported that the American oil giant Chevron was looking into the possibility of re-opening the airport for use with the Rosebank oil and gas field. The Shetland Space Centre intends to incorporate it into a local space industry hub, and in 2019 a space balloon has been launched from it.
