= May Moar =

UK lifeboat rescuer (1825–1894)

- Born: May or Marjory Hectorson; 1825; Unst
- Died: 2 June 1894 (aged 68–69); Baltasound
- Occupation: Crofter

May Moar or Marjory Moar born May Hectorson (1825 – 2 June 1894) was a British crofter in the Shetland Isles who was awarded an RNLI silver medal for rescuing fishermen off the island of Yell.

== Life ==
Moar was born in Unst in 1825. She was one of six children born to Williamina Anderson and Laurence Hectorson. Her father was drowned the following year. She was fostered by another family and she went to live on the nearby island of Yell. She married a fisherman named David Moar in 1847.

She came to notice when she, her husband and a group of others saw a four oared boat that had overturned. She was lowered over the edge of a precipice on a rope so that she could make a rescue. She balanced on a ledge and she was able to throw a lifebuoy to the crew. Once caught they were able to be pulled to the shore. Her husband saved others.

She was awarded a medal by the Royal Humane Society and a silver medal by the Royal National Lifeboat Institution.

Her heroism did not prevent her and her family from being evicted from their home of Yell during the clearances. Disaster struck her again when her husband drowned with 57 others in the Gloup Fishing Disaster. The disaster involved fisherman who were lost on 20 July 1867 at Gloup on the northern part of Yell. He was fishing in an open boat known as a sixareen when an unexpected storm from Iceland sank four of the boats. She returned as a widow to Unst.

Moar died in Baltasound in 1894. After her death her silver medal was found discarded in a dyke. It was retrieved and is now in Shetland Museum. Jessie Saxby who was a writer and suffragette from Unst wrote a short story about Moar called "Daughter of Sea Kings".
