= Unst Bus Shelter =

Bus stop near Baltasound on Unst, Scotland

Coordinates: 60.765158°N 0.835087°W

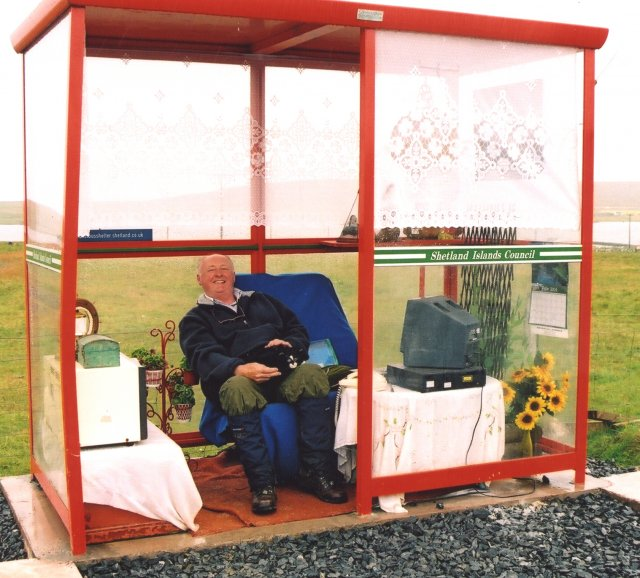
Unst Bus Shelter, July 2004

The Unst Bus Shelter, also known as Bobby's Bus Shelter, is a bus shelter and bus stop near the village of Baltasound, on the isle of Unst, Shetland Islands, Scotland. It is maintained by the Shetland Islands Council. It is located on the main road across Unst – the A968 – which runs between Belmont and Haroldswick.

The name "Bobby's Bus Shelter" honours Bobby Macaulay, a child who used to cycle to the shelter in the mornings to catch the bus to school. The local council had plans to remove the bus shelter in 1996, but after the seven-year-old sent them a letter asking them not to and explaining that the shelter is where he kept his bike while at school, the council left it there and local volunteers furnished and decorated it.

The shelter has a sofa and a television. It is furnished and redecorated periodically. For example, in 2010 it was given World Cup themed decoration due to Macaulay's visit to South Africa to see the 2010 FIFA World Cup, and each year by local residents with a sofa, television, computer and other home comforts.

| Year | Theme |
|---|---|
| 2002 | Golden jubilee |
2003
| 2004 | Underwater |
| 2005 | Africa |
| 2006 | Space |
| 2007 | Yellow |
| 2008 | Blue |
| 2009 | Pink |
| 2010 | World Cup |
| 2011 | Tall ships |
| 2012 | Diamond Jubilee |
| 2013 | Sheep |
| 2014 | Tribute to Nelson Mandela |
| 2015 | Puffins |
| 2016 | Flowers |
| 2017 | |
| 2018 | 100 years of women's suffrage in the United Kingdom |
| 2019 | Fake Gnus |
| 2020 | 2020 Vision |
| 2021 | COP26 and the environment |
| 2022 | Platinum Jubilee of Elizabeth II |
| 2023 | Nautical themed |
| 2024 | Leap Year |
| 2025 | Bees |
| 2026 | Alice in Wonderland |

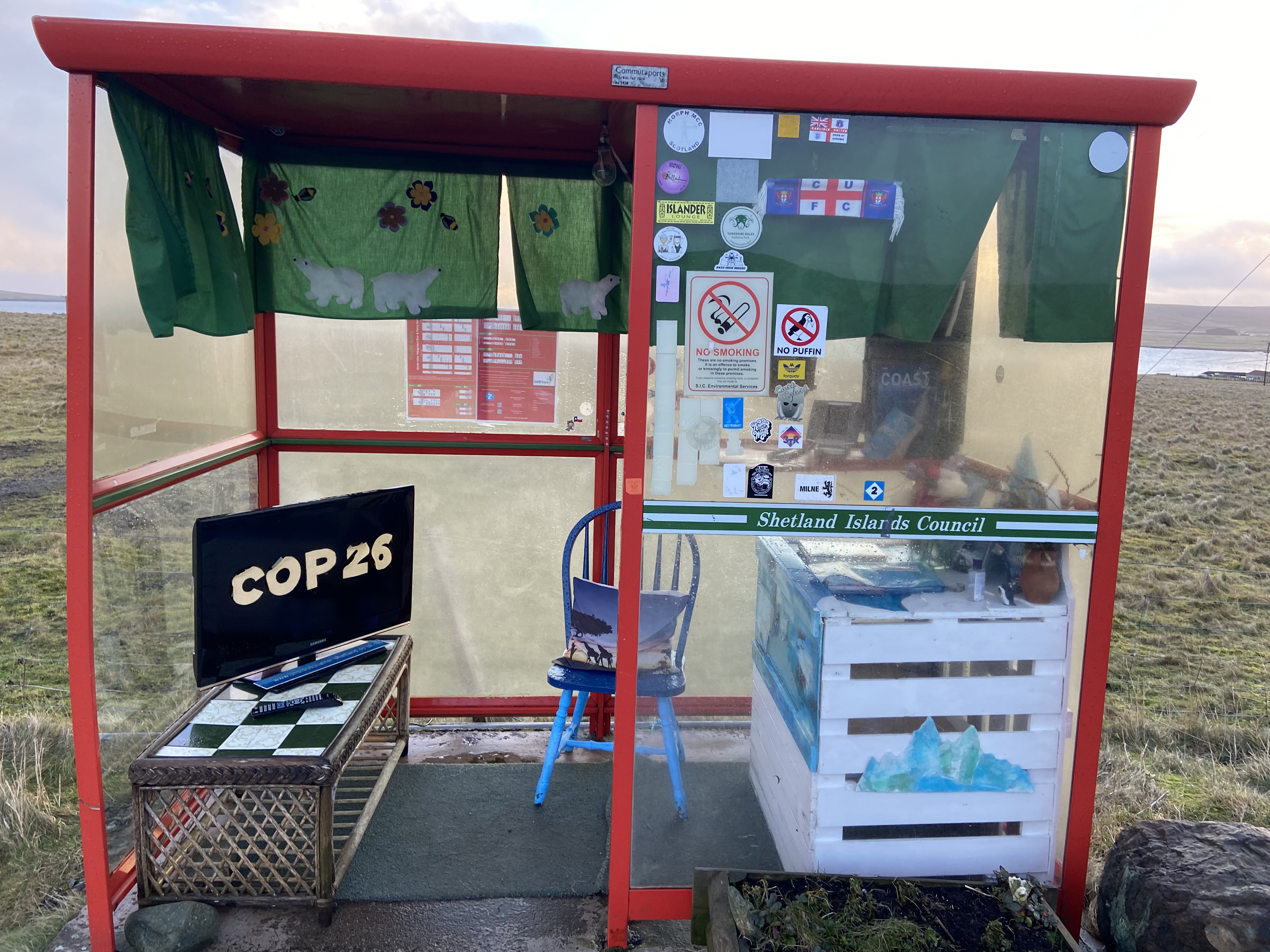
Unst Bus Shelter in December 2021
