= Robert Nesbitt =

Robert Nesbitt may refer to:

- Robert Nesbitt (physician) (died 1761), English physician
- Robert Nesbitt (theatre director) (1906–1995), English theatre director, theatrical producer and impresario
- Robert Nesbitt (solicitor) (1868–1944), British solicitor and Unionist politician
- Robert Taylor Nesbitt (1843–1913), American politician in Georgia
- Robert H. Nesbitt (1883–1966), Australian trade commissioner to New Zealand
- Robert "Rab" C. Nesbitt, the lead character in the Scottish comedy series Rab C. Nesbitt

== See also ==
- Robert Nisbet (disambiguation)
