= Muness Castle =

Castle on Unst, Scotland

Coordinates: 60°41′22.19″N 0°50′57.04″W

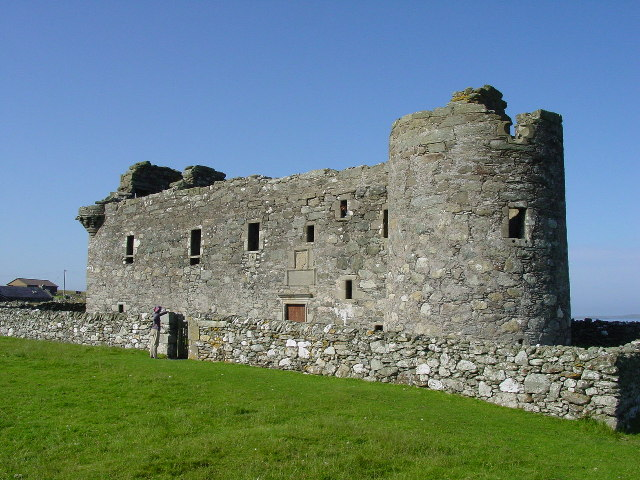
Muness Castle

Muness Castle is located on Unst, which is one of the Shetland Islands of Scotland. The castle is three kilometres (two miles) east of the village of Uyeasound. Unst is Scotland's most northerly inhabited island, and Muness is the most northerly fortalice in the British Isles. It was designated as a Scheduled monument in 1953 and is run as a museum by Historic Environment Scotland.

== History ==
The castle was built in 1598 for Laurence Bruce of Cultmalindie, half-brother to Robert Stewart, 1st Earl of Orkney. Earl Robert was succeeded by his son Patrick in 1593. The building may have been constructed under the direction of Andrew Crawford, Earl Patrick's master of works, who also oversaw the construction of Scalloway Castle and the Earl's Palace at Kirkwall, Orkney. Bruce gave the castle to his son Andrew in 1617. It was burnt by foreign privateers in August 1627, and may never have been fully repaired. It was abandoned before the end of the century and it was sold out of the family in 1718. The castle is now roofless and missing its upper storey which was removed to build the surrounding boundary wall. Aerial photographs reveal the possible presence of a formal garden to the south-west of the castle.

== Description ==
The castle forms a rectangular block 22.3 by 7.9 metres (73 ft 2 in × 25 ft 11 in) with circular towers at the north and south angles. The ground floor and first storey survive virtually intact and the corbelling supports for small turrets on the east and west corners on the second storey remain. The roof was probably gabled and the towers likely had conical roofs. The entrance is located on the south-western side and is covered by gun loops in the main block and in the south-eastern tower.

== Bibliography ==
- Tranter, Nigel (1970). The Fortified House in Scotland. Vol. 5: North and West Scotland and Miscellaneous. Edinburgh: Oliver and Boyd/W. & R. Chambers. ISBN 978-0-550-21210-8.
