= Saxa Vord distillery =

Scottish gin distillery on Unst

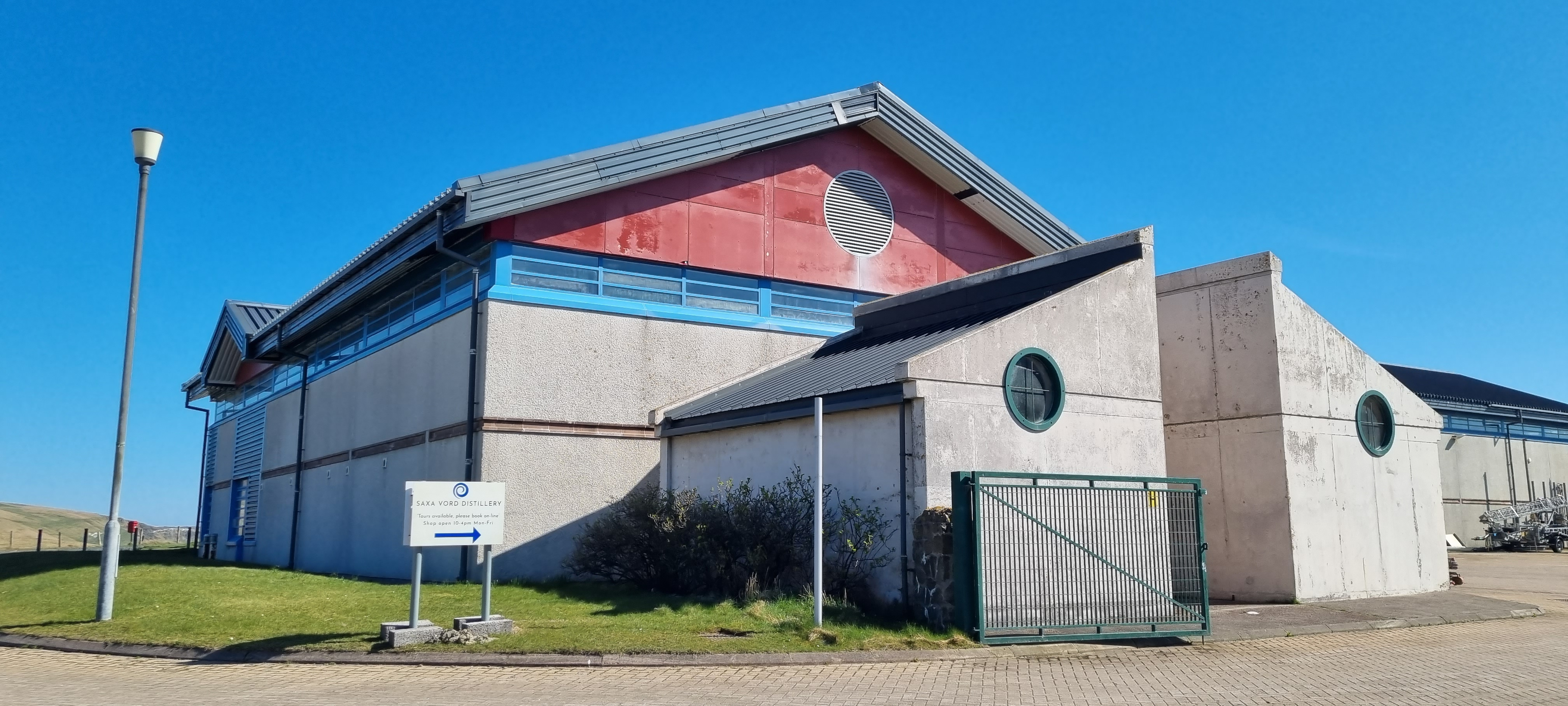

Region: Island
- Location: Saxa Vord, Haroldswick, Unst, Shetland ZE2 9EF, Scotland, United Kingdom
- Coordinates: 60.7978°N 0.824°W
- Owner: Shetland Distillery Company
- Founded: 2014
- Founder: Wilma & Stuart Nickerson; Frank & Debbie Strang
- Capacity: 30,000 litres
- Website: www.shetlandreel.com

Saxa Vord distillery is a gin distillery on the island of Unst, Shetland. The distillery releases products under the Shetland Reel brand name.

The distillery takes its name from its location immediately south of RAF Saxa Vord, an RAF station and headland. The site is adjacent to the SaxaVord Spaceport, which has been referenced in some special-edition gin releases.

It is the most northerly distillery in the United Kingdom, and the first legal distillery in the Shetland islands.

== History ==
The distillery is co-owned by two couples: Wilma and Stuart Nickerson, and Frank and Debbie Strang. Stuart Nickerson had previously worked for Grant's and Glenglassaugh distillery; Frank and Debbie Strang had previously been involved in the redevelopment of RRH Saxa Vord and owned Saxa Resort holiday park. The Strangs had been part of a previous attempt to establish a distillery on the site in 2007.

In 2013, the company submitted plans to Shetland Islands Council proposing to modify former RAF buildings at Saxa Vord to house the distillery. The distillery is located in the former supply depot. The development was part-funded by a £17,000 grant from Highlands and Islands Enterprise.

The first gin was produced in August 2014. The launch was marked by a special concert in Unst led by country music musician Jim Salestrom.

In 2018, the company announced a fundraising drive to raise £4.5 million in order to construct a proposed single malt whisky distillery at the site, next to the existing gin distillery. As of 2022, the company had not successfully raised the funds to begin whisky production.

== Products ==
The standard Shetland Reel gin is made with 8 botanicals, including apple mint grown in a polytunnel on Unst. The distillery has also released a limited edition cask-aged gin, and a gin liqueur containing locally-grown brambles and rhubarb.

The distillery also produce a range of independently bottled whiskies. In September 2015, they released the first Shetland Reel branded whiskies: a set of four single malts sourced from Glenglassagh distillery. The casks were transported by ferry from the Scottish mainland to the island. They were marketed as the first whiskies to be "bottled in Shetland". After subsequently receiving permission from HMRC to mature whisky in bond at the distillery for up to six months, the company released a blended malt that had been finished on Unst. This was the first Scotch whisky release to be partially matured in Shetland.

During the Covid-19 pandemic, the distillery bottled hand sanitiser - under the brand name "Reel Clean Hands" - for NHS Shetland and local key workers.

The company exports its products to several markets, including the US, Canada and Sweden, as well as operating an online shop.
