= Hagdale Chromate Railway =

Railway line in Shetland, Scotland

Overview
- Headquarters: Baltasound
- Locale: Isle of Unst, Scotland
- Dates of operation: 1907–1937
- Successor: Abandoned

Technical
- Track gauge: 2 ft 6 in (762 mm)
- Length: 1 1/2 mi (2.4 km)

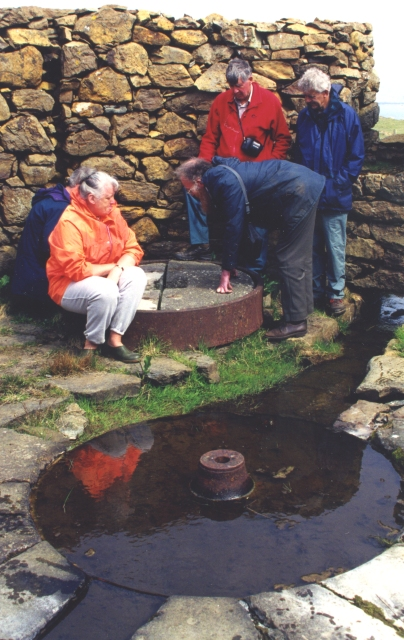
Hagdale Chromite Mill

The Hagdale Chromate Railway was a 2 ft 6 in (762 mm) narrow-gauge railway on the Isle of Unst, in the Shetland Islands. Built in 1907, it connected the chromite quarries at Hagdale with a pier at Baltasound. None of Shetland's few narrow-gauge railways were preserved.
