= Uyeasound =

Coordinates: 60.689°N 0.919°W

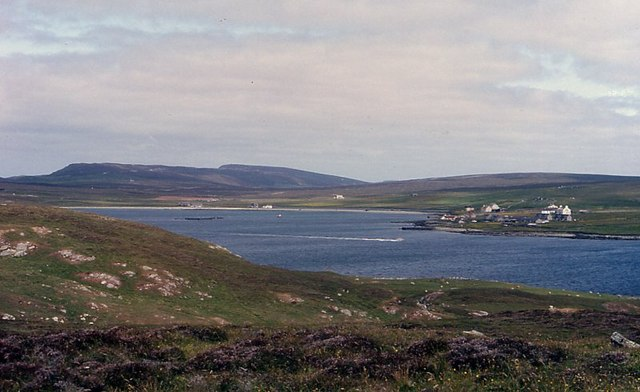
- View from the Isle of Uyea, showing both the village and the sound of the same name

- Location within Shetland
- OS grid reference: HP590010
- Civil parish: Unst
- Council area: Shetland
- Lieutenancy area: Shetland
- Country: Scotland
- Sovereign state: United Kingdom
- Post town: SHETLAND
- Postcode district: ZE2
- Dialling code: 01957
- Police: Scotland
- Fire: Scottish
- Ambulance: Scottish
- UK Parliament: Orkney and Shetland
- Scottish Parliament: Shetland

Uyeasound (Shaetlan pronunciation: [ˈjuiˌsund] YOO-ee-soond) is a village on the Isle of Unst, the northernmost island of the Shetland Islands, Scotland. It takes its name from the neighbouring strait of the same name, which looks over to the Isle of Uyea.

Uyeasound is home to Greenwell's Booth, a Hanseatic trading storehouse, as well as Muness Castle.

== In popular culture ==
English rock band The Cure's 1993 EP, Lost Wishes, features an instrumental track titled "Uyea Sound".
