= Unst =

Northernmost Shetland Island, Scotland

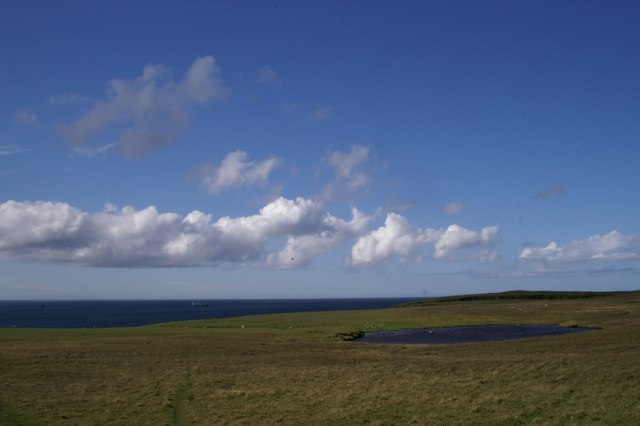
- Kidna Water

Location
- Unst shown within Shetland
- OS grid reference: HP600091
- Coordinates: 60.75°N 0.89°W

Name
- Old Norse name: Ǫmstr

Physical geography
- Island group: Shetland
- Area: 46 sq mi (120 km^{2})
- Area rank: 14
- Highest elevation: Saxa Vord, 284 m (932 ft)

Administration
- Council area: Shetland Islands
- Country: Scotland
- Sovereign state: United Kingdom

Demographics
- Population: 644
- Population rank: 19
- Population density: 5.3 people/km²
- Largest settlement: Baltasound

Unst (/ˈʌnst/; Norn: Ønst) is one of the North Isles of the Shetland Islands, Scotland. It is the northernmost of the inhabited British Isles and is the third-largest island in Shetland after Mainland and Yell. It has an area of 46 sq mi (120 km^{2}).

Unst is largely grassland, with coastal cliffs. Its main village is Baltasound, formerly the second-largest herring fishing port after Lerwick and now the location of a leisure centre and the island's airport. Other settlements include Uyeasound, home to Greenwell's Booth (a Hanseatic warehouse) and Muness Castle (built in 1598 and sacked by pirates in 1627); and Haroldswick, location of a boat museum and a heritage centre.

== Etymology ==
There are three island names in Shetland of unknown and possibly pre-Celtic origin: Unst, Fetlar and Yell. The earliest recorded forms of these three names do carry Norse meanings: Fetlar is the plural of fetill and means 'shoulder-straps', Ǫmstr is 'corn-stack' and í Ála is from ál meaning 'deep furrow'.

However, these descriptions are hardly obvious ones as island names and are probably adaptations of a pre-Norse language. This may have been Pictish but there is no clear evidence for this. Taylor (1898) has suggested a derivation from the Old Norse Ornyst meaning 'eagle's nest'.

== History ==
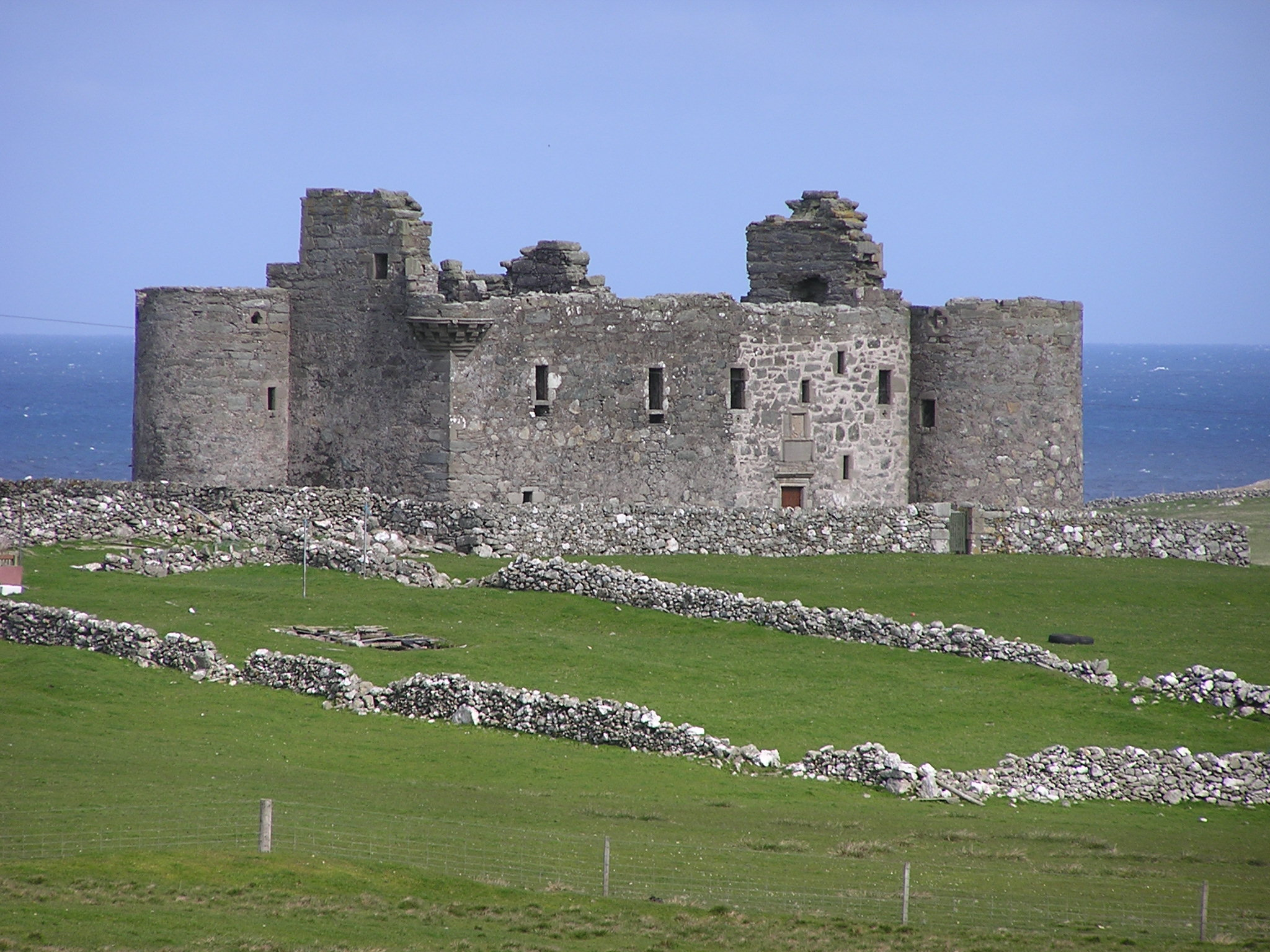
Muness Castle

The Shetland Amenity Trust's "Viking Unst" project excavated and displayed part of the island's Norse heritage. Work was undertaken on three longhouses – of which 60 are known to be on the island – at Hamar, Underhoull and Belmont. The replica Viking ship Skibladner can currently be seen ashore at Haroldswick.

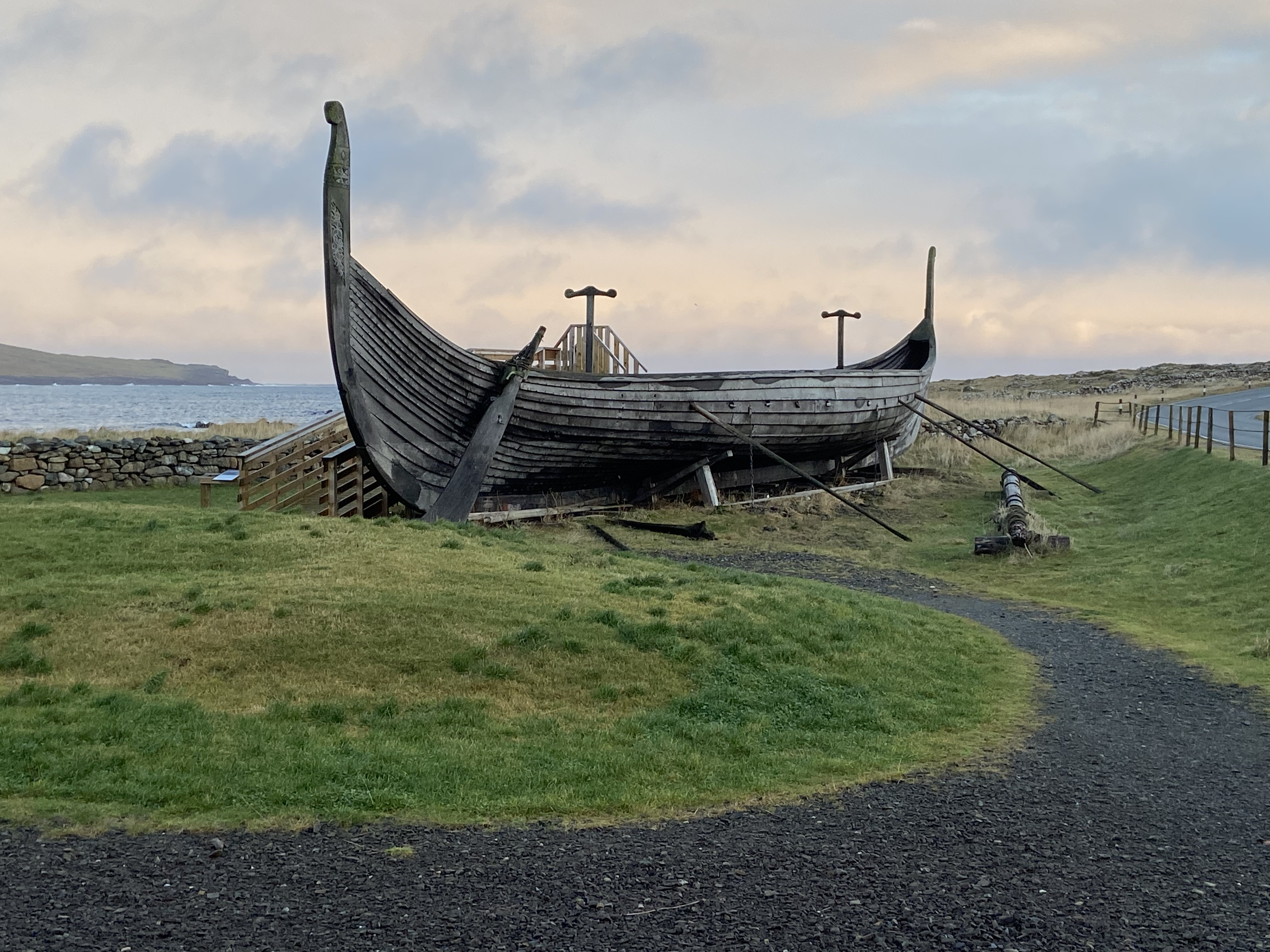
Skibladner, Unst

The remains of pre-12th-century Christian chapels survive on Unst: St Olaf's Chapel, Lund, and Our Lady's Kirk at Framgord, Sandwick on the south east coast. Norse-style cross-shaped gravestones stand in the surrounding burial grounds at both Lund and Framgord, and rare "keelstone" burial markers survive at Framgord. Late Norse longhouses have been identified around both bays; the house at Sandwick still retains its cow-shaped byre door.

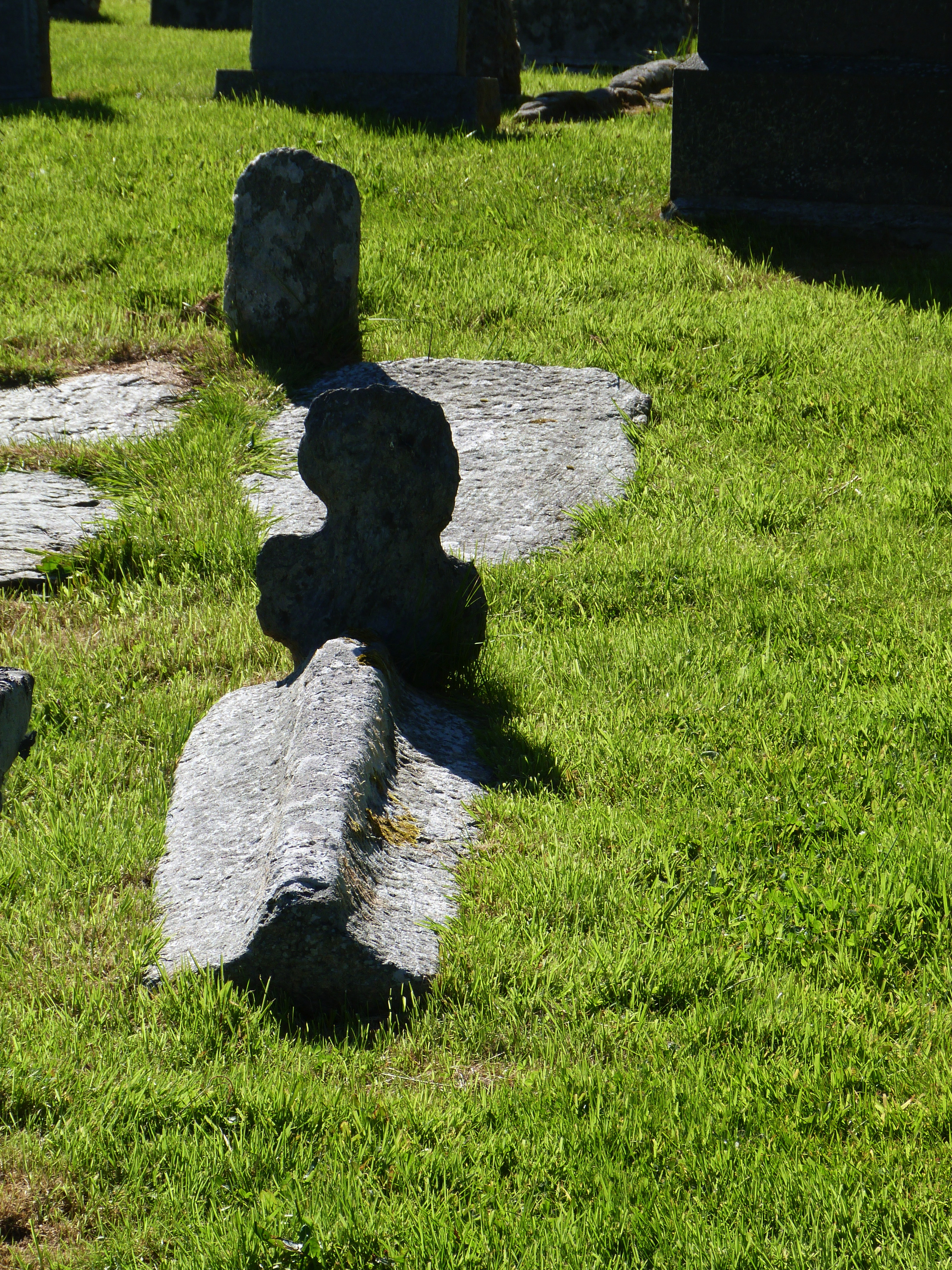
Small cross-shaped marker with a grave stone shaped like the keel of an inverted ship at the late-Norse Christian Chapel at Framgord, Sandwick.

James Hepburn, 4th Earl of Bothwell sailed to Shetland after the Battle of Carberry Hill. He was at the house of Olave Sinclair, the receiver or sheriff of Shetland on Unst, in July 1567 when his enemies arrived in three ships, and he fought a sea battle for three hours before sailing to Norway. A later sheriff, Laurence Bruce, built Muness Castle in 1598.

The Rev Dr James Ingram (1776–1879) was minister of Unst from 1821. In the Disruption of 1843, he and most of the Unst population, left the established church and joined the Free Church of Scotland (a very typical pattern in the Highlands and Islands). He erected a new church at Uyeasound, funded by the Countess of Effingham. Ingram retired in 1875 aged 99 and died aged a remarkable 103. His father and grandfather also lived to over 100.

Robert Louis Stevenson's father and uncle were the main design engineers for the lighthouse on Muckle Flugga, just off Hermaness on the north-west of the island. Stevenson visited Unst, and the island is claimed to have become the basis for the map of the fictional Treasure Island – a claim shared by Fidra in East Lothian.

In the 1950s, a Canadian sociologist, Erving Goffman, undertook a year of ethnographic research on Unst for his doctoral thesis, which underpinned his best known publication, The Presentation of Self in Everyday Life (1956) and the dramaturgy approach he developed.

== Geography and geology ==
The island lays claim to many "most northerly" UK titles: the tiny settlement of Skaw in the north-east of the island is the northernmost settlement in the UK; Haroldswick is the site of Britain's most northerly church; the Muckle Flugga lighthouse, just off the far north of Unst, was opened in 1858 and is the most northerly lighthouse in the UK, situated close to Out Stack, the most northerly rock in the UK. Western Norway is 200 miles (300 km) away.

The islands of Unst and Fetlar are mainly formed of ultramafic and mafic igneous rocks which are interpreted to form part of an ophiolite, a section of oceanic crust from the Iapetus Ocean which was thrust on top of the ancient continental rocks during the Caledonian orogeny. This slice of rock is about the length of Unst and nearby Fetlar and has remained there for the last 420 million years. The western side of Unst was not covered by the ophiolite rock so is the original continental basement sandstones that were metamorphosed into Gneiss and Schist by the pressure of the Caledonian mountain-building orogeny. (see Belmont, Shetland for further details on the geology of southern Unst)

Unst was once the location of several chromite quarries, one of which was served by the now-disused Hagdale Chromate Railway from 1907 to 1937. Unst is the type locality for the mineral theophrastite, a nickel-magnesium variant of the mineral, (Ni,Mg)(OH)_{2}, having been discovered at Hagdale in 1960.

On 7 January 2007, Unst was shaken by an earthquake measuring 4.9 on the Richter scale, which at the time was assessed by the British Geological Survey as "the largest earthquake of its kind in the area for 10 years".

== Economy and transport ==
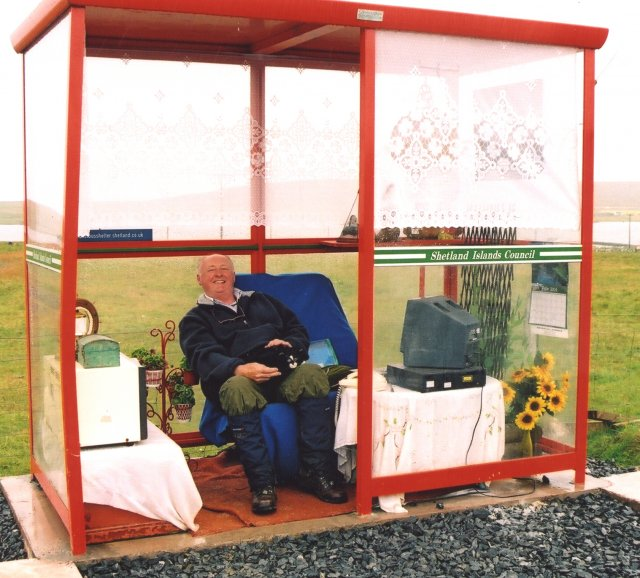
The Unst Bus Shelter

Ferries link Belmont on the island to Gutcher on Yell and Oddsta on Fetlar.

The Unst Bus Shelter, also known as Bobby's Bus Shelter after a child who saved it from removal, is a bus shelter and bus stop near the village of Baltasound which is equipped with home comforts such as a television set, and is maintained by local residents.

Unst is also home to the Promoting Unst Renewable Energy (PURE) Wind Hydrogen project, a community-owned clean energy system based on hydrogen production. This project is part of the Unst Partnership, the community's development trust. The Pure Energy Centre was formed using the skills and knowledge gained during the PURE Project and has installed hydrogen systems in diverse locations.

At the southern end of Unst, above the island's ferry terminal, stands Belmont House. Dating from 1775, Belmont has been described as "possibly the most ambitious, least-altered classical mansion in the Northern Isles". It was restored between 1996 and 2010 by a charitable trust, who now operate the building as a venue for hire.

The island's population was 632 as recorded by the 2011 census, a drop of over 12% since 2001 when there were 720 usual residents. During the same period Scottish island populations as a whole grew by 4% to 103,702. By the time of the 2022 census the population had increased slightly to 644.

In 2016, the island was the subject of Series 11 of BBC Two's An Island Parish.

The island has an airstrip, the Unst Airport, which has been decommissioned as an airport, has no regular flights and is only used for emergencies.

=== Saxa Vord ===
Saxa Vord is the highest hill on Unst at 935 ft (285 m). It holds the unofficial British record for wind speed, which in 1992 was recorded at 197 mph (317 km/h) — just before the measuring equipment blew away.

==== RAF Saxa Vord ====
The weather station which recorded the windspeed was part of Royal Air Force radar station RAF Saxa Vord, which temporarily closed in 2006, with the loss of more than 100 jobs.

In April 2007, RAF Saxa Vord's domestic site, plus the road up to the Mid Site, was purchased and renamed "Saxa Vord Resort" by Highland entrepreneur Frank Strang. Strang's company Military Asset Management (MAM) "specialises in the regeneration of redundant or surplus Defence Assets". The base was converted to a tourist resort and natural and cultural heritage centre. In 2013, Saxa Vord had self-catering holiday houses, a 26-bedroom bunkhouse, restaurant and bar, leisure facilities and a guided walks/evening talks programme. Three local businesses relocated their premises to the Saxa Vord site: Unst Cycle Hire, Valhalla Brewery and Foord's Chocolates, Shetland's only chocolatier.

A few years later the radar station resumed operations as Remote Radar Head Saxa Vord.

==== Distillery ====
Saxa Vord distillery is a gin distillery on Unst.

==== Spaceport ====
In 2017, Frank Strang established the Shetland Space Centre Ltd and proposed that Lamba Ness would make a suitable launch site for rockets taking satellites into polar orbits. In October 2020, the proposal was given more substance by the announcement that the UK Space Agency had given its approval and that Lockheed Martin was intending to use the site as a UK base for its rocket launches.

Despite its name, the location of "SaxaVord Spaceport" is near the easternmost point of Unst, several kilometers removed from Saxa Vord hill.

In January 2021, plans were submitted for three rocket launch pads and the UK Civil Aviation Authority (CAA) announced on 17 December 2023 that SaxaVord had been granted a spaceport licence "to host up to 30 launches a year", making it "the first fully licensed vertical spaceport in Western Europe."

== Wildlife ==
Unst is important for its seabird colonies, including those at Hermaness National Nature Reserve. It is also known for its plant life, including the Norwegian sandwort and Shetland Mouse-ear, the latter unique to the island.

On the island, the commonly seen Great skua is known as the "bonxie".

== Notable people ==
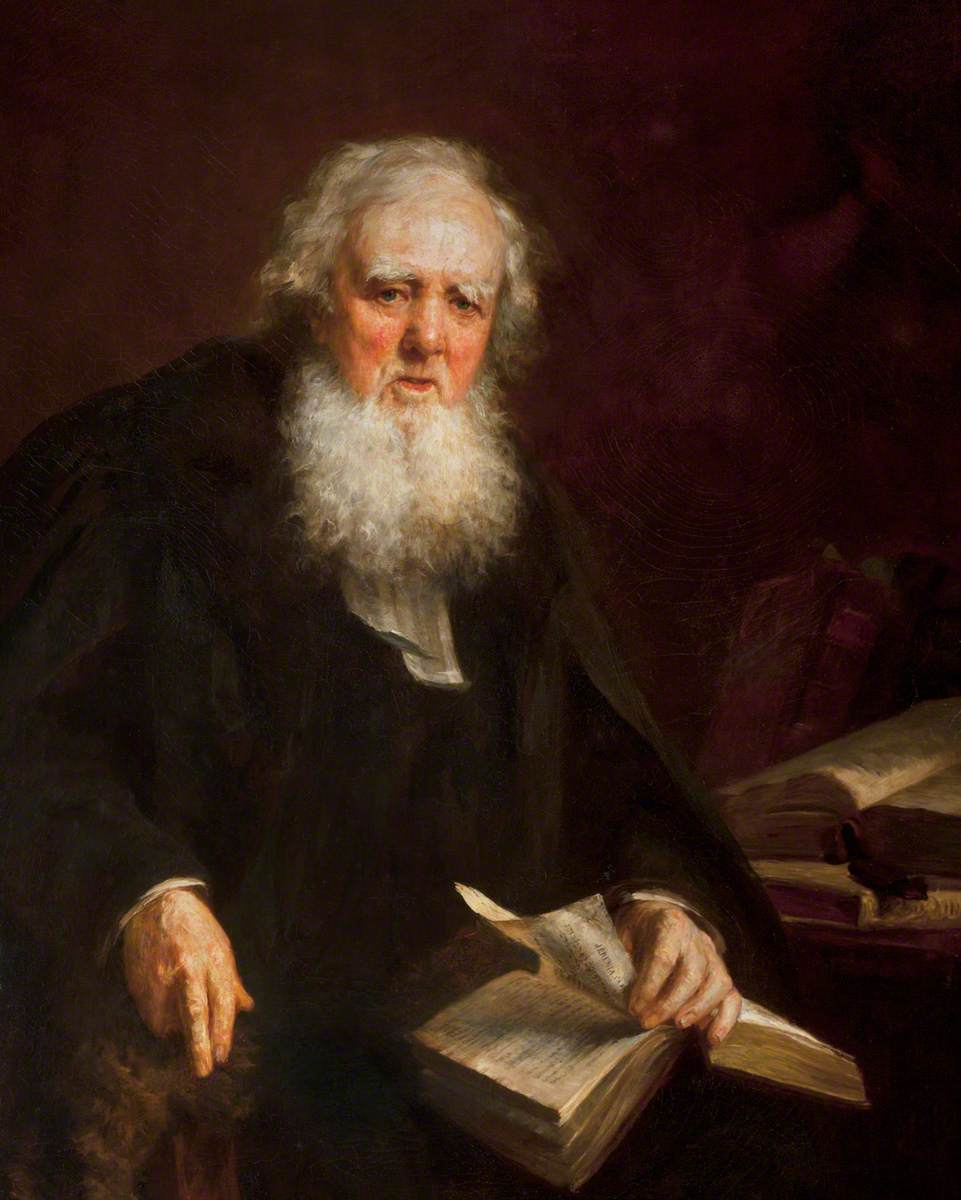
James Ingram by Otto Leyde (1872)

- Walter Sutherland (died c. 1850), a former inhabitant of the northernmost cottage in Britain, was reportedly the last native speaker of the Norn language.
- Thomas Barclay, born on Unst in 1792 was a Principal of the University of Glasgow.
- Laurence Edmondston, born in Shetland in 1795, was a medical doctor and GP for Unst.
- John Gray (1819–1872), born on Unst, Captain of the SS Great Britain
- Thomas Edmondston, born on Unst in 1825, was a botanist.
- James Ingram (1776–1879), Presbyterian minister who spent most of his life working in the parishes of Fetlar and Unst. Ingram wrote the New Statistical Account of the parish of Unst in 1831; his father-in-law and Thomas Mouat of Garth wrote the Old Statistical Account in 1791.
- May Moar was born on Unst in 1825 and gained an RNLI medal.
- Jessie Saxby, born on Unst in 1842, was a folklorist and writer.
- Sinclair Ferguson (born 1948), theologian and preacher, was Church of Scotland minister on Unst.

== See also ==
- List of islands of Scotland
- Society of Our Lady of the Isles
