= RRH Saxa Vord =

Royal Air Force air defence radar on Unst, Shetland, Scotland, United Kingdom

RRH Saxa Vord
- Unst, Shetland Islands in Scotland
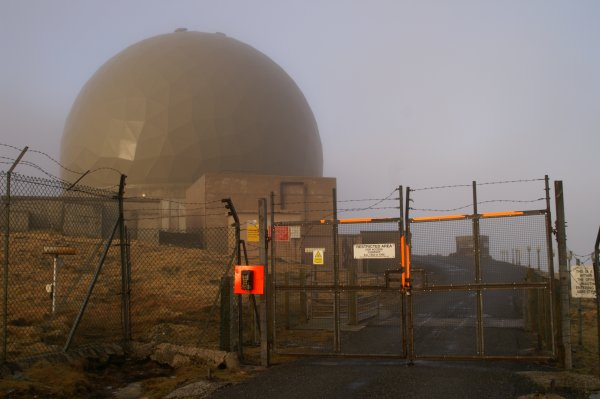
- Radar dome at RRS Saxa Vord.

- Praemoneo de Periculis (Latin for 'I warn of danger')

Site information
- Type: Remote Radar Head
- Owner: Ministry of Defence
- Operator: Royal Air Force
- Controlled by: Air Command and Control Force
- Condition: Operational
- Radar type: Lockheed Martin AN/TPS-77 (Type 92) Air Defence Radar

Location
- Shown within Shetland
- Coordinates: 60°49′39″N 0°50′28″W
- Area: 8 hectares (20 acres)

Site history
- Built: 1957
- In use: 2006 – present

Garrison information
- Occupants: Radar Flight (North)

Remote Radar Head Saxa Vord or RRH Saxa Vord (aka RAF Saxa Vord), is a Royal Air Force radar station located on the island of Unst, the most northern of the Shetland Islands in Scotland. As of July 2019 it is once more a fully operational radar station, after closure in 2006. The station's motto Praemoneo de Periculis ('Premonition of Peril') reflects its role. RAF Saxa Vord is further north than Saint Petersburg in Russia, and on the same latitude as Anchorage, Alaska. The station was named after Saxa Vord, which is the highest hill on Unst at 935 ft (285 m). It holds the unofficial British record for wind speed, which in 1992 was recorded at 197 mph (317 km/h) — just before the measuring equipment blew away.

== History ==
=== Early years ===
The island of Unst has played an important part in the defence of the UK since the outbreak of the Second World War. By 1945, there were two radar sites on the island; one on Saxa Vord hill, and the other at Skaw on the east coast. This latter is the older, being built in 1941, and was part of the Chain Home radar network as part of the defences of the RAF Sullom Voe flying boat base. Skaw closed in 1947, with Historic Environment Scotland describing its remains as "a remarkably well-preserved military complex... [with] an important part to play in the story of the defence of the United Kingdom during World War Two."

=== ROTOR era ===
As part of the post-war ROTOR radar network, Saxa Vord was selected as the site to host a new long-range radar as the northernmost point in a network of radars covering the entirety of the British Isles. As part of upgrades carried out for ROTOR, Saxa received new radars, the AMES Type 14 medium-range search radar, and associated AMES Type 13 height finders.

While these were being built, a dramatically more powerful system was entering prototype use, the AMES Type 80. The Type 80 had an effective range over 200 nautical miles (370 km; 230 mi), covering the entire Shetland Islands and a significant portion of the Norwegian Sea. The coverage was so vast that there was much less need to tie together multiple stations to provide a wide-area view, and the ROTOR system began to be progressively downgraded to individual Master Radar Stations. Installation of Saxa's Type 80 began in 1955, but was blown 50 yards (46 m) off its mountings by winds gusting to 177 miles per hour (285 km/h) in January 1956.

A new antenna design capable of handling winds of this magnitude was designed as the Mark II, and replaced the original later that year. No. 91 Signals Unit officially formed up at Saxa Vord on 27 September 1957, was declared operational on 5 October 1957, and in 1960 was visited by Queen Elizabeth II.

During this period the Type 14 was retained as a backup system until September 1964, whilst the Type 13 remained the primary height finder until 1978/79. The Type 80 was lost when it was blown away on 26 January 1961 and rebuilt inside a new radome. At the time, Saxa Vord consisted of three sites: the domestic site, the technical site (with the radars) and the married quarters called Setters Hill Estate (SHE). In the early days, the site was shared with the Royal Navy.

=== Linesman era ===
While the system was being built, serious concerns emerged over the introduction of the carcinotron, a new type of radar jammer that rendered the Type 80 almost useless. A new network using anti-jamming radars was introduced, the Linesman/Mediator system. In the new network, there was no point in Saxa attempting to remain operational against jammers, so it retained its Type 80 while other stations in the chain were upgraded with the new AMES Type 84 and AMES Type 85.

Linesman ran into significant delays, and entered service in limited form in 1973, years later than planned. By 1976, the Type 80 had been in operation for decades and was long overdue for a replacement for maintenance reasons alone. This led to the introduction of a AMES Type 96 (Marconi S649), which had two radar aerials mounted back-to-back, one operating at D band and the other at F and E bands (three transmitters/receivers in total). The decades-old Type 13 was replaced by the newer Plessey HF200 in the height-finder role.

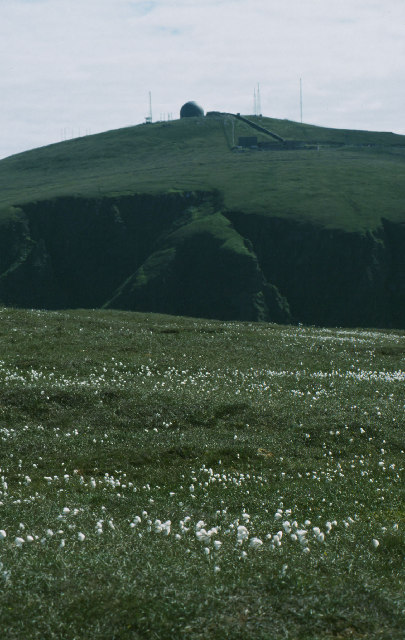
Wider view

In September 1976 a £10 million contract was given to Marconi and Plessey, for a project to be led by Marconi and built by Cementation.

In 1984 the station was renamed from No. 91 Signals Unit to Royal Air Force Saxa Vord. The signals unit badge was adopted by the station and it continued with the motto of Praemoneo de periculis (Latin for I give advanced warning about danger).

=== IUKADGE era ===
By the time Linesman was operational it was considered outdated; much of the equipment was based on decades-old designs, and built using components that were no longer available. Even before it was declared operational the decision had been made to replace it as soon as possible, A new system, IUKADGE, emerged during a several-year definition process. The system was implemented at Saxa Vord in 1993. This was part of NATO-wide upgrades and the funding for the new radar was provided from the NATO funding pool. This led to one of the six IUKADGE AMES Type 93s being earmarked for Saxa.

=== Downgrading to Remote Radar Head ===
While the upgrades were taking place, the Warsaw Pact was dissolving and the Soviet Union ceased to exist. The number of intruder flights collapsed and there was no sign they would be returning. From around 2000 until 2 April 2004, the station operated as Remote Radar Head (RRH) Saxa Vord, operated from parent station RAF Buchan. On 2 April 2004, RAF Saxa Vord was upgraded from a Remote Radar Head to a fully staffed station, taking over control of the radar defences in the area.

=== Closure ===
In 2005, the RAF announced that RRH Saxa Vord would close. The Type 93 radar was approaching obsolescence and was increasingly difficult to maintain. It was considered that with a reduced threat, funding would be diverted to other defence priorities.

RRH Saxa Vord closed in April 2006 with the site being placed on programme of care and maintenance and the radar being dismantled and used for spares in other Type 93 radars.

In April 2007, Saxa Vord's Domestic Site and the road up to the Mid Site were bought by Military Asset Management (MAM).

=== Reactivation as RRH ===
In September 2017, the Ministry of Defence confirmed that £10 million would be invested in Saxa Vord to reactivate the site as a Remote Radar Head. The move will provide better coverage of the airspace to the north of the UK, in response to increased Russian military activity. Work began in October 2017 to move a Lockheed Martin AN/TPS-77 L-band radar from RRH Staxton Wold in North Yorkshire to Saxa Vord.

During January 2018, Chief of the Air Staff, Air Chief Marshal Sir Stephen Hillier visited the site to inspect progress and the new radar reached initial operational capability. It was expected to reach full operational capability by the end of 2018.

As part of a major upgrade of RRH sites around the UK the MOD began a programme titled HYDRA in 2020 to install new communications buildings, radar towers and perimeter security.

Nobody will be permanently based at Saxa Vord, but regular visits will take place for maintenance purposes.

Some of the former base facilities have now been redeveloped into new roles. Planning permission for the SaxaVord Spaceport was initially denied by Historic Environment Scotland citing the damage to the surviving World War Two structures; however, in January 2022 the objection was withdrawn, stating "We recognise the benefits that this development will bring to the community in Unst". Construction and static fires have subsequently taken place, with an orbital launch expected sometime in 2025. The Saxa Vord distillery is also located on the site.

== See also ==
- Improved United Kingdom Air Defence Ground Environment – UK air defence radar system in the UK between the 1990s and 2000s
- Linesman/Mediator – UK air defence radar system in the UK between the 1960s and 1984
- List of Royal Air Force stations
- NATO Integrated Air Defense System
- Coastal fortifications in Scotland
- Armed forces in Scotland
- Military history of Scotland
