= 15 Field Squadron (Search) RE =

Squadron of the Royal Engineers

15 Squadron Royal Engineers
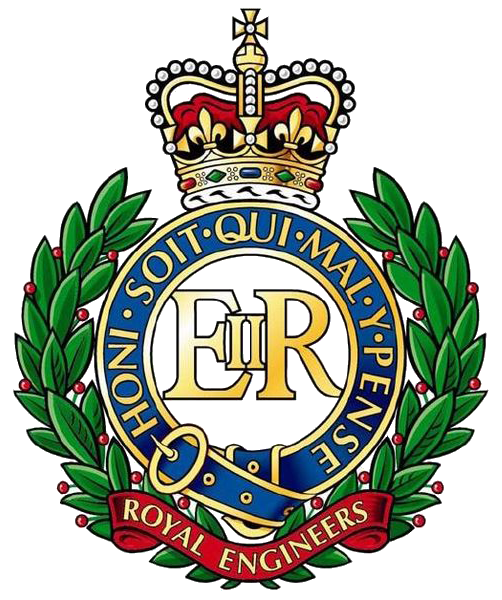
- Cap Badge of the Corps of Royal Engineers
- Active: 1825 – Present
- Country: United Kingdom
- Branch: British Army
- Part of: Royal Engineers
- Garrison/HQ: Carver Barracks, Wimbish
- Mottos: Ubique (Everywhere); Quo Fas et Gloria Ducunt (Where Duty and Glory lead)
- March: Wings (Quick march)
- Anniversaries: 27 April 1825

Insignia
- 15th Field Squadron Royal Engineer Badge

The 15 Field Squadron is a Field Squadron of the Royal Engineers a part of the British Army based in Wimbish.

== Summary ==
The current title of this unit is 15 Fd Sqn (EOD&S) and is located at Carver Barracks, Essex.

Its previous title was 15 Field Squadron (Search) and was located at Claro Barracks, Ripon before it was disbanded in 2013.

15 Field Squadron (Search) is a specialist counter-IED search squadron, part of 36 Engineer Regiment (Search), which itself comes under command of 29 EOD & Search Group, under control of 8 Force Engineer Brigade. Whilst it is co-located in Claro Barracks, Ripon, alongside 21 Engineer Regiment, its own Regimental Headquarters is 36 Engineer Regiment (Search) located in Maidstone, Kent.

The squadron is one of only five specialist search squadrons within the UK Armed Forces and is at the forefront of the fight to defeat improvised explosive device (IED) threat to forces deployed on operations. When not conducting search operations, it retains the capability to conduct the full range of specialist military engineer support.

Prior to its current role, the squadron was a field support squadron role supporting 3 (UK) Divisional Engineer Group. As a Field Support Squadron its role was focused on the management and delivery of specialist military engineer logistic support. In Dec -April 1991 it deployed to the first Gulf War under the Command of Major Philip Crook RE and played a key engineer support role in the retaking of Kuwait.

One of its most notable members, Lt Philip Neame, is the only holder of both the Victoria Cross and Olympic gold medal.

== Squadron badge ==
The squadron's unit badge is the Native American Indian Chieftain's head, with XV imprinted in the middle, denoting 15 Squadron. Whilst its actual origins are unknown, it is believed to represent its early work in Canada, where it was sent as part of the military construction force to build the Rideau Canal.

== Squadron history ==
The Royal Warrant of 27 April 1825 authorised the formation of a service company of the Royal Sappers and Miners for service at Portsmouth. After training at Chatham, the new company, the 15th, moved to Portsmouth.

Since its formation 15 Squadron has been amalgamated and disbanded many times, only to be reformed ready to take on a new roles. Its history is one that includes service in almost all of the United Kingdom's major conflicts over a period of history spanning nearly 190 years.

== Rideau Canal ==
On 26 March 1827 a Royal Warrant was issued that ordered the augmentation of two companies of 81 men each for works on the Rideau Canal. The officer commanding the 15th was Captain Victor. When the company was up to strength it sailed on the transport ship "Southworth" and landed in Canada on 1 June 1827.

The Rideau Canal was to run between the Ottawa River Kingston. It was to provide a link between Upper and Lower Canada that would secure it from attack by the United States, Lt Col John By RE was selected to carry out the project, and, by the spring of 1827, had completed his survey of the proposed route and had got it approved by the Earl of Dalhousier's land beside the Ottawa river. This settlement was named Bytown and the project headquarters was set up there. 15 Company lived in a barracks at Bytown on the present site of the Ottawa Parliament buildings. Sadly, during the construction of the canal, 21 members of the squadron perished. Lt Col By, the designer of the canal, is quoted as saying to the governor general of Canada:

"I have the honour to report that I find the greater part of Captain Victors’ [15th] Company such intelligent and well instructed men, that they are of the greatest use to me".

== Previous unit titles ==
15 Squadron has undergone many transformations during its service, this is a list of all known titles used in its history.

- Squadron reformed in Sep 2019 as 15 Field Squadron (Explosive Ordnance Disposal and Search)
- Squadron disbanded in 2013
- 15 Field Squadron (Search) (re-titled in 2011)
- 15 Field Support Squadron (re-titled in 2000)
- 15 Field Park Squadron (re-titled in 1992)
- 15 Field Support Squadron (re-titled in 1977)
- 15 Headquarters Squadron (re-titled in 1972)
- 15 Field Support Squadron (re-titled in 1968)
- 15 Field Park Squadron (re-titled in 1960)
- 15 Corps Field Park Squadron (re-titled in 1958)
- 15 Field Park Squadron (re-formed in 1950 from elements of 46 Field Park Squadron)
- Sent into suspended animation in 1949
- 15th Field Park Company (re-titled in 1926) (part of British Expeditionary Force 1940)
- 15 Fortress Company (re-titled in 1919)
- 15th Field Company (First World War part of 8th Division)
- 15th Fortress Company (re-titled in 1885) based in Gibraltar
- 15 Service Company, Royal Sappers and Miners (1825)

== Operational history ==
- First World War as part of 8th Division
- Second World War – D-Day,
- Operation TELIC 2
- Operation TELIC 3
- Operation TELIC 7
- Operation HERRICK 12 15 Field Support Squadron was the first Royal Engineer squadron to deploy to Afghanistan with the new Talisman counter-IED system
- Operation Olympics 2012

=== First World War ===
15th Field Company, part of 8th Division, commanded by Captain PK Betty. Served on the Somme from July to November 1916. 15th Field Company participated in the Battle of Asine (27 May to 2 June 1918), where it suffered heavy casualties. Took part in the attack on Neuve Chapelle (March, 1915) supporting 24th Brigade.

List of Battles which 15 Squadron RE participated in:

1914

- 18 Dec, Neuve Chapelle (Moated Grange Attack)

1915

- 10–13 Mar, Battle of Neuve Chapelle
- 9 May, Battle of Aubers Ridge and Attack at Fromelles
- 25 Sep, Bois Grenier

1916

- Battle of the Somme

1 Jul, Battle of Albert
23–30 Oct, Attack on Le Transloy

1917

- 4 Mar, Bouchavesnes
- 14 Mar–5 Apr, German retreat to the Hindenburg Line
- Battle of Passchendaele (also known as the Third Battle of Ypres)

31 Jul–1 Aug, Battle of Pilckem Ridge
31 Jul, Attack on Westhock
16–18 Aug, Battle of Langenmarch
2 Dec, Assault of Southern Hedoult

1918

- Second Battle of the Somme

23 Mar, Battle of St Quentin
24–25 Mar, Actions at the Somme Crossing
26–27 Mar, Battle of Rosieres
24–25 Apr, Villers Bretonneux
27 May–6 Jun, Battle of Aisne
26–30 Aug, Battle of the Scarpe
17 Oct, Capture of Douai

=== Second World War ===
Participated in D-Day as part of 3rd British Division, landing on Sword Beach, commanded by Major HC Dykes.

List of Battles which 15 Squadron RE participated in:

1940

- 26–28 May, Ypres – Comines Canal

1944

- 6 Jun, Normandy Landings
- 4–18 Jul, Caen
- 18–23 Jul, Bourguebus Ridge
- 30 Jul–9 Aug, Mount Pincon
- 17–27 Sep, The Nederriyn

1945

- 8 Feb–10 Mar, The Rhineland
- 23 Mar–1 Apr, The Rhine

== Ripon ==
Both the Corps of Royal Engineers and 15 Squadron have a long relationship with the city of Ripon, North Yorkshire. 15 Squadron first arrived in the city in December 1958 following its deployment to Christmas Island supporting nuclear-weapons testing that was conducted on the Islands. It arrived as part of the re-location of 38 Corps Engineer Regiment (which included 48 and 63 Field Squadrons, and later 12 Squadron). In 1964 the squadron was tasked with levelling of the ground for a new cemetery in Ripon. In 1991 the Sqn deployed to the Gulf War as part of the Coalition to retake Kuwait, it was commanded by Major Philip Crook RE.

== Notable members of the Squadron ==
Philip Neame VC
The squadron's most famous member who on 18 December 1914 won the Victoria Cross during the First World War as lieutenant in 15th Field Company. He later went on to reach the rank of lieutenant general in the British Army and is the only Victoria Cross recipient to ever win an Olympic Gold medal, which he achieved in the 1924 Olympic Games.

The citation for his Victoria Cross said:

"For conspicuous bravery on the 19th December 1914 near Neuve Chapelle, when notwithstanding the very heavy rifle fire and bomb throwing by the enemy, he succeeded in holding them back and rescuing all the wounded men whom it was possible to move"

He was decorated with the VC by HM King George V at Windsor Castle on 19 July 1915.

In 2012, the squadron deployed a troop to provide personnel as a venue security force for the 2012 London Olympic Games. In honour of Philip Neame's achievement, this troop was named Neame Troop and was commanded by a Royal Engineer lieutenant.

== Honours and awards ==
The following is a list of honours and awards earned by members of the squadron.

Victoria Cross

Lt P Neame VC (19 Dec 1914)

Distinguished Service Order

Maj PK Betty DSO

Military Cross

Capt RC McNeille MC
Maj CV Strong MC
Maj F Lambert MC
A/Maj HC Hillman MC

Military Medal

Sgt Palmer Aug (1916)
Sgt Dare Aug (1916)
Sgt Parks Aug (1916)

Distinguished Conduct Medal

Spr HG Catlin (10 Mar 1915)
Sgt EN Davey (1 Jan 1918)
Spr T Edwards (1 Apr 1918)
Sgt PJ Frankum (22 Oct 1917)
Sgt W Hales (3 Jun 1918)
LCpl J Jennings (1 Apr 1915)
Spr T Jones (1 Apr 1915)
Sgt (A/CSM) T O’Brien (3 Oct 1918)
LCpl OV Poulton (1 Apr 1915)
Sgt (A/CSM) HW Richardson (4 Jun 1917)
Spr G Smith (23 Sep 1915), (Bar to DCM as a Cpl) 22 Sep 1916
