= Baltasound =

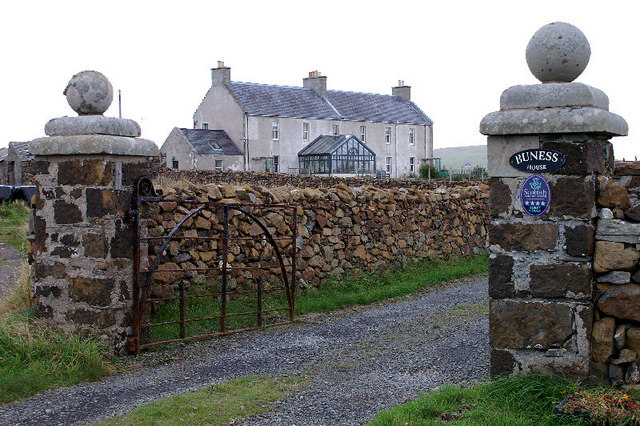
- At the main gate of Buness, Baltasound

- Location within Shetland
- OS grid reference: HP620089
- Civil parish: Unst
- Council area: Shetland
- Lieutenancy area: Shetland
- Country: Scotland
- Sovereign state: United Kingdom
- Post town: SHETLAND
- Postcode district: ZE2
- Dialling code: 01957
- Police: Scotland
- Fire: Scottish
- Ambulance: Scottish
- UK Parliament: Orkney and Shetland
- Scottish Parliament: Shetland

Baltasound (Shaetlan pronunciation: [ˈbaɫtisund] BAHL-tee-soond) is the largest settlement on the island of Unst in Shetland, Scotland. Unst is the most northerly inhabited island in the United Kingdom. The village lies halfway along the island's east coast on a sheltered bay called Balta Sound.

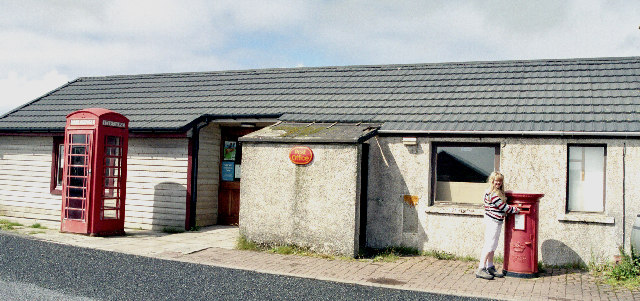
Baltasound Post Office, the most northerly in the UK

Baltasound was formerly the most important herring port in Shetland. In 1902 its catch exceeded that of the Shetland capital Lerwick. The herring trade declined rapidly after 1905 but the physical remains of the herring boom remained long after.

Baltasound was the home of the noted Victorian botanist Thomas Edmondston, who was born at Buness House where his uncle, also called Thomas, was the laird. A memorial stone erected outside the house by the elder Thomas Edmondston commemorates scientific studies undertaken there by the French physicist Jean-Baptiste Biot.

James Ingram (1776-1879)) was a prominent and influential minister in the parishes of Fetlar and Unst.

Sinclair Ferguson theologian and academic, was the minister of St. John's, Baltasound for 10 years, starting in 1971.

Baltasound can also lay claim to the most northerly "wood" in the British Isles, although it is not very substantial.

== Amenities ==
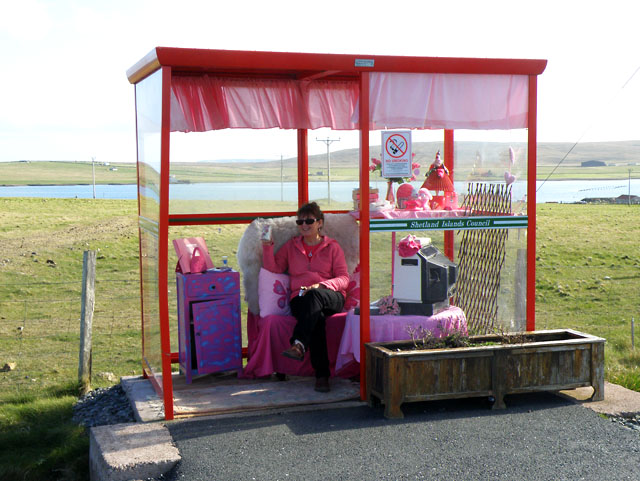
Bobby's Bus Shelter

Map of Unst, northernmost of the North Isles of Shetland

Many of Baltasound's current amenities hold the record for the most northerly in the UK:

- Airport - Unst/Baltasound Airport - Airport code UNT, runway length 2,099 feet (640 m)., currently only used by emergency services.
- Leisure centre
- School - Baltasound Junior High School
- Hotel - The Baltasound Hotel
- Post office - Baltasound Post Office is the most northerly post office in the United Kingdom. For many years, this record was held by the post office at Haroldswick until it closed down in 1999.
- The Unst Bus Shelter, known locally as "Bobby's Bus Shelter", is a famous bus shelter and bus stop near the village. It is maintained by the Shetland Islands Council. The bus stop is also the northernmost in the UK.

A 2 foot 6 inch gauge railway was built from the Chromite quarries at Hagdale to Baltasound in 1907 to boost the Chromate industry on the island. Although the railway did not operate a passenger service, it helped the village economically and financially. Like other narrow gauge railways in the Shetland Islands, it did not survive.

== Climate ==
Baltasound is home to the most northerly Met Office weather station in the United Kingdom. Similar to fellow Shetland station Lerwick, Baltasound experiences a cool oceanic climate that borders a subpolar climate (Köppen: Cfb and Cfc, respectively), with winters that are mild for the latitude, and short, cool summers. Precipitation is abundant and occurs year-round.

Baltasound holds the record for the highest temperature recorded in the Shetland Islands: 25.0 °C (77.0 °F) on 2 July 1958. It also possibly holds the record for the lowest Shetland temperature: −11.9 °C (10.6 °F) on 5 February 2001.

During the summer solstice, Baltasound experiences what is known as civil polar day, where the sun sets in the evening and rises the next morning, but between these times it does not get completely dark. During the winter solstice the sun also fails to reach 6° above the horizon, classified as solar twilight.

Climate data for Baltasound WMO ID: 03002; coordinates 60°44′54″N 0°51′20″W; elevation: 15 m (49 ft); 1991–2020 normals, extremes 1914–present
Month	Jan	Feb	Mar	Apr	May	Jun	Jul	Aug	Sep	Oct	Nov	Dec	Year
Record high °C (°F)	11.2 (52.2)	12.8 (55.0)	15.0 (59.0)	20.0 (68.0)	22.3 (72.1)	23.2 (73.8)	25.0 (77.0)	24.4 (75.9)	22.1 (71.8)	16.9 (62.4)	13.6 (56.5)	13.3 (55.9)	25.0 (77.0)
Mean daily maximum °C (°F)	6.6 (43.9)	6.3 (43.3)	7.4 (45.3)	9.2 (48.6)	11.2 (52.2)	13.3 (55.9)	15.1 (59.2)	15.4 (59.7)	13.6 (56.5)	10.9 (51.6)	8.5 (47.3)	7.0 (44.6)	10.4 (50.7)
Daily mean °C (°F)	4.4 (39.9)	4.0 (39.2)	4.9 (40.8)	6.6 (43.9)	8.4 (47.1)	10.8 (51.4)	12.7 (54.9)	13.0 (55.4)	11.4 (52.5)	8.8 (47.8)	6.4 (43.5)	4.7 (40.5)	8.0 (46.4)
Mean daily minimum °C (°F)	2.2 (36.0)	1.7 (35.1)	2.4 (36.3)	3.9 (39.0)	5.6 (42.1)	8.3 (46.9)	10.2 (50.4)	10.5 (50.9)	9.1 (48.4)	6.6 (43.9)	4.2 (39.6)	2.4 (36.3)	5.6 (42.1)
Record low °C (°F)	−10.4 (13.3)	−11.9 (10.6)	−8.9 (16.0)	−6.7 (19.9)	−2.8 (27.0)	0.0 (32.0)	1.1 (34.0)	0.6 (33.1)	−0.8 (30.6)	−3.3 (26.1)	−6.7 (19.9)	−10.8 (12.6)	−11.9 (10.6)
Average precipitation mm (inches)	127.8 (5.03)	100.4 (3.95)	98.3 (3.87)	61.4 (2.42)	53.5 (2.11)	55.0 (2.17)	65.0 (2.56)	83.4 (3.28)	92.7 (3.65)	116.2 (4.57)	124.7 (4.91)	125.3 (4.93)	1,103.5 (43.44)
Average precipitation days (≥ 1.0 mm)	21.7	19.2	19.5	14.4	12.8	11.2	11.6	13.6	15.7	20.1	21.2	21.9	202.9
Source 1: Met Office
Source 2: Starlings Roost Weather
