= Haroldswick =

Coordinates: 60.788°N 0.834°W

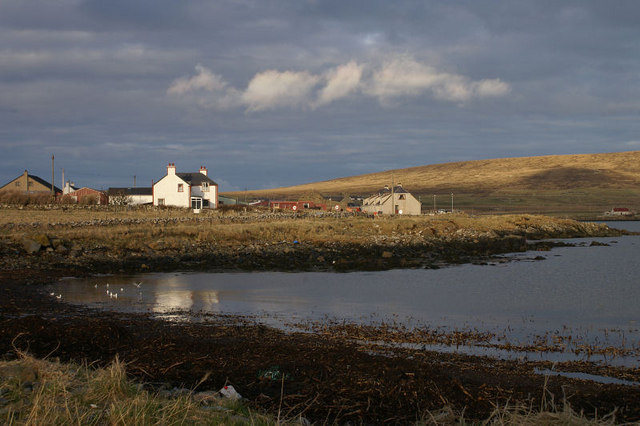
- At Haroldswick beach, the white building is Bordanoost and the grey buildings just right of centre are the houses of Beach Road.

- Location within Shetland
- OS grid reference: HP634121
- Civil parish: Unst
- Council area: Shetland
- Lieutenancy area: Shetland
- Country: Scotland
- Sovereign state: United Kingdom
- Post town: SHETLAND
- Postcode district: ZE2
- Dialling code: 01595
- Police: Scotland
- Fire: Scottish
- Ambulance: Scottish
- UK Parliament: Orkney and Shetland
- Scottish Parliament: Shetland

Haroldswick or Harold's Wick (Shaetlan pronunciation: [ˈharəɫdswik] HA-rəlds-week; Old Norse: Haraldsvík, 'Harald's bay'), is on Unst, Shetland Islands, Scotland, and is one of the most northerly settlements in the British Isles.

== History ==
The wick takes its name from the Viking King Harald I Fairhair, and is reputed to be the first landing point for the Vikings in the Shetland Islands. A Viking grave, attributed to Harold, has been found on the nearby Setter's Hill, overlooking the landing point.

== Geography ==
It sits at the end of a small bay in a crescent moon shape with a hill on either side, with steep cliffs and rough waters with good mackerel fishing grounds underneath. The beach is rocky until it comes to an old ruin of a pier, then it has huge boulders blocking traveller's way. Lining the beach are little cottages with their only barrier against the winds from the sea being a small wall on the other side of the road. A small maritime museum dedicated to the traditional small boats of Shetland, the Unst Boat Haven, is located at the head of the bay and is open to visitors from May to September. The beach is frequently populated with grey seals and grey herons. The depth is shallow for about 6 metres, then deepens considerably.

== Location ==
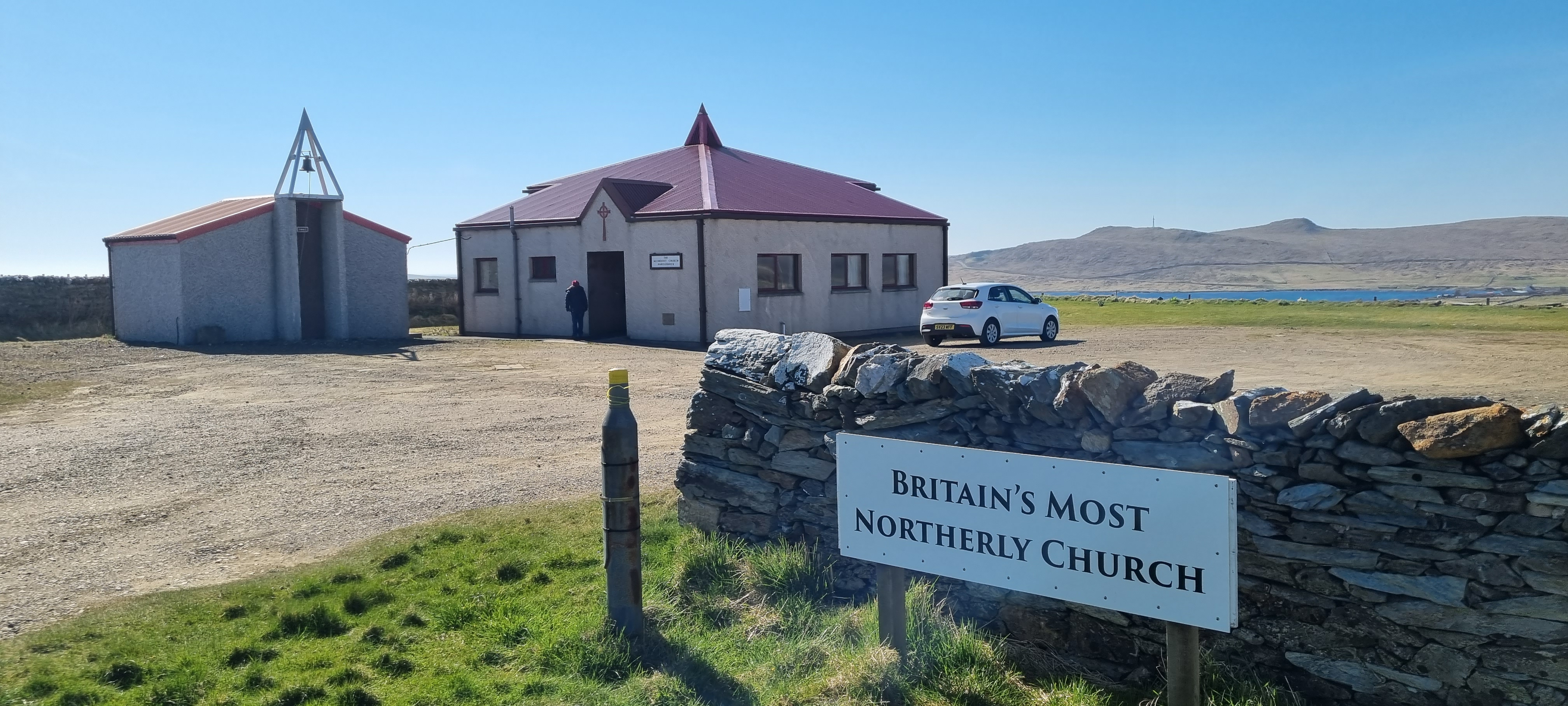
Haroldswick Church seen in 2023

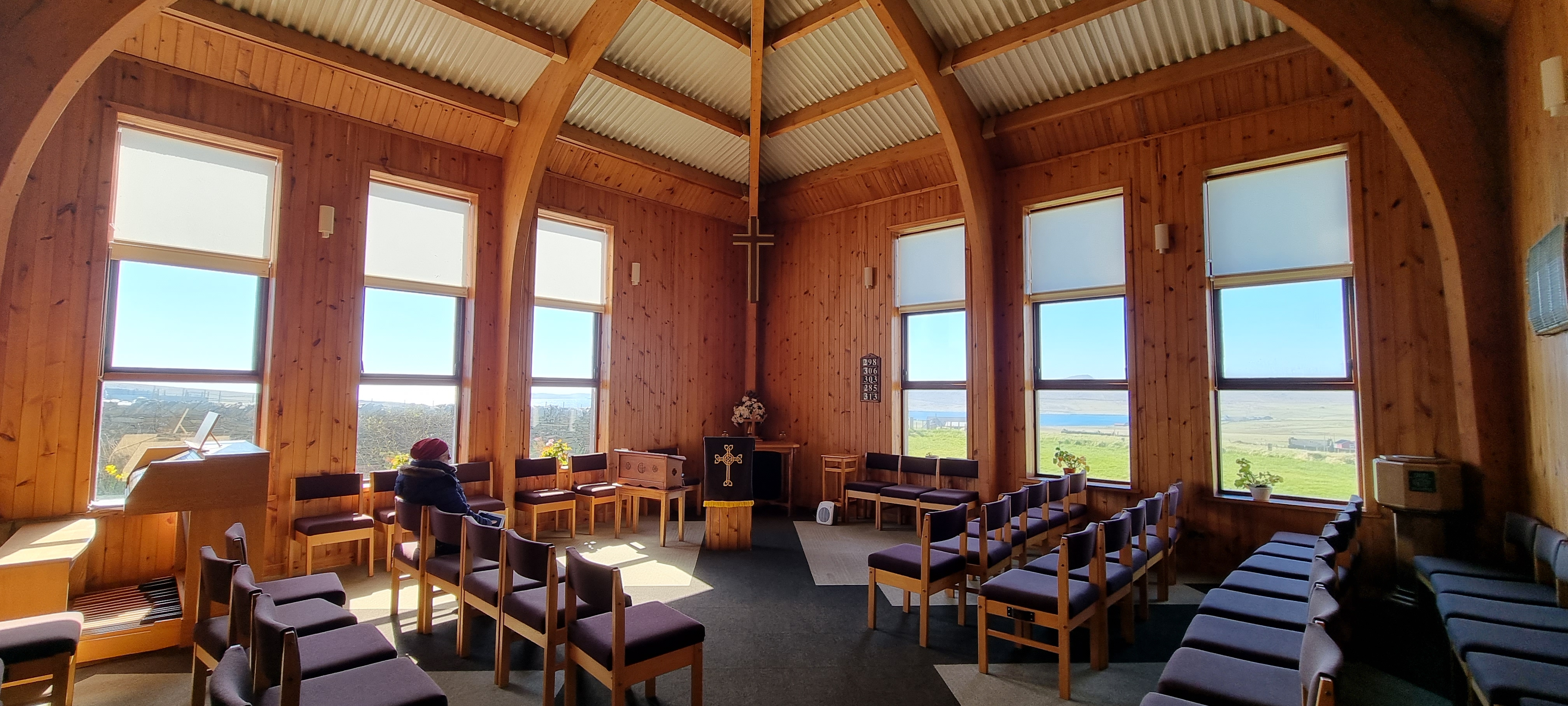
Church interior

The bay is located some 615 km (382 mi) north of the closest mainland UK city, Inverness, in Scotland's Highland region and 1,310 km (810 mi) from London. Even Lerwick, the Shetland's capital and only town, is some 96 km (60 mi) to the south. However, Haroldswick's claim to be the northernmost settlement in the UK is surpassed by the tiny hamlet of Norwick-Skaw, situated 8 km (5.0 mi) to the north.

The Methodist Church at Haroldswick is the northernmost church in Britain.

For many years, Haroldswick Post Office was the most northerly in the UK and visitors could get a special postmark. Since the office's closure in 1999, this record is now held by the post office in Baltasound, also on Unst.
