= Witchcraft in Orkney =

Overview of witch persecution in Orkney, Scotland

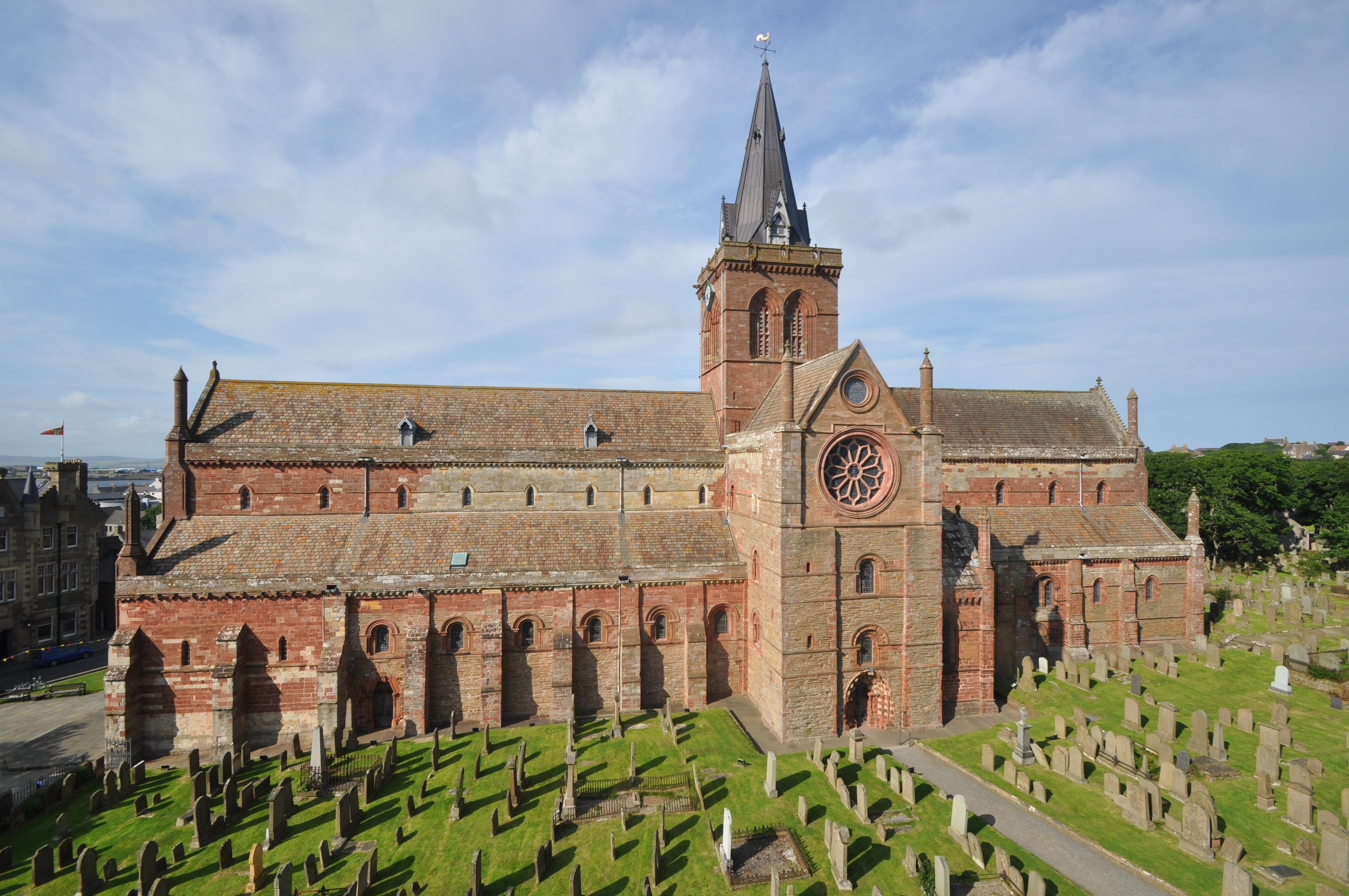
Most witch trials in Orkney were held in St Magnus Cathedral, Kirkwall

Witchcraft in Orkney possibly has its roots in the settlement of Norsemen on the archipelago from the eighth century onwards. Until the early modern period magical powers were accepted as part of the general lifestyle, but witch-hunts began on the mainland of Scotland in about 1550, and the Scottish Witchcraft Act of 1563 made witchcraft or consultation with witches a crime punishable by death. One of the first Orcadians tried and executed for witchcraft was Allison Balfour, in 1594. Balfour, her elderly husband and two young children, were subjected to severe torture for two days to elicit a confession from her.

Trials were generally held in St Magnus Cathedral where the accused were also incarcerated while being interrogated. Once convicted, witches were taken to Gallow Ha to be executed by strangulation and then their bodies were burned. Early laws also allowed the seizure of any property or belongings of those guilty of any crimes associated with witchcraft; this was manipulated to suit whatever purpose the ruling Earls such as Patrick Stewart, 2nd Earl of Orkney had in mind, and left much of the island's population destitute. These laws were overturned in 1611 but were replaced by Scottish law, causing a shift from the exploitation by the Earls to the administration of justice by the Bishop's court of James Law, a fervent minister from West Lothian. The reforms instituted by the restoration of the Bishops had a significant impact but failed to introduce any neutrality into the proceedings against those accused of witchcraft during the most intensive period of witch-hunting on the island from 1615 until 1645.

The new court regime produced varying results regarding punishments passed down: the first trial held on 7 June 1615 was against two women from Westray, both were deemed guilty but one was sentenced to be banished after a severe public flogging while the other was tied to a stake, strangled and burned. Charges in cases varied but the slightest misdemeanour could lead to charges of witchcraft and devilry being brought and upheld. If confessions of associations with the Devil were not forthcoming, convictions were obtained on the basis of consorting with fairies. In 1616 Elspeth Reoch was found guilty and executed after she admitted having sexual intercourse with a fairy man.

Mirroring the time span of witch persecution on the mainland of Scotland, the trials in Orkney drew to an end in 1708; most took place prior to 1650. Sixty-eight people had been accused, the majority – around ninety percent – were women, a higher ratio than that recorded in the rest of the country.

== Background ==
The islanders of Orkney had a long tradition of belief in broadly construed forms of witchcraft, sorcery, and supernatural creatures, possibly stretching back to the arrival of the first Norse settlers. The date the Norse first began to settle Orkney is not certainly known, although it likely occurred prior to the first written records of their appearance in north Britain, which date to the late eighth century. Magical powers were accepted as part of the general lifestyle and were not questioned. Superstitious island farmers attributed poor harvests or the loss of their stock to the malevolence of witches. Gradually attitudes began to change; theologians suggested that those with mystical powers were devil worshippers and it was heresy. Components of local folk tales were associated with witches by ministers who suggested the alleged witches were working with fairies and other supernatural creatures. It was common for inquisitors to transcribe the word devil or demon in place of any appellation for a fairy an alleged witch may have used in their statement.

In Scotland witch-hunts began around 1550; the parliament of Mary, Queen of Scots passed the Scottish Witchcraft Act in 1563 making witchcraft convictions a capital punishment. Although the Orkney archipelago was officially under Norwegian law until 1611, at which time it was abolished by an act of the Privy Council of Scotland, it had been held by Scotland from 1468 under the rule of Scottish earls. Patrick Stewart, 2nd Earl of Orkney, known as Black Patie, had control of the islands in 1594 at the time of the initial witch trials but later trials were overseen by James Law who took on the role of sheriff after he had been appointed Bishop of Orkney by King James. (Note: In the areas of northern Orkney outside of Law's bishopric and all of Shetland, Sir James Stewart of Killeith, 4th Lord Ochiltree, was Lord Chamberlain and sheriff from 1613.) In contrast to the mainland where the Privy Council oversaw trials, there are no records of it having any involvement on Orkney where, from 1615, the Procurator Fiscal instigated hearings in the Sheriff Court or they were heard by the church elders. The Witchcraft Act not only allowed the execution of witches but also those who sought advice from them. Patie treated the islanders with contempt and tended to impose extremely heavy penalties on the advice seekers. When the Privy Council questioned him about it in 1609, he replied that without the severe penalties the islanders "wald all have becommit witches and warlockis for the people ar naturally inclynit thairto". King James also considered Orkney as one of the places where sorcery and magic were widespread, mentioning it in his book Daemonologie. Early to mid-19th century sailors held a similar conviction concerning the archipelago: Walter Traill Dennison, a folklorist and native of Sanday, born in 1825, had been taken on an excursion to Leith as a child. An elderly sailor sat the boy on his lap while recounting him a tale; when he discovered Traill Dennison was a visitor from Orkney, he recoiled from him in fear crying "O, my lad, you hail from that lubber land where so many cursed witches dwell."

== Early trials ==
Only sparse information is available on witch trials in Orkney prior to 1612, yet the first of two connected witchcraft trials associated with Orkney, held in 1594 and 1596, (Note: The associated 1596 trial was the case heard against Patie's brother, John Stewart, Earl of Carrick. Held at the courts in Edinburgh, he was found not guilty of witchcraft and conspiracy to murder Patie.) has been described by the academic historian Julian Goodare as "one of Scotland's most frequently-cited witchcraft cases." Admissions of guilt were an integral part of witchcraft trials in Scotland and torture was often used until the practice was discontinued in 1708. Allison Balfour, who lived in an area of Stenness known as Ireland, (Note: This has led to some confusion with Balfour being mistakenly listed as Irish.) had been asked for advice on how best to cast a spell on Patie by his brothers and friends who were plotting to kill him. Together with her aged husband, son and seven-year-old daughter, Balfour was subjected to extensive torture for forty-eight hours. She finally confessed but was found guilty of conspiring to murder by the use of witchcraft and was sentenced to be strangled and burned. On 16 December 1594 she was executed despite having retracted her confession.

The majority of trials were held in St Magnus Cathedral. Prisoners may also have been held captive in the cathedral; a roofed cell-like area, often referred to as Marwick's-hole, is set between the side wall and the south transept chapel. Above the north and south chapels, on the second floor, are small rooms that may have been utilised as cells too. Convicted witches were executed on Gallow Ha, an area in Kirkwall located at the top of a street now called Clay Loan. (Note: Various names for Gallow Ha' are given: Heding Hill is used by Pitcairn; Marwick and Towrie have Heiding Hill yet Marwick uses only the term Gallow Hill in another of his publications; and Willumsen writes Hedding Hill.)

Early Norwegian law dating back to the 11th century stipulated that anyone declared guilty of sorcery or associated crimes would forfeit all their possessions; records in Orkney for the period around 1602–04 detail land seized due to crimes of witchcraft. Like his father before him Patie had no compunction about seizing land from lowly islanders; the law was manipulated to suit his own desires leaving much of the population destitute. Court papers frequently show the status of an accused islander as a vagabond, some having been forced into that lifestyle after being banished from their local community. Convictions and fines utilising the Lawburrows Act were often imposed by Patie but were rarely listed as such.

The Rentals of the Ancient Earldom and Bishoprick of Orkney for 1595 indicate that two women, Jonet of Cara from South Ronaldsay – whose possessions had been seized by Patie – and another who is simply listed as "Alisoun Margaret's daughter" from Thurvoe were burned for witchcraft in or around 1595. The same document records Anne Marsetter of Halkland in Rendall, Elspet Marsetter of Wosbuster in South Sandwick and Robert Ness from the Ireland area of Stenness as being witches.

== Later trials ==
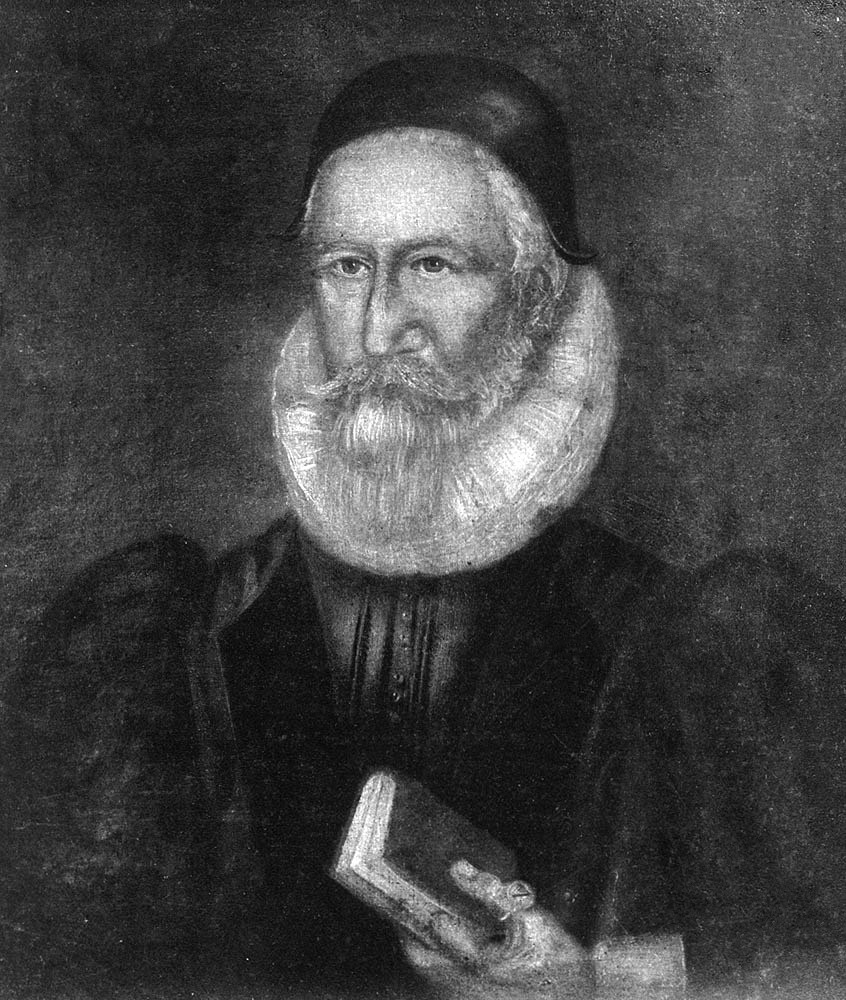
The court reforms instigated by James Law, the Bishop of Orkney, impacted significantly on the witch trials in Orkney.

The early years of the 17th century were a period of political turmoil. James Law, a fervent minister from Kirkliston in West Lothian, was appointed Bishop of Orkney by King James in 1605. Eventually subjugated by Bishop Law, Black Patie was incarcerated and then executed after he enraged King James; Patie's illegitimate son, Robert, was also executed after he was forced to surrender following a siege at Kirkwall Castle in 1614. In addition, the old Norse Laws were officially replaced by the laws of Scotland in 1611 and, according to the scholar Robert Barclay, while "the earl's court had manipulated the law, the bishop's court now administered justice". The most intensive period during which the witches were persecuted on Orkney was from 1615 until 1645. The historian Liv Helene Willumsen considers the court reforms instigated by Bishop Law around 1614 and the restoration of the bishops impacted significantly on the witch trials, but failed to improve the neutrality of the proceedings.

On 7 June 1615 the new court regime saw the first instance of charges being levelled for "the abohminable and divelishe cryme of witchcraft". The two accused women, Jonet Drever and Katherene Bigland, both from Westray, were declared guilty at their joint trial held in Kirkwall but with differing sentences. Drever confessed to having 26 years earlier conversed with fairies, that she left a child in the care of the fairy folk who she called "our good neighbours and in having carnal dealings with her." Orcadian historian Ernest Marwick considered part of the phrasing used in the accusations made against Bigland to be ambiguous; it could be interpreted as Bigland acting as lookout while a gathering of witches took place in the churchyard. Instead he read the meaning to be she was "accused of raising a procession of the dead". (Note: Marwick details the phrase in the court records as reading: "on the style of the kirk yard of the Cross Kirk of Westray with drawn knives in her hand while Marioun Tailyeour, her mother, and others who were in her company, came out of the said kirk, for most part of a night".) She had also washed her master with salt water after taking him down to the shoreline as it was thought to have medicinal properties; his illness was allegedly caused by Bigland, who then cured him by inflicting the sickness on his servant but she then transferred it back to the master again. The punishment ordered for Drever was that she be severely flogged in public the following afternoon then banished whereas Bigland was bound to a stake, strangled and burned.

The type of accusation made against Bigland, the curing or being responsible for the illness of livestock or people, was the most common charge against alleged witches until 1650. During that period fourteen islanders were accused of causing or being responsible for the death of a person, and thirteen for bringing about the death of an animal. Charges were brought if the accused was known to have disliked someone who died or if they had been heard muttering threats against others. Katherine Craigie of Rousay was tried twice, first in 1640 and again in 1643; (Note: At her second trial on 12 July 1643 Craigie was found guilty of witchcraft and sentenced to be strangled and burned.) among her alleged misdeeds was that she had accurately predicted a man she had a dispute with would die within a year. When the claim was causing the death of animals, an alleged witch being seen near the barns or pastures where livestock were accommodated provided adequate grounds for prosecution.

Generally even tentative evidence indicating any association with the Devil or the merest connection to curing disease was "devilrie and witchcraft." At the trial of Jonet Rendall in 1629 the charges against her alleged she received her healing powers from the Devil. He had a grey beard, was dressed in white with a head of the same colour yet a few years later at the trial against Marion Richart from Sanday in 1633, the Devil she was meeting with had the "likeness of a black man". Rendall and Richart were both convicted and sentenced to be strangled and burned.

If the evidence did not show connections to the Devil, the courts would convict on tales of involvement with fairies. At her trial in 1616 Elspeth Reoch admitted to having several rendezvous with the Devil who had assumed the form of a fairy; she said one of the meetings she had with the Devil occurred on Halloween. Her confession stated that when she was twelve years old she had met two men near a loch; after she produced an illegitimate child, one of the men appeared again at her bedside. She admitted that she had sexual intercourse with the "Farie man". At one of the meetings she had with him, he informed her that "Orkney was Priestgone, as there were too many ministers in it." (Note: Priestgone is defined by Marwick as "Priest ridden".) Reoch was found guilty and executed.

== Decline ==
Witch trials continued on Orkney until 1708, a similar time span to that on the mainland of Scotland, although the majority of Orcadian trials took place prior to 1650, when witch-hunting on the archipelago virtually came to an end. Accusations were made against sixty-eight people. (Note: The Survey of Scottish Witchcraft Database compiled by the University of Edinburgh lists 72 Orkney cases but has several duplicated under different names.) The highest number of cases heard in one year was during 1643 when twenty-four individuals were accused of witchcraft or using charms. Around ninety percent of the witchcraft allegations in Orkney were brought against women, a higher proportion than seen on the mainland. Any accusations levelled against men were all related to cases dealing with women.
