= Bishop's Palace, Kirkwall =

Coordinates: 58°58′51″N 2°57′35″W

Bishop's Palace
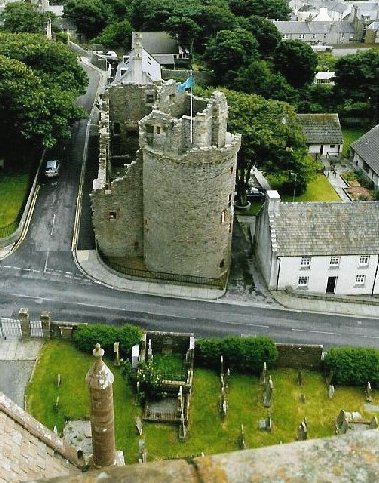
- Bishop's Palace, seen from St Magnus Cathedral tower

- Location within Orkney Islands

General information
- Status: in ruins
- Type: palace
- Architectural style: Romanesque, Gothic
- Location: Kirkwall, Scotland
- Owner: Historic Environment Scotland

The Bishop's Palace, Kirkwall is a 12th-century palace built at the same time as the adjacent St Magnus Cathedral in the centre of Kirkwall, Orkney, Scotland. It housed the cathedral's first bishop, William the Old of the Norwegian Catholic Church who took his authority from the Archbishop of Nidaros (Trondheim). The ruined structure now looks like a small castle.

== History ==
Originally, it is thought to have been like a typical Royal Norwegian palace, with a large rectangular hall above store rooms and a tower house as the Bishop's private residence. King Haakon IV of Norway, overwintering after the Battle of Largs, died here in 1263, marking the end of Norse rule over the Outer Hebrides. The neglected palace had fallen into ruins by 1320.

In 1468, Orkney and Shetland were pledged by Christian I of Denmark and Norway for the payment of the dowry of his daughter Margaret, betrothed to James III of Scotland, and as the money has never since been paid, their connection with the crown of Scotland has been perpetual. In 1526, the palace came briefly into the possession of William, Lord Sinclair, before he was ordered to return it to the Bishop of Orkney. When King James V of Scotland visited Kirkwall in 1540, he garrisoned his troops in the palace and in Kirkwall Castle. Soon afterwards, extensive restoration was begun by Bishop Robert Reid, the last of Orkney's medieval bishops, who also founded the University of Edinburgh. Reid added a round tower, the Moosie Toor.

Mary I of England sent a fleet to Scotland in 1557, commanded by William Woodhouse and John Clere. Clere's troops attacked the cathedral on 12 August. The force was overpowered on the next day while attempting to capture the Bishop's Palace. Many of the retreating English, including Clere, drowned trying to reach their ships.

Ownership passed to Robert Stewart, 1st Earl of Orkney, in 1568. His 1593 will mentions eight pieces of old tapestry which probably furnished the palace. His son, Patrick Stewart, 2nd Earl of Orkney, planned to incorporate the building into his Earl's Palace, Kirkwall, but debts forced him to return it to Bishop James Law. Earl Patrick's son Robert seized both palaces in 1614, and a siege followed, though it is not known if this caused damage to the structures, both of which are now ruins.

== Today ==
The palace is open to the public. It is administered by Historic Environment Scotland as a scheduled monument.

The palace and the nearby Earl's Palace were closed to the public from October 2023 through March 2024, during which time high level masonry inspections were being carried out as part of the building's conservation.
