= Earl's Palace =

Earl's Palace may refer to the following buildings in Orkney, Scotland:

- Earl's Palace, Birsay
- Earl's Palace, Kirkwall
