= List of listed buildings in Tingwall, Shetland Islands =

This is a list of listed buildings in the parish of Tingwall in the Shetland Islands, Scotland.

== List ==
Name	Location	Date Listed	Grid Ref. (Note: Sometimes known as OSGB36, the grid reference (where provided) is based on the British national grid reference system used by the Ordnance Survey. • "Guide to National Grid". Ordnance Survey. • "Get-a-map". Ordnance Survey.)	Geo-coordinates	Notes	LB Number (Note: Historic Environment Scotland assign a unique alphanumeric identifier to each designated site in Scotland, for listed buildings this always begins with "LB", for example "LB12345".)	Image
Lax Firth, Laxfirth House, Including Walled Garden And Gatepiers				60°12′21″N 1°12′53″W	Category C(S)	47293	Upload Photo
Scalloway, Main Street, Scalloway Meat Company				60°08′14″N 1°16′35″W	Category C(S)	47303	Upload another image
Sound, John Clunies Ross's House, Including Bods, Cottages, Outbuildings, Walls And Slip				60°14′03″N 1°18′35″W	Category B	47305	Upload Photo
Whiteness, St Ola's Kirk, Including Graveyard Wall				60°12′34″N 1°17′28″W	Category C(S)	18560	Upload Photo
Binna Ness, Binna Ness House (Jackville), Including Outbuilding, Walled Garden, And Wall				60°10′15″N 1°19′14″W	Category B	18561	Upload Photo
East Burra, Houss, Haa Of Houss, Including Outbuilding				60°03′47″N 1°19′33″W	Category C(S)	47291	Upload Photo
Scalloway, Chapel Lane And Houl Road, Scalloway Methodist Church, Including Walls, Railings, And Gatepiers				60°08′17″N 1°16′41″W	Category C(S)	47297	Upload Photo
Veensgarth, Veensgarth House, Including Garden Wall And Outbuilding				60°10′49″N 1°13′47″W	Category C(S)	47311	Upload Photo
Scalloway, Main Street, Anderson's Buildings: Westmost				60°08′14″N 1°16′34″W	Category C(S)	43272	Upload Photo
Scalloway, Main Street, Scalloway Church (Church Of Scotland), Including Boundary Walls And Gatepiers				60°08′16″N 1°16′47″W	Category B	18556	Upload another image See more images
Scalloway, Main Street, An-Teallach				60°08′14″N 1°16′54″W	Category C(S)	47299	Upload Photo
Scalloway, Main Street, Anderson's Buildings: Eastmost (Post Office)				60°08′14″N 1°16′31″W	Category C(S)	43269	Upload Photo
Scalloway, Main Street, Bank Building				60°08′14″N 1°16′35″W	Category C(S)	43273	Upload Photo
Tingwall, St Magnus's Kirk, Mitchell's Of Westshore Burial Aisle				60°10′33″N 1°14′47″W	Category B	18555	Upload another image
Scalloway, New Street, Old Haa Of Scalloway, Including Boundary Walls And Steps				60°08′13″N 1°16′30″W	Category A	18558	Upload Photo
Weisdale, South Setter House				60°16′27″N 1°17′01″W	Category C(S)	18563	Upload Photo
Scalloway, Main Street, St Clair Court				60°08′14″N 1°16′53″W	Category C(S)	47298	Upload Photo
Scalloway, Main Street, Olaf View				60°08′14″N 1°16′55″W	Category C(S)	47300	Upload Photo
Tingwall, St Magnus's Kirk, Including Kirkyard Walls, War Memorial, Enclosures, Gates And Gatepiers				60°10′34″N 1°14′48″W	Category B	18554	Upload Photo
Girlsta, Girlsta Lime Kiln				60°14′11″N 1°13′28″W	Category B	47292	Upload Photo
Scalloway, Main Street And Ladysmith Road, Norway House				60°08′13″N 1°16′57″W	Category C(S)	47301	Upload another image
Weisdale, Huxter, Ervhouse, Including Steading And Garden Walls				60°14′17″N 1°17′39″W	Category C(S)	47309	Upload Photo
Scalloway, Main Street, Scalloway Museum				60°08′14″N 1°16′31″W	Category C(S)	43268	Upload Photo
Scalloway, Main Street, Westmost Of Group, Including Anderson's Buildings (Known As The Meeting Room)				60°08′14″N 1°16′34″W	Category C(S)	43274	Upload Photo
Weisdale, Mill Of Kergord (Weisdale Mill)				60°15′37″N 1°17′18″W	Category C(S)	18564	Upload Photo
Girlsta, Mill Of Girlsta				60°14′14″N 1°13′26″W	Category B	18565	Upload another image
Scalloway, Castle Road And Castle Street, Fishermans Arms				60°08′07″N 1°16′28″W	Category C(S)	47296	Upload Photo
Scalloway, Main Street And Westshore, Prince Olav Slipway				60°08′13″N 1°16′52″W	Category C(S)	47302	Upload Photo
West Burra, Bridge End, Church Of Scotland, Including Boundary Walls, Railings And Gates				60°04′47″N 1°20′13″W	Category C(S)	44602	Upload Photo
Weisdale, Weisdale Church (Church Of Scotland)				60°15′20″N 1°17′23″W	Category B	18954	Upload Photo
Scalloway, Castle Road And Castle Street, Scalloway Castle, Including Boundary Walls				60°08′08″N 1°16′26″W	Category A	18559	Upload another image
West Burra, Duncansclate, Easthouse Croft, Including Cottages, Barn, Byres, Hen House, Pigsty, Lamb House And Skeo				60°03′44″N 1°20′26″W	Category B	18562	Upload Photo
Nesbister Point, Bod Of Nesbister, Including Steps				60°11′12″N 1°17′24″W	Category C(S)	47294	Upload Photo
Scalloway, New Street, The Bulwark				60°08′09″N 1°16′31″W	Category C(S)	47304	Upload Photo
Veensgarth, Veensgarth Steading				60°10′50″N 1°13′46″W	Category C(S)	47308	Upload Photo
Scalloway, Main Street, Anderson's Buildings: Inner Eastmost (Mowat & Co)				60°08′14″N 1°16′32″W	Category C(S)	43270	Upload Photo
Scalloway, Main Street, Anderson's Buildings: Inner West				60°08′14″N 1°16′33″W	Category B	43271	Upload Photo
Scalloway, Main Street, Gibblestone House, Including Boundary Walls And Gatepiers				60°08′16″N 1°16′36″W	Category C(S)	18557	Upload Photo
Scalloway, Berry Road, Scalloway Hall And Library, Including Railings And Gatepiers				60°08′19″N 1°16′36″W	Category C(S)	47295	Upload another image
Tingwall Manse, Including Boundary Walls And Gatepiers				60°10′31″N 1°14′47″W	Category C(S)	47306	Upload Photo
Weisdale, Kergord House, Including Glasshouse, Boundary Walls, Gates And Gatepiers				60°16′14″N 1°17′14″W	Category C(S)	47310	Upload Photo

== Key ==
The scheme for classifying buildings in Scotland is:

- Category A: "buildings of national or international importance, either architectural or historic; or fine, little-altered examples of some particular period, style or building type."
- Category B: "buildings of regional or more than local importance; or major examples of some particular period, style or building type, which may have been altered."
- Category C: "buildings of local importance; lesser examples of any period, style, or building type, as originally constructed or moderately altered; and simple traditional buildings which group well with other listed buildings."

In March 2016 there were 47,288 listed buildings in Scotland. Of these, 8% were Category A, and 50% were Category B, with the remaining 42% being Category C.
