= Allison Balfour =

Scottish witch

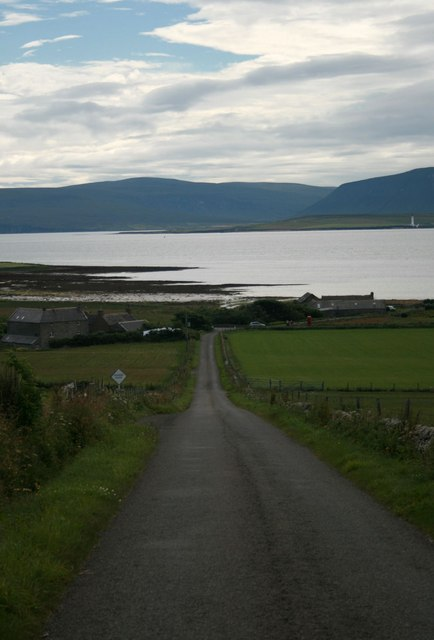
Allison Balfour lived in Scotland, an area of Stenness on mainland Orkney.

The 1594 trial of alleged witch Allison Balfour or Margaret Balfour (Note: A variety of spellings are used for her first name: Alesoun; Alison; Alysoun; and alternatively Margaret.) is one of the most frequently cited Scottish witchcraft cases. Balfour lived in the Orkney Islands of Scotland in the area of Stenness. At that time in Scotland, the Scottish Witchcraft Act 1563 had made a conviction for witchcraft punishable by death.

Patrick Stewart, 2nd Earl of Orkney, known as Black Patie, had control of Orkney in 1594 at the time of Balfour's trial. Patie was convinced that his younger brothers, especially John Stewart, Earl of Carrick, were plotting to kill him. Patie discovered poison in the possession of one of John's servants, Thomas Paplay, who after being tortured for eleven days confessed and implicated Balfour among his co-conspirators.

Although Paplay retracted his confession just before his execution, Balfour and her family were transported to Kirkwall, where they were tortured until a confession was extracted. Balfour was tried, found guilty of witchcraft, and sentenced to death. Just as Paplay had done, Balfour retracted her confession immediately before her execution on 16 December 1594, publicly proclaiming her innocence and detailing the tortures carried out on her and members of her family. She was executed at Gallow Ha' in Kirkwall on 16 December 1594.

== Background ==
The islanders of Orkney had a long tradition of belief in forms of witchcraft, sorcery and supernatural creatures. Magical powers were accepted as part of life and were not questioned. Witch hunts in Scotland began in about 1550; the parliament of Mary, Queen of Scots passed the Scottish Witchcraft Act in 1563 (though Mary under severe pressure from the Protestants had delayed the matter as long as possible), making witchcraft convictions subject to capital punishment. Although the Orkney archipelago was officially under Norwegian law until 1611, it had been held by Scotland from 1468 under the rule of Scottish earls. Patrick Stewart, 2nd Earl of Orkney, known as Black Patie, had control of the islands in 1594 at the time of the first witch trials. The Stewart family had a lot of ill-feeling towards each other: Patie had an acrimonious relationship with his father and showed a particular animosity towards his younger brothers, especially John Stewart, Earl of Carrick, whom Patie was convinced intended to have him murdered. He had found Thomas Paplay, John's servant, with poison. Paplay was tortured for eleven days until he confessed, naming Allison Balfour among the conspirators. He retracted his confession just before his execution.

Only sparse information is available on witch trials in Orkney before 1612, but details of Balfour's conviction have been described by Julian Goodare as "one of Scotland's most frequently-cited witchcraft cases." Balfour lived in an area of Stenness known as Ireland, (Note: This has led to some confusion with Balfour being mistakenly listed as Irish.) with her aged spouse Taillifeir and her children. A natural healer of some repute, she had been asked for advice on how best to cast a spell on Black Patie by his brothers and their friends, who were plotting to kill him. The first of several alleged consultations took place in October 1593, the outcomes of which are unknown but Black Patie suffered no apparent ill-effects. Nevertheless, Balfour was arrested and transported to Kirkwall to be tried in December 1594.

The case was unusual as it was instigated purely on the authority of Patie, whereas most Scottish witch trials required a commission of justiciary. Most witch trials were held in St Magnus Cathedral, where prisoners may also have been incarcerated, but Balfour was held in Kirkwall Castle. The Orcadian historian Ernest Marwick speculates that torture may have taken place in the cathedral. Balfour was interrogated for two days by Henry Colville of Orphir, a minister and close friend of Patie.

== Torture ==
Henry Colville attempted to gain sufficient evidence from Balfour to enable Patie to take action against his brother, John Stewart. She was subjected to brutal torture for a period of forty-eight hours with Colville assuming the roles of "interrogator and spiritual comforter". Her legs were enclosed in a contraption called caschielawes, a device made of iron that could be heated by a furnace until the victim's flesh started to burn. When she lost consciousness, as she did several times, the device was removed until she could be roused and the torture resumed. As Balfour continued to protest her innocence, Colville turned his attention to her husband, her son, and her seven-year-old daughter. Taillifeir, her husband, was tortured in front of her by the use of lang irons although it is unclear exactly what type of device this was. Marwick describes them as being fetters but historian Sigurd Towrie characterises them as a method of pressing by placing 700 pounds (320 kg) of stones on the victim's body. When Balfour still would not confess she was forced to watch her son having his legs put into an iron boot. The device, which stretched from his knee to his ankle, was struck fifty-seven times with a large hammer. The boots inflict severe crushing and mutilation to the flesh and bones.

Balfour reached her breaking-point when Colville tortured her daughter. He placed the young girl's hands in thumbscrews, also called pinniewinkles, pulverising the child's fingers. Colville assured Balfour that she would not be executed if she confessed. She relented and finally Colville secured enough of an admission of guilt for the court to be able to sentence her.

== Execution and aftermath ==
Despite Colville's pledge, Balfour was found guilty of conspiring to murder by the use of witchcraft and was sentenced to be strangled and burned. On 16 December 1594 (Note: The exact date varies: Linton gives 16 December as does Ewan, Innes & Reynolds whereas Towrie gives 15 December; Marwick does not specify a date. In the details of Scottish trials transcribed by the antiquarian Robert Pitcairn, he records Balfour's execution as on the "faxtene day of December 1594.") Balfour was taken to Gallow Ha' (Note: Various names for Gallow Ha' are given: Heding Hill is used by Pitcairn; Marwick and Towrie have Heiding Hill yet Marwick uses only the term Gallow Hill in another of his publications; and Willumsen writes Hedding Hill. It is located at the top of a street now called Clay Loan.) in Kirkwall to be executed. Before the strangulation she was required to make a declaration in front of the gathered crowd and five ministers, including Colville, for the notary public; instead she proclaimed her innocence and detailed the tortures carried out against her and her family. Immediately prior to Balfour's sentence being enacted, attempts were made to have her implicate the Laird of Stenhouse, Patrick Bellenden, in the conspiracy by questioning her about a piece of wax he had given her. It had been retrieved from her purse when she was arrested and her inquisitors considered it was to make an effigy. She denied their claims, stating it was to produce a treatment for Lady Bellenden's colic.

The long-standing acrimony between Patie and his brothers continued unabated; on 24 June 1596 John Stewart, Earl of Carrick was accused at the justiciary court in Edinburgh of scheming with Balfour to poison his brother, Patie. John Stewart defended himself by asserting that the confession should be ignored, as it was retracted and had only been obtained under torture. He was found not guilty.

Colville had continued to support Patie, and during 1595 was appointed Patie's depute. Three weeks after John Stewart's acquittal, Colville was attending to business on Patie's behalf at Nesting in Shetland. Stewart, together with a group of his friends who for a variety of reasons also despised Colville, sailed from Montrose to Shetland, replenishing supplies en route at Orkney. They landed in Shetland at Tingwall and made their way overland to where Colville was staying. It is uncertain which member of the group "maist schamefullie, crewallie and unmercifullie slew him" in July 1596, but on 14 October that year Stewart was tried for the murder and once again acquitted. William Stewart and Gilbert Pacock, (Note: Academic Peter Anderson refers to Pacock as Peacock.) one of John Stewart's employees, had in the interim been beheaded for the crime. (Note: An alternative theory suggests that Colville's assassins were men from the Sinclair family, whose land had been seized by Colville on behalf of Patie; Anderson dismisses the idea as "pure fantasy", and Marwick considers it "unlikely".)

== See also ==
- Isobel Gowdie
- Elspeth Reoch
- Witchcraft in Orkney
