= Elspeth Reoch =

Scottish cunning woman; alleged witch (d. 1616)

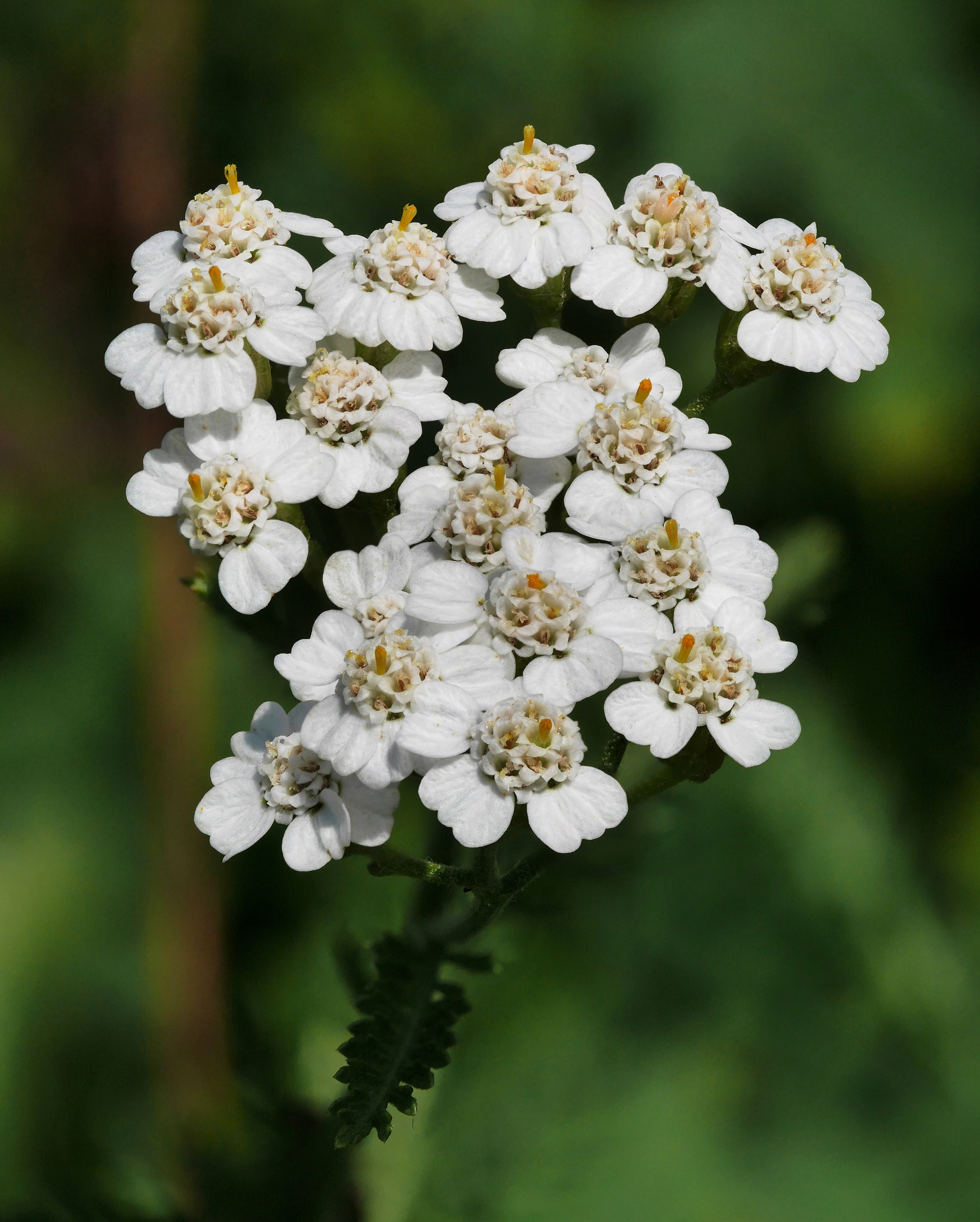
The melefour herb was considered to have many magical properties, including curing illnesses and conferring second sight; Reoch plucked petals from it while chanting to create magic spells.

Elspeth Reoch (died Kirkwall 1616) was an alleged Scottish witch. She was born in Caithness but as a child spent time with relatives on an island in Lochaber prior to travelling to the mainland of Orkney.

The implementation of the Scottish Witchcraft Act of 1563, made witchcraft a capital offence in Scotland, therefore punishable by death.

The early years of the 17th century were a time of political turmoil on the islands as the transition of power between Patrick Stewart, 2nd Earl of Orkney and the staunch episcopalian Bishop James Law took place. Once in control, Bishop Law instigated court reforms in 1614 that academics considered had a significant impact on witchcraft trials in Orkney. Any references to a fairy in statements given to interrogators by alleged witches were routinely changed to read devil or demon.

At her trial in Kirkwall on 12 March 1616 Reoch confessed to charges of witchcraft and deceiving islanders by pretending she was mute. Asserting she had received instructions on how to acquire magical powers when she was twelve years old while she was staying with an aunt in Lochaber, she claimed to have clairvoyance abilities. She also professed to being able to induce or cure illness by reciting chants while plucking petals from the melefour herb. Her lifestyle was that of a wanderer or vagabond who used her magic to support herself.

Reoch was found guilty and executed by strangulation; her body was burned that afternoon.

== Background ==
The islanders of Orkney had a long tradition of belief in broadly construed forms of witchcraft, sorcery and supernatural creatures. Magical powers were accepted as part of the general lifestyle and were not questioned. Witch hunts in Scotland began in about 1550; the parliament of Mary, Queen of Scots passed the Scottish Witchcraft Act in 1563, making witchcraft convictions subject to capital punishment. Although the Orkney archipelago was officially under Norwegian law until 1611, it had been held by Scotland from 1468 under the rule of Scottish earls. Patrick Stewart, 2nd Earl of Orkney, known as Black Patie, had control of the islands in 1594 at the time of the initial witch trials but the early years of the 17th-century were a period of political turmoil. Black Patie was incarcerated and eventually executed after he enraged King James who appointed James Law, a staunch Episcopalian, as Bishop of Orkney. Law took on the role of sheriff and oversaw later trials. (Note: In the areas of northern Orkney outside of Law's bishopric and all of Shetland, Sir James Stewart of Killeith, 4th Lord Ochiltree, was Lord Chamberlain and sheriff from 1613.) The historian Liv Helene Willumsen considers the court reforms instigated by Bishop Law around 1614 and the restoration of the bishops impacted significantly on the witch trials but failed to improve the neutrality of the proceedings.

== Personal life ==
Reoch's father, Donald Reoch, was a piper in the service of the Earl of Caithness. She had a sister and a brother. Although born in Caithness she stayed on an island in Lochaber, where at least two of her aunts lived, before arriving in Orkney.

No clear records of Reoch's marital status exist, but she bore at least two children to two men. After the birth of her first child Reoch maintained she was unable to speak. By this time her father had died leaving her brother as her most senior relative. She was violently beaten by him in his attempts to force her to talk. Using a form of torture that was similar to one later utilised by Graham of Claverhouse, he tightened a bowstring around her head; he also used a bridle with an iron bit to beat her. The beatings proved unsuccessful so he made her attend church with him to pray for help curing her; Reoch however remained mute for a lengthy period.

Orcadian historian Ernest Marwick describes her lifestyle as that of a wanderer, a person with nomadic tendencies or a beggar, whose claims of extrasensory perception provided her with an income. He considered her to be "harmless", a "poor deluded creature much abused by men whom she took to be fairies". She may have suffered from a type of sleep paralysis and also have been subjected to some form of trauma, possibly rape or incest, memories of which formed the basis of the story she relayed to her inquisitors. Historian Diane Purkiss speculates that Reoch's brother may have been her incestuous partner although this opinion is not shared by other academics.

== Charges and confession ==
Under interrogation Reoch stated that when she was twelve years old she was staying in Lochaber with one of her aunts. While she was standing at the side of the loch, waiting for a boat, she was approached by two men, one dressed in black the other in a plaid of green tartan. The man in green told her he thought she was pretty; despite protests from his companion, who felt Reoch would be unable to keep a secret, the man suggested he could tell Reoch how to know anything she wanted. Keen to possess mystical powers, Reoch pressed him to tell her what to do. He told her to boil an egg but she must not eat it. (Note: Many folk tales incorporate instructions that fairy food should not be consumed, a stipulation hungry islanders might find difficult to abide by.) Instead she was to use the condensation from cooking the egg to rub on her eyes with unwashed hands, which would give her the power to see and know everything she wanted.

She said the man dressed in green told her to go to the house of another one of her aunts who had a widow and her granddaughter either lodging or visiting. The family were unaware that the child, who was a similar age to Reoch, was pregnant by a married man until Reoch confronted her about it in front of them. After initially denying the accusation, the child pleaded with Reoch to help abort the pregnancy but she refused, telling her to ask Allan McKeldow (Note: McKeldow was the husband of Reoch's aunt.) who also declined to become involved. Less than two years later, after Reoch produced her own illegitimate child, one of the men appeared again at her bedside in her sister's house. She admitted that she had sexual intercourse with the "Farie man" after he had visited her on three nights in succession; this was the man who had been dressed in black when she first encountered them at the lochside. She claimed he was a relative named Johne Stewart, who had been fatally attacked, and that he informed her "he was neither dead nor alive but was forever trapped between heaven and earth". He told her that to retain her magic skills "she should henceforth be dumb".

Reoch confessed that by using her clairvoyance skills she had foreseen a group of men at an afternoon drinking session in the house of Edmond Callendar. These men included Patrick Traill, a man who she was pregnant by, and Robert Stewart, the illegitimate son of Black Patie; they all had ropes around their necks. The prediction had been made before the Earl of Caithness arrived in Orkney. (Note: Robert Stewart had been executed on 1 January 1615 after the Earl of Caithness had quelled the rebellion led by Stewart.) She also admitted creating a magic spell to cure illness by chanting "In nomine Patris, Filii, et Spiritus Sancti" while pulling the petals from the melefour herb between her thumb and finger. (Note: According to D. C. Watts in the Dictionary of Plant Lore the herb was considered "one of the greatest of magical and protective plants"; it could be used as a cure for many ailments, for protection against spirits and the leaves could bestow second sight.)

== Trial ==
In contrast to the Scottish mainland, where the Privy Council managed trials, there are no records of it having any involvement on Orkney where, from 1615, the Procurator Fiscal instigated hearings in the Sheriff Court or they were heard by the church elders. It was common for inquisitors to transcribe the word devil or demon in place of any appellation for a fairy an alleged witch may have used in their statement. The charges were brought against Reoch by Robert Coltart, the Procurator Fiscal appointed by Bishop Law. She was accused of deceiving the King's subjects with her charade of being unable to speak and committing the "abominable and divilesch cryme of witchcraft".

At her trial on 12 March 1616 (Note: The Survey of Scottish Witchcraft Database incorrectly lists her execution date as 22 March 1616.) in Kirkwall, Reoch admitted to having had several rendezvous with the Devil, who had assumed the form of a fairy; she said one of the meetings occurred on Halloween. At one of their assignations he informed her that "Orkney was Priestgone, as there were too many ministers in it". (Note: Priestgone is defined by Marwick as "Priest ridden".)

Reoch was found guilty and executed; she was strangled and then her body was burned that afternoon.

== See also ==
- Allison Balfour
