= Richard Gibson (architect) =

Richard Gibson ARIBA
- Born: Richard George Gibson; November 19, 1935; London, England
- Died: December 26, 2024 (aged 89); Lerwick, Shetland, Scotland
- Education: Architectural Association School of Architecture
- Occupation: Architect
- Spouse: Victoria Richards
- Children: 6
- Parent(s): Alec Gibson (father), Mary Wethered (mother)
- Awards: RIAS Lifetime Achievement Award (2010)
- Practice: Private practice in Lerwick (from 1972)
- Projects: John Jamieson Closs, Lerwick; Gremista housing, Lerwick; Grödians housing, Lerwick; Hamnavoe Primary School, Burra; Scalloway Museum

Richard George Gibson ARIBA (19 November 1935 – 26 December 2024) was a British architect born and trained in London but mainly known for his buildings in Shetland from the late 1960s. His works include social housing developments, schools and museums, as well as restoration and conversion projects. His best-known projects include the John Jamieson Closs (1982–84), Gremista (1999) and Grödians (2011) housing developments in Lerwick, Mainland, and Hamnavoe Primary School, Burra (1980). He received the Royal Institute of Architects in Scotland's lifetime achievement award in 2010, and continued to practise based in Lerwick until 2016.

== Biography ==
Gibson was born in London on 19 November 1935. His father, Alec Gibson, was an architect with the Design Research Unit, who designed buildings in a modern style. His mother, Mary (née Wethered), worked with puppets for BBC Television. He attended Bedales School near Petersfield, Hampshire, and then studied at the Architectural Association, London, where he was a contemporary of the well-known architects Neave Brown, Richard Rogers and Georgie Wolton. In 1964 Gibson became an Associate of the Royal Institute of British Architects (ARIBA).

He married the designer Victoria Richards in 1958. Her father, James Maude Richards, was an architecture writer and edited the Architectural Review; her mother, Peggy Angus, was a painter and designer. They soon started a family – they had six children – and lived in Camden, north London, initially in a council flat in a tower block and later in a mews house designed by Gibson, on Murray Mews, off Camden Square, along with other architects' own houses including ones by Team 4 and Tom Kay.

After graduating, he worked for British Rail, the education division of Middlesex County Council, and from 1963 Hampstead Borough Council, which in 1965 was absorbed into Camden Borough Council. Camden's architectural department, under Sydney Cook, was then at the forefront of the provision of high-quality, architect-designed social housing, and Gibson later recruited Brown to the department. According to the architectural critic Rowan Moore, who interviewed him in 2024, Gibson struggled to negotiate office politics in Camden, which was a factor in his sudden decision, in 1968 or 1969, to relocate with his family to Shetland.

Initially he served as Shetland's deputy county architect and, in 1972, he started his own practice in Lerwick, Mainland, later based on Commercial Street, where he remained for the rest of his career. The exploitation of North Sea oil from the 1970s led to an increased demand for housing in Shetland to accommodate oil workers, which provided many commissions. Gibson's experiences living in Camden with young children led him to design low-level housing, rather than blocks of flats. He lived in Lerwick and converted a ruined crofthouse at Leravoe, Walls, into a second home. In 2010, he received the lifetime achievement award from the Royal Institute of Architects in Scotland. He retired in 2016, his practice being continued by Adrian Wishart.

Gibson died on 26 December 2024 at Lerwick.

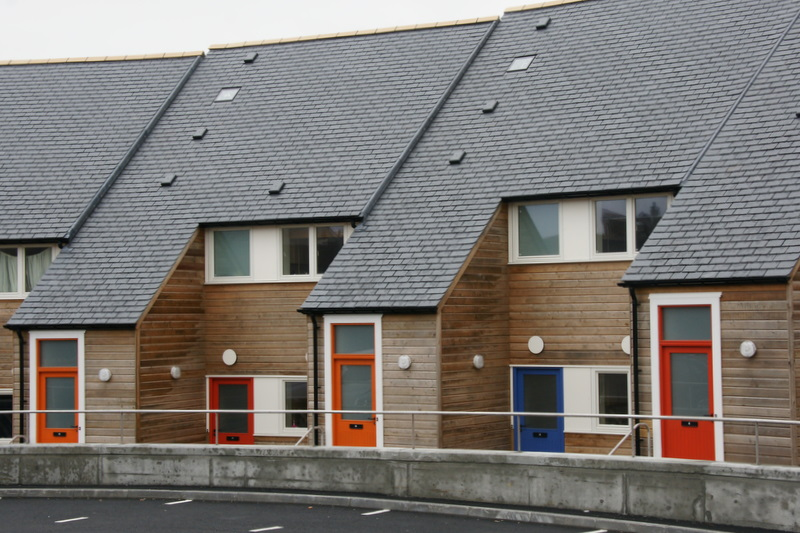
Da Vadill, Lerwick

== Style and works ==
Gibson's early works in Shetland used concrete blocks rendered in traditional Scottish fashion with harling, a roughcast coating containing small pebbles sourced from the local coast. An example is John Jamieson Closs, with harling described as a "crisp stark white". He later came to consider this practice environmentally unsound, and moved to constructing timber-framed buildings, finished with wooden cladding, which was sometimes painted in colours, such as Gremista and Grödians. The architecture critic Oliver Wainwright describes these as "colourful eco-friendly" and Norwegian in appearance. Moore considers the historic painted sheds facing Lerwick harbour to be a possible inspiration for Gibson's use of colours. Nick Brett, a colleague in the Shetland practice, detects influences on Gibson's work from his friend, the architect Ted Cullinan, and comments that his designs were better received by architects in mainland Scotland than by locals.

=== New buildings ===
His best-known work in London is his own house at 20, Murray Mews, Camden (1965–69). This is in rough brick with an L-shaped front and walled courtyard; the main open-plan living space is open to the roof level, and is illuminated by a roof light.

Gibson's Scottish buildings are mainly in Lerwick and Scalloway on Mainland, Shetland. He designed several housing developments for Hjaltland Housing Association, notably four in Lerwick: John Jamieson Closs, Hill Lane (1982–84), Gremista (1999), Grödians (2011) and Da Vadill (2012). John Jamieson Closs is a small dense development, occupying a sloping site (closs is a local word referring to a [steep] lane); Moore describes it as a "compressed and varied composition of courts and lanes, of projections and recessions and angles and curves", which "takes pleasure in the changes of level". A local journalist describes it as "deftly" fitting into the dense network of Lerwick's historic lanes. Gremista and Grödians are wood-cladded, timber-framed developments, painted in different shades of blue, purple, red and brown. Grödians won an RIAS Award in 2012 and was shortlisted for the RIAS Andrew Doolan Best Building in Scotland Award in 2011. Da Vadill, one of his last projects, employs a curved design adapted to an "awkward" site. Another project in Lerwick is a terraced housing development on a steeply sloping site on North Road. Gibson also designed private houses, including Gibblestone Court (1989), a small development of single-storey houses adjacent to the 18th-century Gibblestone House in Scalloway, which he converted into flats at the same time.

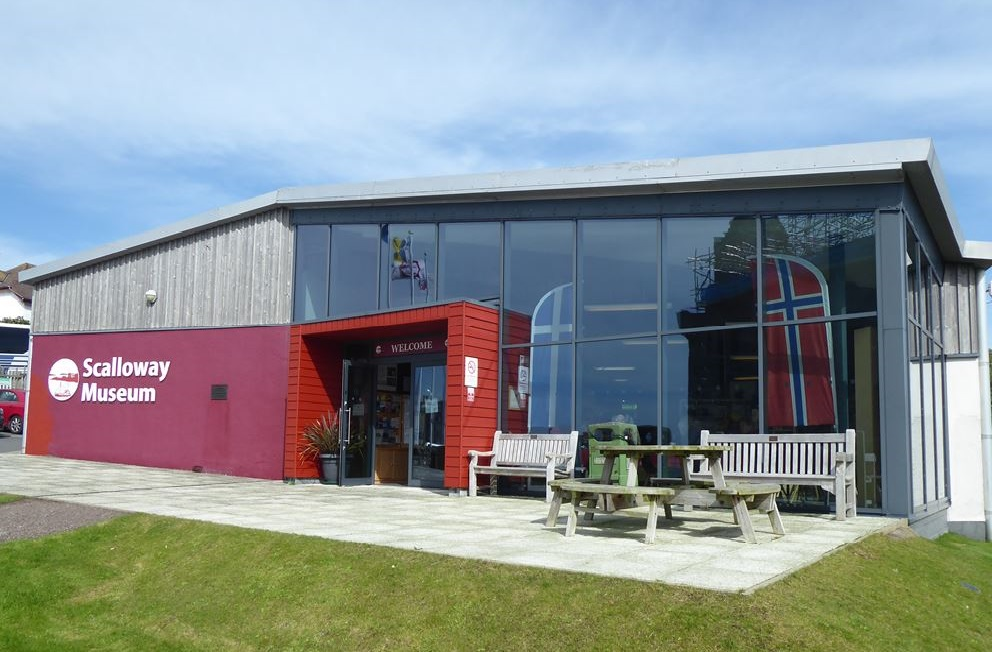
Scalloway Museum

He designed primary schools in Hamnavoe, Burra, and on Whalsay. Hamnavoe Primary School (1980) has a simple design, with a steel frame finished in white render; the main teaching block has five identical bays with gently angled gables that recede in steps. The exterior has low rounded walls which delineate small play areas, protecting them from the wind. The design was commended by the Royal Institute of British Architects (1983). Moore calls it "light, airy"; the local architecture writer Mike Finnie describes it as suitably proportioned for the settlement, "casual and fragmented enough to fit". The practice also designed council offices, and Gibson was responsible for the administration building of Dales Voe Oilrig Base (1986) in Lerwick.

=== Restorations and conversions ===
Gibson was also known for his conservation work. He restored Symbister House, a Georgian former country house on Whalsay, as well as the 18th-century Pier House (1984), also in Symbister, now a museum. His restoration projects elsewhere in Shetland include Weisdale Mill (1987), now an arts and crafts centre, and Quendale Mill (1990), now a museum, and several historic buildings in Lerwick, including 2–8 Commercial Street (around 1985), 10 Commercial Street (1988), the Peerie Shop (1988) and the Albert Building (1990) on the harbour front. He converted a disused textile mill into Scalloway Museum; Voxter House, a 19th-century former manse in Brae, Delting, into an outdoor centre (1985); the Haa of Bayhall, a three-storey laird's house of around 1750 in Walls, into flats (1978); and Sandsting church, Semblister, into a dwelling (1985).
