= Scalloway Museum =

Museum in Shetland, Scotland

Coordinates: 60°08′10″N 1°16′25″W

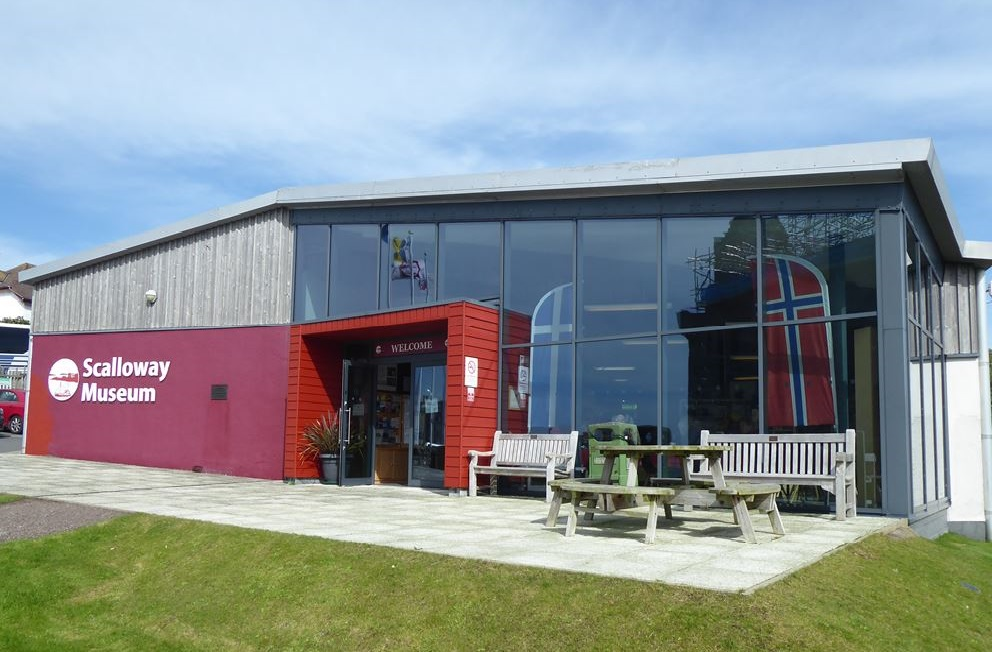
Scalloway Museum in 2022

Scalloway Museum is a local museum in Scalloway, Shetland. The museum has collections that cover the history of the Shetland Islands as well as historical subjects such as the Shetland bus operations. The museum also holds local historical records. The museum is located in the centre of Scalloway.

== History ==
The museum began in 1985 under the direction of the local Scalloway History Group. Between 2007 and 2011, an abandoned woollen mill adjacent to Scalloway Castle was restored and converted to house the museum to a plan by Richard Gibson Architects. In 2012, the museum reopened in the former mill with an official opening ceremony by Jens Stoltenberg, the Prime Minister of Norway.
