= Scalloway Public Hall =

Municipal building in Scalloway, Scotland

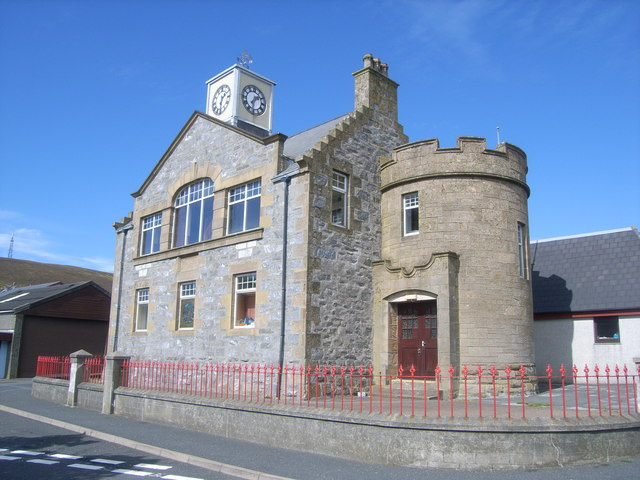
- The building in 2008

- Shown in Shetland
- 60.1385°N 1.2767°W
- Location: Berry Road, Scalloway

History
- Built: 1902

Site notes
- Architectural style: Freestyle

Listed Building – Category C(S)
- Official name: Scalloway, Berry Road, Scalloway Hall and Library, including railings and gatepiers
- Designated: 28 July 2000
- Reference no.: LB47295

Scalloway Public Hall is a municipal building on Berry Road in Scalloway in Shetland in Scotland. The building, which is used as a community events venue, is a Category C listed building.

== History ==
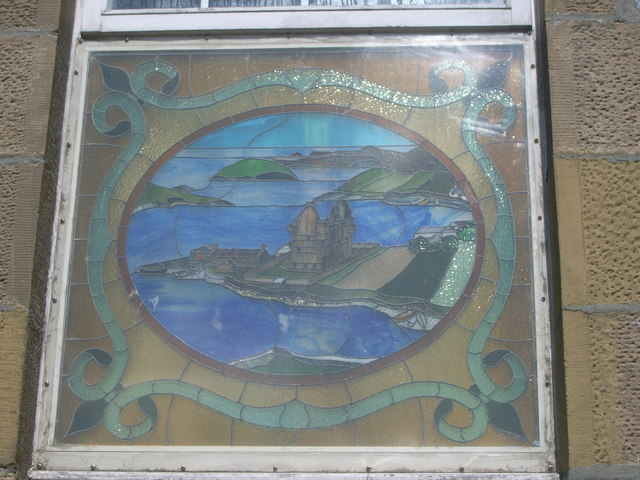
Stained glass, depicting Scalloway Castle, in the centre window on the ground floor

Following significant population growth, largely associated with fishing industry, civic leaders decided to commission a public hall for Scalloway. The development, which was financed by the Scottish-American businessman, Andrew Carnegie, included a public library and a mechanics' institute. The site they selected was open land on the west side of Berry Road.

The new building followed a freestyle design, was built in rubble masonry with ashlar stone dressings and was completed in 1902. The design involved a main block of three bays, with a circular entrance tower to the right, facing south onto Berry Road. The main block was fenestrated by three casement windows on the ground floor and by a large Venetian window on the first floor with a wide gable above. At roof level, there was a square metal tower with a slate base and clock faces, surmounted by a weather vane. The circular entrance tower, which was faced in ashlar stone, featured a doorway in a stone surround on the ground floor, and a casement window on the first floor, all surmounted by a crenelated parapet. Internally, the principal room was the assembly hall, which stretched back to the north behind the main frontage.

During the Second World War, when Scalloway accommodated the headquarters of the Shetland bus, part of the Norwegian resistance against the German occupation, the public hall operated as a 100-bed hospital for use by soldiers and evacuees from Norway. The assembly hall was extended to the east and west with modern additions during the second half of the 20th century.

In the early 1970s, the building was the venue for a talk by the county development officer from Zetland County Council, Michael Stansbury, on the proposed Sullom Voe Terminal and the likely implications for Scalloway as a potential service centre. In the 21st century, the building continued to be used for public meetings, film premieres and concerts. Performers have included Jarvis Cocker and Candida Doyle from the rock band, Pulp, who appeared at a function in August 2023.

== See also ==
- List of listed buildings in Tingwall, Shetland Islands
