= Scalloway =

Human settlement in Shetland, Scotland

Coordinates: 60.137°N 1.281°W

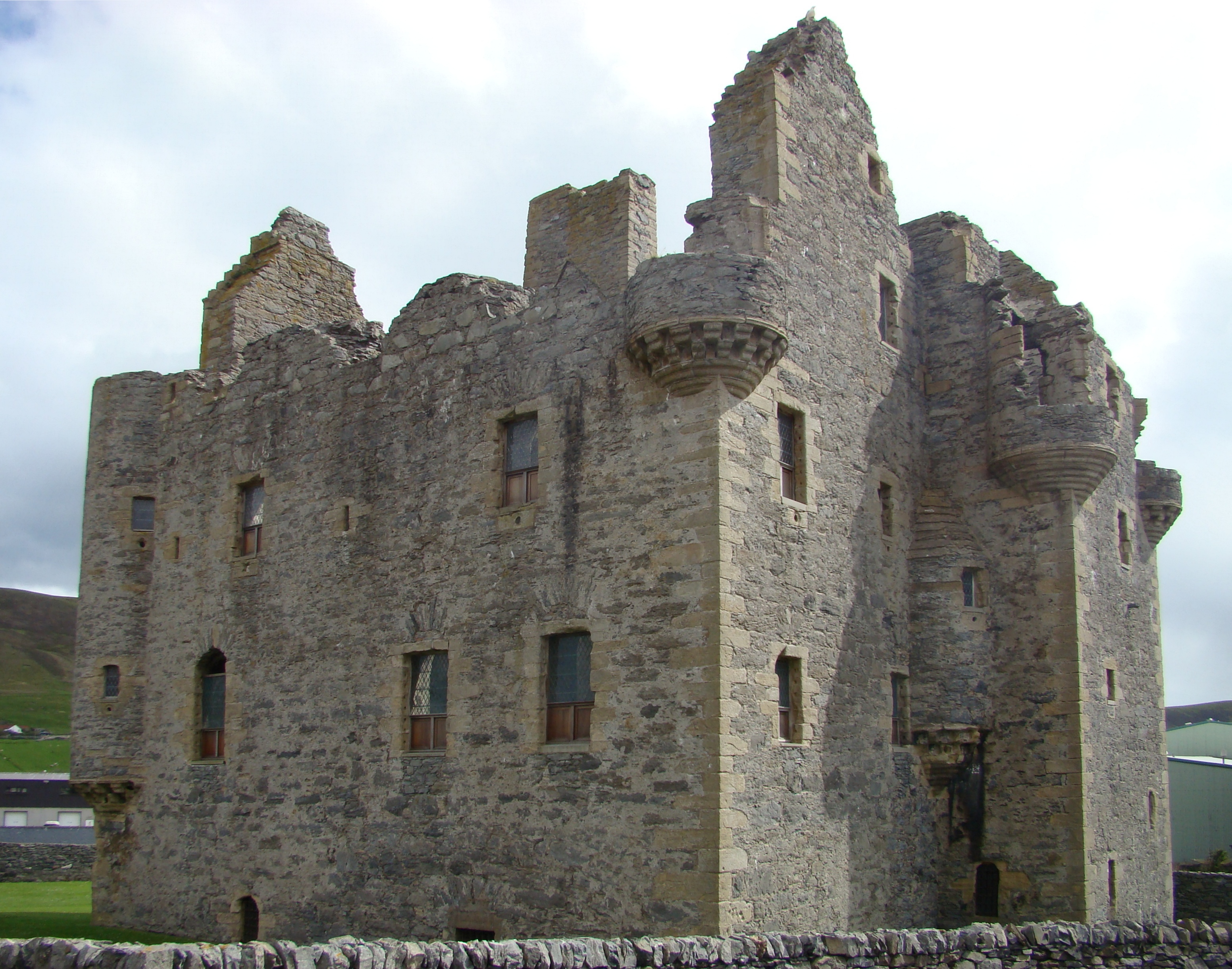
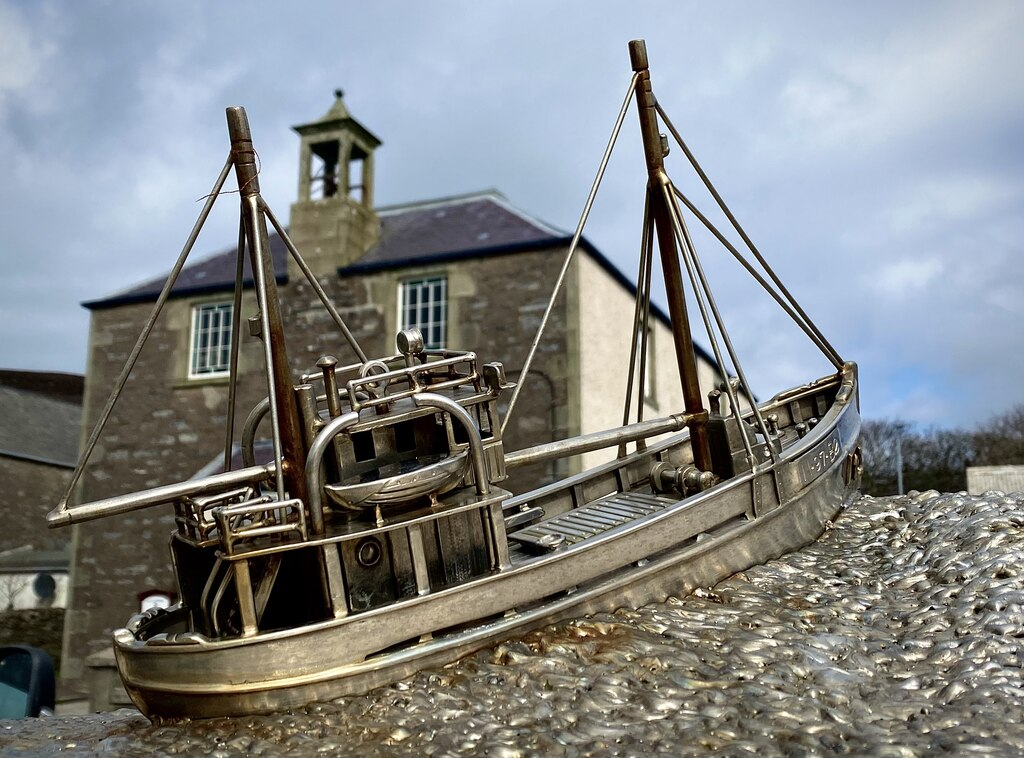
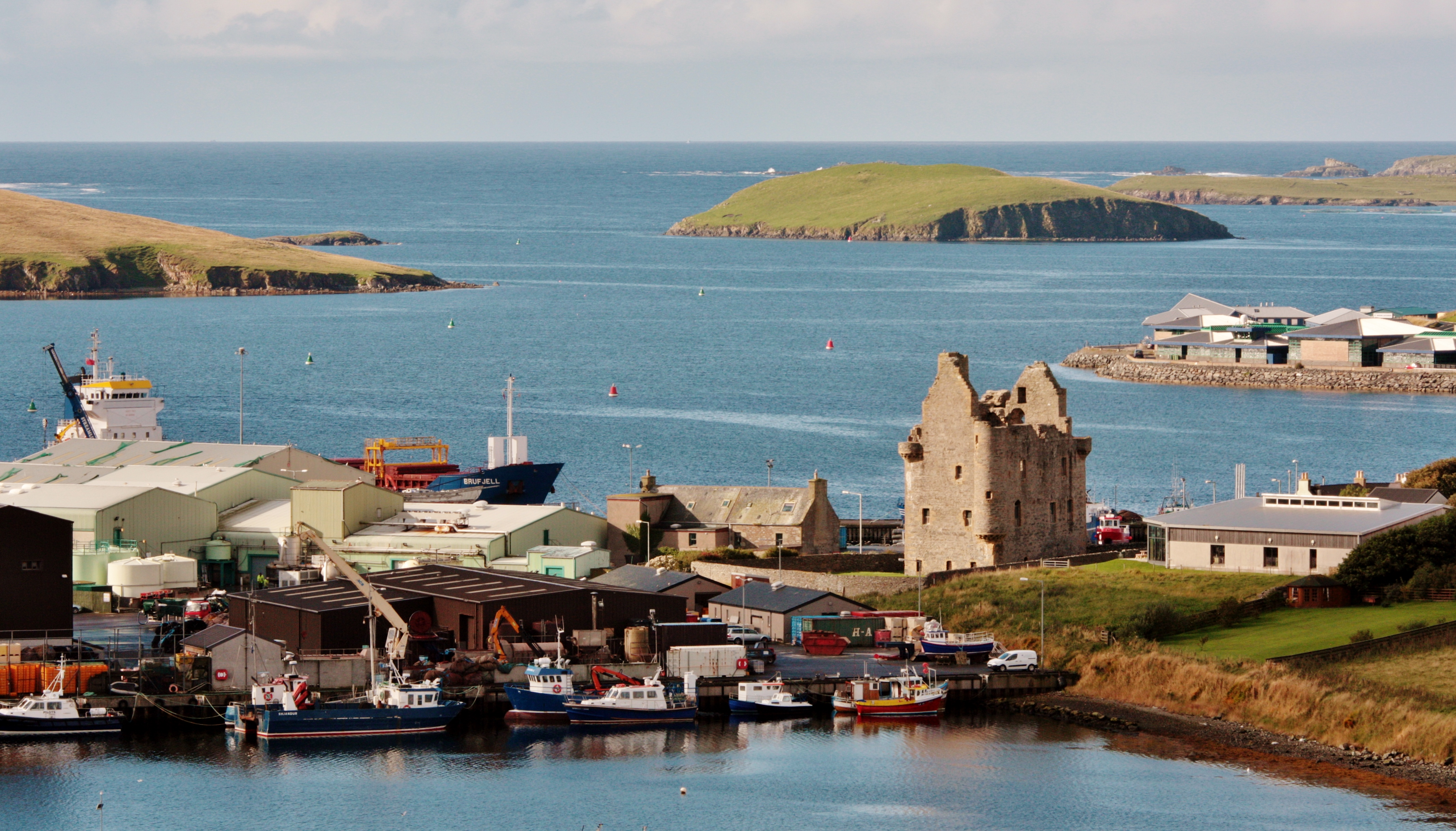
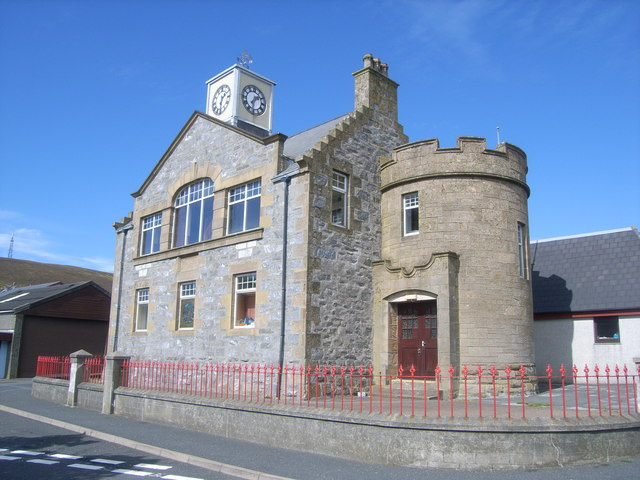
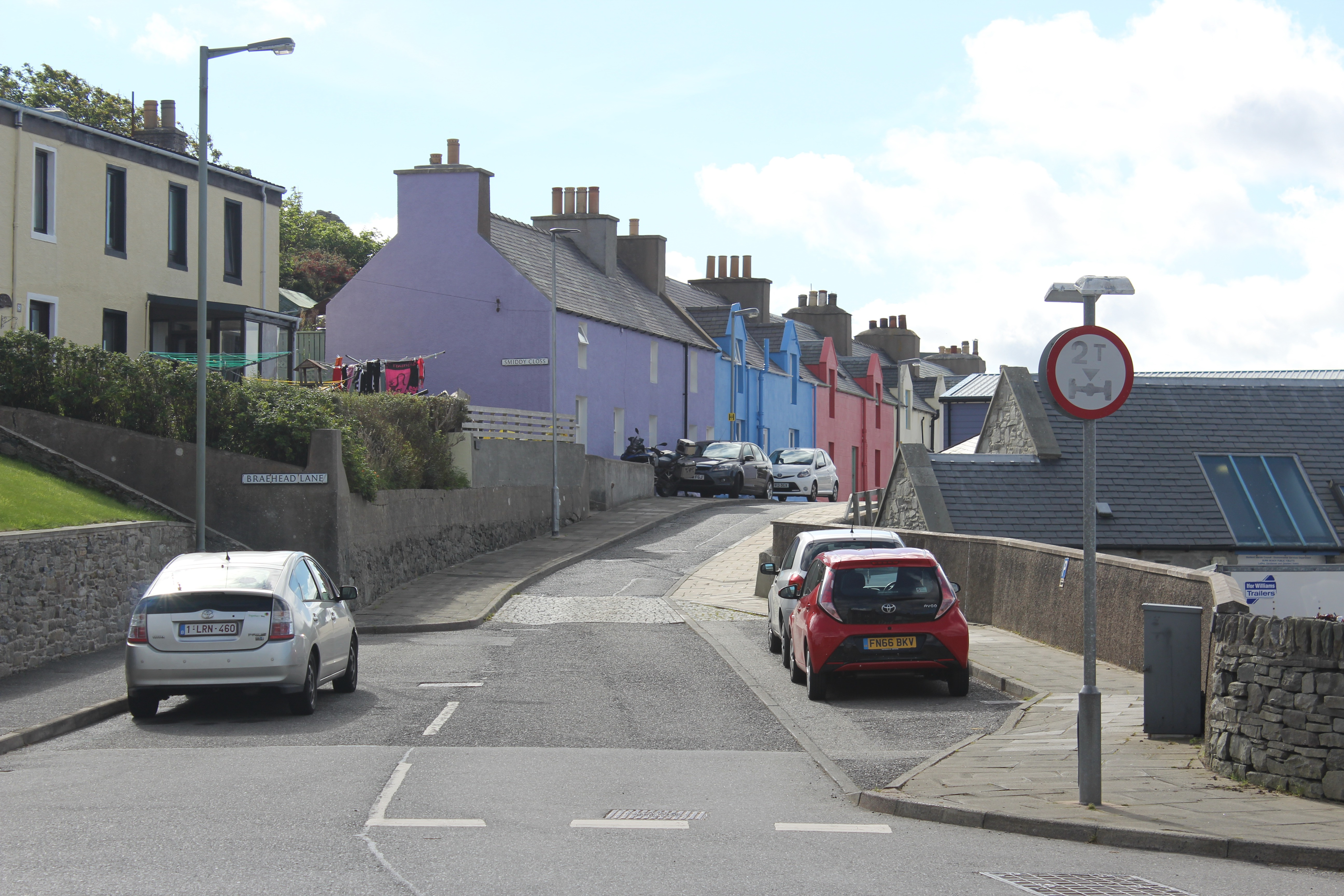
- The Castle The Memorial View of Scalloway Public Hall New Street

- Location within Shetland
- Population: 1,170 (2020)
- OS grid reference: HU399393
  - Edinburgh: 297 mi (478 km)
  - London: 598 mi (962 km)
- Civil parish: Tingwall
- Council area: Shetland
- Lieutenancy area: Shetland
- Country: Scotland
- Sovereign state: United Kingdom
- Post town: SHETLAND
- Postcode district: ZE1, ZE2
- Dialling code: 01595
- Police: Scotland
- Fire: Scottish
- Ambulance: Scottish
- UK Parliament: Orkney and Shetland
- Scottish Parliament: Shetland

Scalloway (Shaetlan pronunciation: [ˈskaɫəwə] SKA-lə-wə; Old Norse: Skálavágr, name of the bay) is the largest settlement on the west coast of the Mainland, the largest island of Shetland, Scotland. The village had a population of roughly 900, at the 2011 census. Now a fishing port, until 1708 it was the capital of the Shetland Islands (now Lerwick, on the east coast of the Shetland Mainland). It contains one of the two castles built in Shetland; this one was constructed in 1600. Nearby are the Scalloway Islands, which derive their name from the village.

== History ==
Scalloway Castle was built in 1600 by Patrick Stewart, 2nd Earl of Orkney. It was originally surrounded by water but due to land reclamation, that is no longer the case. The remains of the castle are the most notable feature of the village, located near the quay. (The castle is usually locked, but a key can be borrowed from the nearby Scalloway Hotel or from the adjacent Scalloway Museum.)

Norwegian boatbuilders from Hordaland, in the areas around Bergen, Os, and Tysnes, built yoals from about the 16th century. Oselvar, the traditional small wooden boat of Os, were taken apart and then 'flat packed' for shipping to Scalloway. Instead of sending complicated assembly instructions, they sent boatbuilders to rebuild them. Many of these stayed for years in Shetland, and some married there.

To the Hanseatic merchants from Bremen and Hamburg, Scalloway was known as Schaldewage, and as a good sheltered harbour on the route to Hillswick.

Barbara Tulloch and her daughter Ellen – probably the last witches to be burned in Shetland – were executed on Gallow Hill, overlooking the village in 1690. Scalloway Public Hall on Berry Road was completed in 1902.

During the Second World War, Scalloway was the home base for, and housed for some time the headquarters of the Shetland Bus, part of the Norwegian resistance against the German occupation. It was operated by Norwegian Resistance and British Secret Service who ran small craft to Norway to assist the Norwegians. The Norway House and the Prince Olav Pier / slipway, which formed major parts of the base are still existing. Details of the history of The Shetland Bus are on display at the Scalloway Museum.

In 1996, Kåre Emil Iversen published his wartime memoirs, I Shetland Bus Man. It was reprinted in 2004, with a new introduction and the title Shetland Bus Man. Another Shetland author Willie Smith discusses this period extensively in his 2003 memoir Willie's War and Other Stories as does David Howarth in The Shetland Bus (first published in 1951, later printings up to 2018).

After the war Scalloway served as harbour of the Shetland-Orkney ferry service (MV Orcadia) on the Scalloway–Stromness route. After the opening of the Schiehallion oilfield off the west coast of Shetland, Scalloway took over some functions as a service base for the oil business.

== Education ==
Scalloway is the location of the North Atlantic Fisheries College (part of the University of the Highlands and Islands), which offers courses and supports research programmes in fisheries sciences, aquaculture, marine engineering and coastal management. It is also home to the Centre for Nordic Studies. NAFC Marine Centre at Ness of Westshore offers courses in "nautical studies, marine science and technology, and seafood quality".

The village has a swimming pool and a primary school. Scalloway Junior High School, the secondary department, was closed by the Shetland Islands Council in July 2011.

== Transport ==
The service 4 bus operated by R Robertson & Son runs thirteen times from Lerwick between the times of 07:20 to 22:00 Monday to Thursday and 07:30 to 23:30 on Fridays and Saturdays. Service 5, run by Andrew's of Whiteness runs from East Voe (Blydoit) three times a day to the isles of Tronda and Burra and extends with service 4. The service 4 bus runs four times on a Sunday from Lerwick between 11:40 and 19:00.

== Notable people ==
- Sandra Voe (born 1936), actress

== Other sources ==
- Howarth, David (1950) The Shetland Bus: A WWII Epic of Escape, Survival, and Adventure (Lyons Press) ISBN 978-1-59921-321-7
- Iversen, Kaare (2000) Shetland Bus Man (Pentland Press Ltd) ISBN 978-1-85821-816-8
- Sorvaag, Trygve (2005) Shetland Bus: Faces and Places 60 Years on (Shetland Times Ltd) ISBN 978-1-898852-88-9
- Smith, Willie (2003) Willie's War and Other Stories (Shetland Times Ltd) ISBN 978-1-898852-97-1
- Howarth, D. The Shetland Bus; Nelson, 1951
