= Scalloway Castle =

Tower house in Scalloway, Scotland

Coordinates: 60.13627°N 1.27429°W

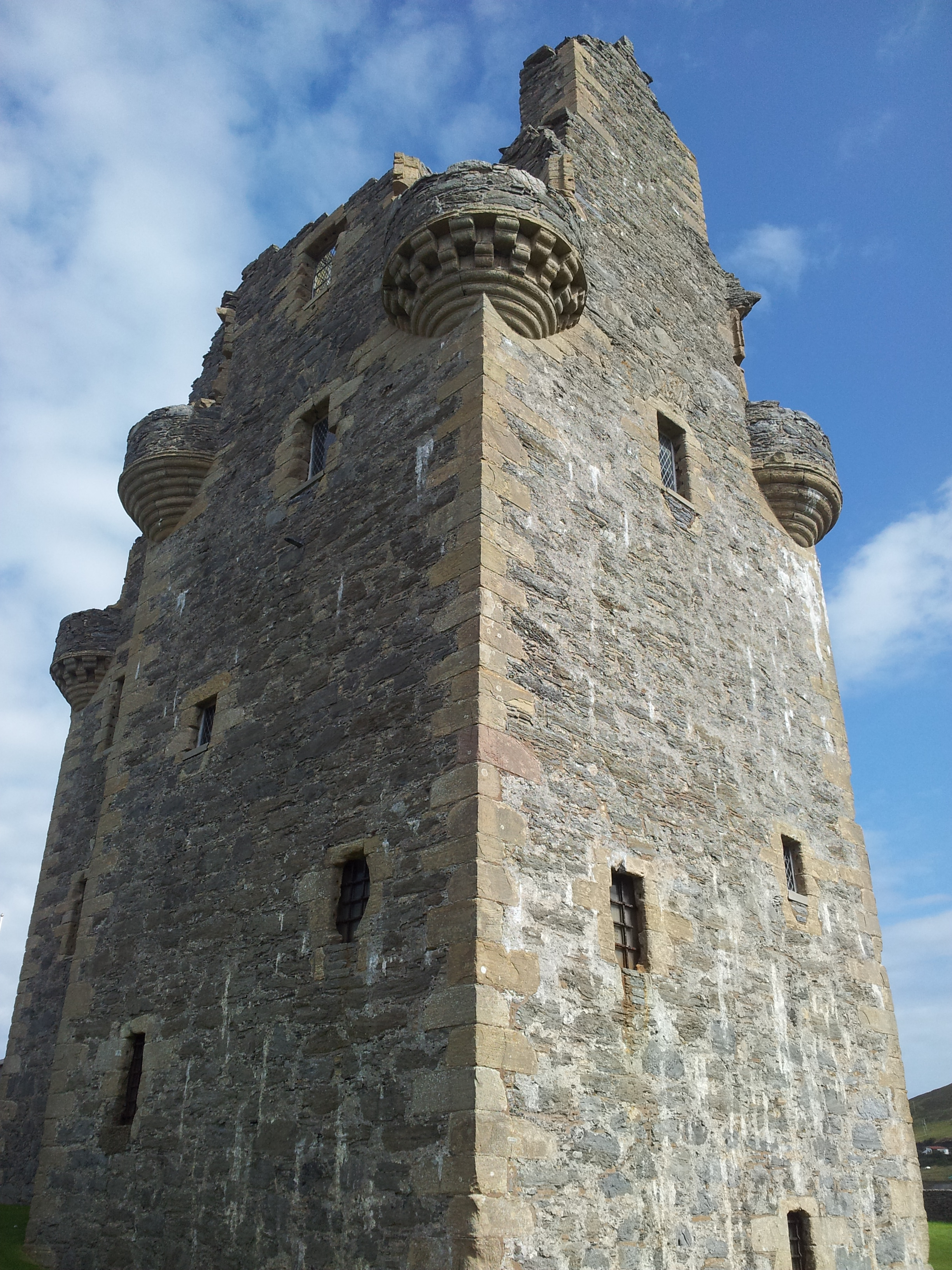
Scalloway Castle in August 2013

Scalloway Castle is a tower house in Scalloway, on the Shetland Mainland, the largest island in the Shetland Islands of Scotland. The tower was built in 1600 by Patrick Stewart, 2nd Earl of Orkney, during his brief period as de facto ruler of Shetland.

== History ==
In 1564, Robert Stewart (1533–1593), illegitimate son of King James V, was granted lands in Orkney and Shetland and subsequently established himself as a powerful but unscrupulous figure in the islands. Despite numerous complaints against him for seizing lands and misusing taxes, Stewart was later made Earl of Orkney and Lord of Shetland by King James VI. He remained unpopular with the local lairds, and they subsequently turned the king against Stewart, who died impoverished in 1593, having had his earldom revoked in 1587. Robert Stewart's son Patrick (c. 1566 – 6 February 1615), who had been on unfriendly terms with his father, remained in the king's favour and was himself created Lord of Shetland in 1590. He effectively succeeded as Earl of Orkney on his father's death, though this was not formalised until 1600. In Shetland he continued to appropriate lands and feuded with the lairds: Laurence Bruce of Cultmalindie, son of Robert Stewart's ally, became his chief opponent.

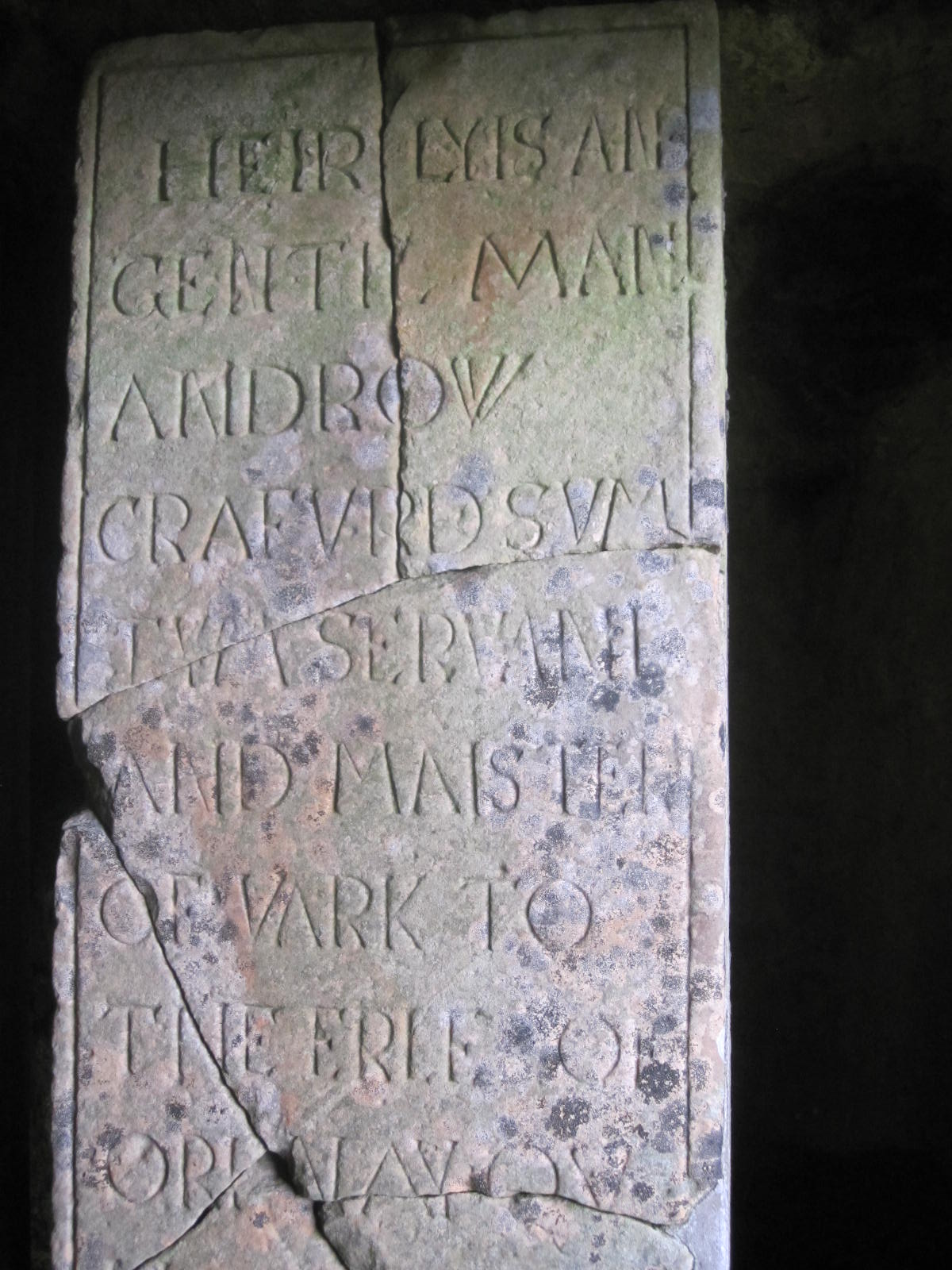
Monument to Androw Crafurd, Maister of Wark, at Tingwall, at that time the church for Scalloway

Following his charter of the Earldom in 1600, Stewart began the construction of Scalloway Castle which was completed around 1607. His main residence was the Earl's Palace, built by his father on Birsay, Orkney, while Scalloway was used by his representative in Shetland. The new castle also served as a meeting place for the thing (parliament) of Shetland during Earl Patrick's ascendancy. Construction of the castle was undertaken by unpaid workers, summoned by Patrick from the parishes of Shetland, and was overseen by his master of works, Andrew Crawford. Crawford was probably also responsible for Patrick's Earl's Palace in Kirkwall, and Muness Castle on Unst, built for Bruce of Cultmalindie.

In 1609 the Shetland lairds complained to the king of Earl Patrick's misrule of the islands. Patrick was subsequently imprisoned at Edinburgh Castle, and was executed in 1615 for encouraging his son Robert to retake his Orkney possessions. Meanwhile, control of the islands was given over to James Law, Bishop of Orkney, who held his first court at Scalloway Castle in August 1612. In 1653 troops were stationed in the castle, and by the early 18th century its condition was described as poor. Some of the ornamental stonework was removed to be incorporated into the Haa of Sand, an 18th-century house to the north-west of Scalloway. The ruins were placed into state care in 1908, and are now maintained by Historic Scotland. Excavations in 1979–1980 uncovered the remains of 17th-century outbuildings to the north of the tower.

== Description ==
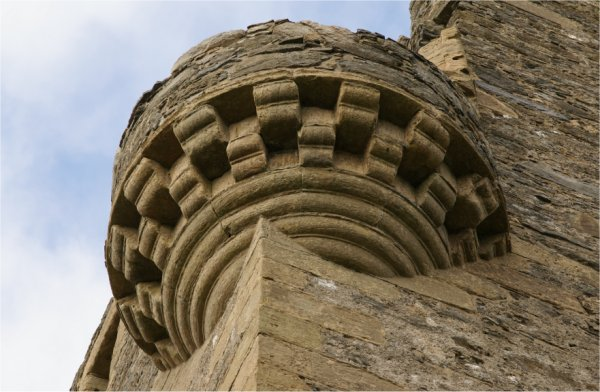
Detail of the corbelling on the castle

Scalloway Castle is built on an L-plan, with a main tower of 18 by 10 metres (59 by 33 ft), and a wing to the south-west of 8 metres (26 ft) square. The roofless castle is of four storeys, with an additional garret over the main tower. The ground level is tunnel-vaulted, containing kitchens, stores and a well. A straight staircase leads up to the hall on the first floor, with spiral stairs leading to upper storeys. Around the third floor are bartizans (corner towers) projected on decorative corbelling.

There is an inscription above the door, illegible today but recorded in the 18th century as "Patrick Stewart, Earl of Orkney and Shetland. James V King of Scots. That house whose foundation is on a rock shall stand but if on sand shall fall..." The castle is a scheduled monument.
