= Margaret Livingstone, Countess of Orkney =

Scottish courtier and landowner

Margaret Livingstone, Countess of Orkney (died 1622) was a Scottish courtier and landowner. She was a daughter of William Livingstone, 6th Lord Livingston and Agnes Fleming.

== Lady Justice Clerk ==
In July 1581, she married Lewis Bellenden of Broughton and Auchnoull, Lord Justice Clerk, and was known as "Lady Justice Clerk" or "Lady Auchinoul". Mary, Queen of Scots, wrote to the French ambassador Michel de Castelnau that she had hoped "Lady Livingstone" would come to England and join her household instead of marrying.

They had three sons and two daughters, of whom his son and heir was James Bellenden of Broughton. Two other sons went to Ulster. Mariota Bellenden married Patrick Murray of Falahill.

She was an attendant of Anne of Denmark at her coronation in Holyrood Abbey on 17 May 1590. The University of Edinburgh has a bill for clothes signed by Margaret Livingstone in 1590.

Lewis Bellenden died on 27 August 1591, after 8 days of "deadly fever" according to a letter of his brother, James Bellenden.

== Lady in waiting ==
Margaret was then a gentlewoman in the households of Anna of Denmark at Dunfermline Palace and Prince Henry at Stirling Castle.

The other "dames of honour" at Stirling were; Annabell Murray, Countess of Mar, Marie Stewart, Countess of Mar, Agnes Leslie, Countess of Morton, her aunt Lady Dudhope, Lady Clackmannan, Lady Abercairny, and Lady Cambuskenneth.

In May 1596 the Edinburgh money lender Janet Fockart died and Livingstone had borrowed at least £100 Scots and had pledged a diamond chain with 13 pieces and a diamond ring. The money lender's final inventory was compiled after Livingstone's marriage, and she was recorded as "Lady Orkney".

== Countess of Orkney ==
On 19 August 1596 she married Patrick Stewart, 2nd Earl of Orkney at Callendar House. James VI was present at the banquet until he was called away to see his new-born child at Dunfermline, Princess Elizabeth. The couple had no children.

She subsequently raised money to help her husband. She disputed monies owed to Walter Cranstoun, the steward of the Bellenden lands she held as a widow in "conjunct fie". Her case included a claim that she could not contract new debts without her husband's permission and "advice and knowledge". She also had debts for rent in Linlithgow, perhaps for attending Princess Elizabeth, who was brought up by the Livingstone family at Linlithgow Palace.

The exact date of her death is unknown. She signed a receipt in Edinburgh for her royal pension of 1,000 merks in January 1622.
