= Earl's Palace, Birsay =

Ruined castle in Birsay, Orkney, Scotland

Earl's Palace
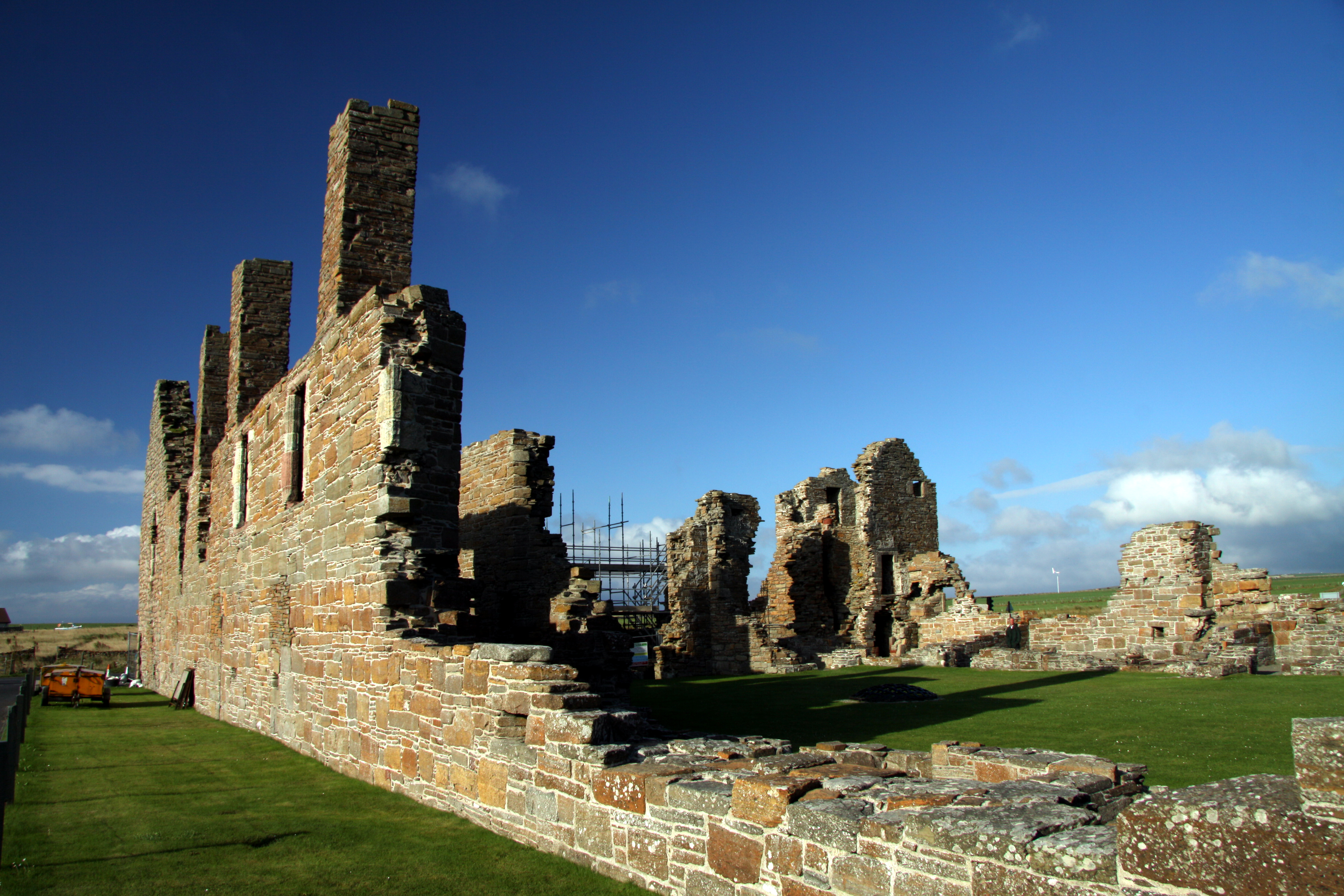
- The Earl's Palace, Birsay
- Interactive map of Earl's Palace
- 59°07′48″N 3°18′55″W
- Type: Castle
- Location: Birsay, Orkney, Scotland

History
- Built: 16th century

Site notes
- Material: Stone
- Public access: Yes

Scheduled monument
- Official name: Earl's Palace, Birsay
- Type: Secular: hall; palace; well
- Designated: 22 February 1994
- Reference no.: SM90033

The Earl's Palace in Birsay, Orkney, Scotland, is a ruined 16th-century castle. It was built by Robert Stewart, 1st Earl of Orkney (1533–1593), illegitimate son of King James V and his mistress Euphemia Elphinstone. The palace is in the care of Historic Environment Scotland as a scheduled monument.

== History ==
Adam Bothwell, Bishop of Orkney, had a house at Birsay, which he called the "place of Birsay". In December 1560, it was taken and occupied by Henry Sinclair of Strom, an Orkney landowner and a son of Edward Sinclair, the Sheriff of Orkney.

The castle was constructed in two phases. The first phase of work, begun in the 1570s, consisted of the great hall located in the south range, above the main door. Beside this was Lord Orkney's private chamber in the south-east corner tower. An inscription above the entrance, dated 1574, marks this phase. The second phase, completed in the 1580s, saw a new range containing a great hall and chamber built on the north side of the courtyard. The second phase probably followed Robert's acquisition of the Earldom of Orkney in 1581. After the death of Robert Stewart, the palace was used only occasionally by later earls of Orkney, and was not occupied after the mid-17th century. By 1701 the palace had begun to deteriorate badly.

== The castle ==
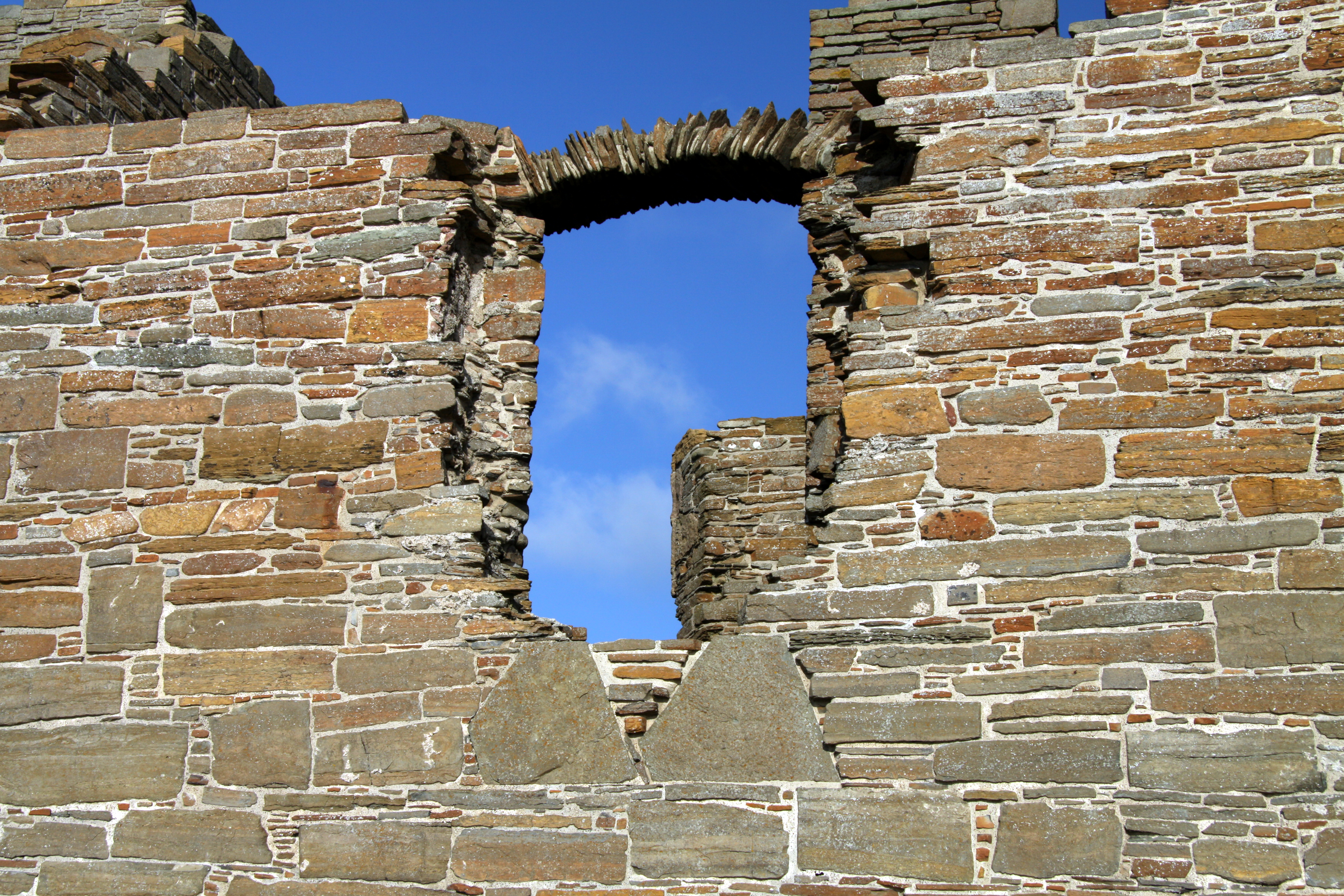
Detail of the window

The two-storey palace was constructed around a central courtyard and well, with large stone towers at three of the four corners. It was as much a fortress as a residence. Only the palace's upper floors had large windows; the accessible ground floors were equipped with small openings and an array of gun-holes, from which musketeers could cover every side of the building.

Few records of the palace remain to give a clear impression of its contents and layout. The Reverend John Brand published a book about Orkney in 1701, and included a description of the palace. He wrote:

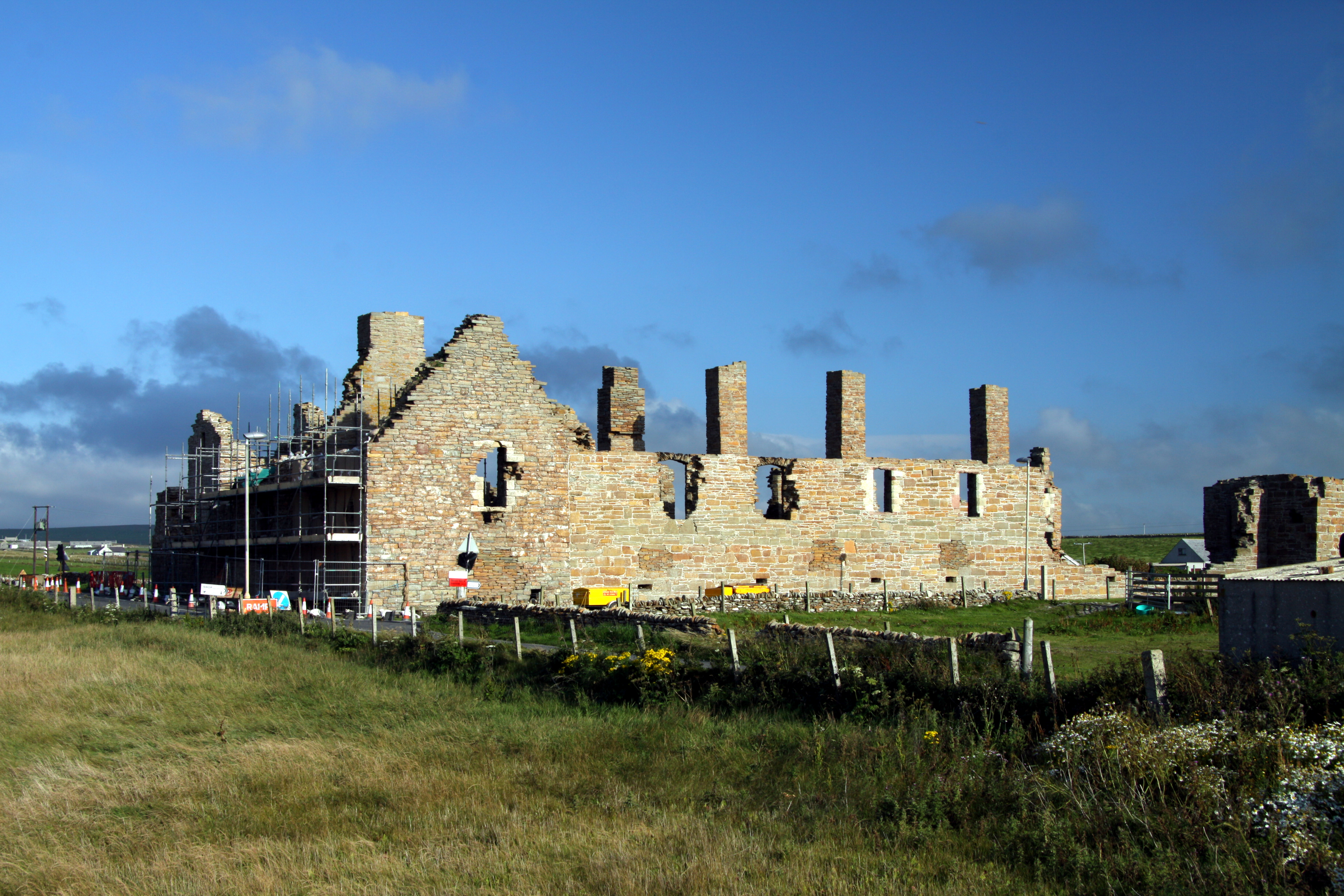
Earl's Palace in Birsay during reconstruction

"[The upper floor] hath been prettily decored, the Ceiling being all Painted, and that for the most part with schems holding forth scripture-histories, as Noah's floud, Christ's riding to Jerusalem &c. And the Scripture is set doun beside the Figure."
