= Earl's Palace, Kirkwall =

Ruined Renaissance-style palace in Scotland

Earl's Palace
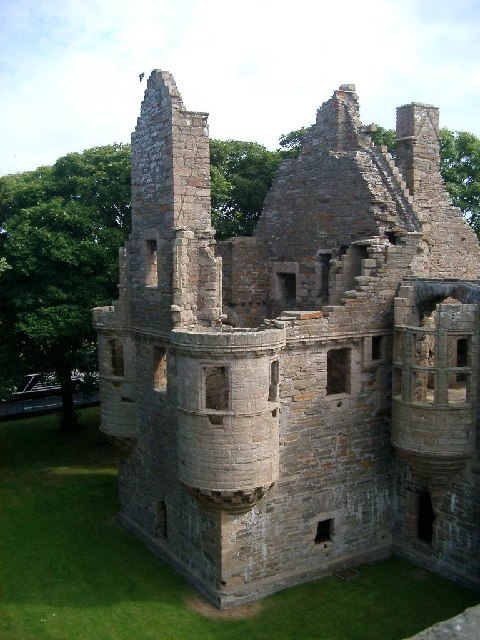
- The Earl's Palace

- Location within Orkney Islands

General information
- Status: in ruins
- Type: palace
- Architectural style: Renaissance
- Location: Kirkwall, Scotland
- Coordinates: 58°58′50″N 2°57′32″W
- Groundbreaking: 1607
- Owner: Historic Environment Scotland

The Earl's Palace is a ruined Renaissance-style palace near St Magnus's Cathedral in the centre of Kirkwall, Orkney, Scotland. Built by Patrick, Earl of Orkney, its construction began in 1607 and was largely undertaken via forced labour. Today, the ruins are open to the public.

== History ==
The palace was built after Patrick, 2nd Earl of Orkney, decided that the accommodation provided by the Bishop's Palace was inadequate for his needs. Lord Orkney is widely acknowledged to have been one of the most tyrannical noblemen in Scotland's history. He decided to extend the complex by building a new palace on the adjoining land. This was complicated by the fact he did not actually own this property. He quickly acquired it by fabricating charges of theft against the unfortunate owner, trying him and having him executed. Upon his imprisonment at Edinburgh in 1609, his bastard son Robert began a rebellion on his behalf and seized the palace, along with nearby St Magnus's Cathedral and Kirkwall Castle. An army led by the Earl of Caithness laid siege, and the Castle was destroyed. Lord Orkney and his son were later executed for treason.

After the Earl's death, the palace continued to be the residence of the Bishops of Orkney sporadically until 1688, when it became the property of the Crown, and fell into ruin in the 18th century.

== Today ==
The palace is currently in the possession of Historic Environment Scotland as a protected scheduled monument.

The palace and the nearby Bishop's Palace are closed to the public October 2023 - March 2024 during which time high level masonry inspections are being carried out as part of the building's conservation.

== Bibliography ==
- Simpson, W Douglas. Bishop's Palace and Earl's Palace. Historic Scotland. ISBN N/A.
