= Patrick Stewart, 2nd Earl of Orkney =

Scottish nobleman

Coat of arms of Earl Patrick. The first and fourth quarters show the Scottish royal arms debruised by a ribbon, a symbol of bastardy, while the second and third quarters show the arms of the Earldom of Orkney

Patrick Stewart, 2nd Earl of Orkney, Lord of Zetland (Note: "Zetland" is an archaic spelling of "Shetland".) (c. 1566 – 6 February 1615) was a Scottish nobleman, the son of Robert, Earl of Orkney, a bastard son of King James V. Infamous for his godless nature and tyrannical rule over the Scottish archipelagos of Orkney and Shetland, he was executed for treason in 1615.

== Career ==
Patrick was the second of five sons of Earl Robert and his wife Lady Jean Kennedy. On the death of his uncle Lord Robert (Note: This Lord Robert generally had "secundus" or "junior" appended to his name, in order to distinguish him from his brother.) in 1581, he was given the gift of the Priory of Whithorn. On the death of his elder brother Henry around 1588, he became heir to the Earldom of Orkney. Patrick spent some time with his brother-in-law Patrick Vans of Barnbarroch in Ayrshire. In March 1582 his father wrote to Barnbarroch discussing the possibility of sending him to Geneva for his education. The Earl asked Barnbarroch to send young Patrick to Kirkwall by the next available boat.

In his youth Patrick was a good friend of his cousin James VI; however, their relationship became strained in the 1590s after Patrick succeeded his father as Earl of Orkney. In June 1589 he wrote from Kirkwall to Patrick Vans of Barnbarroch with news of a pirate called Peterson who claimed to have a letter from Earl Robert to the Duke of Parma. Such a letter would be compromising to them, and Patrick hoped Barnbarroch could investigate and mitigate any danger to them. An early example of his rapacity occurs in 1594, when he was accused of spoiling a Danzig ship; however he was absolved of this crime. The same year he accused three of his younger brothers of conspiring to kill him, after he caught one of John's servitors with poison on him. The servitor was tortured and executed, along with Allison Balfour, a "witch" who supposedly aided in the conspiracy; the brothers, however, were later acquitted.

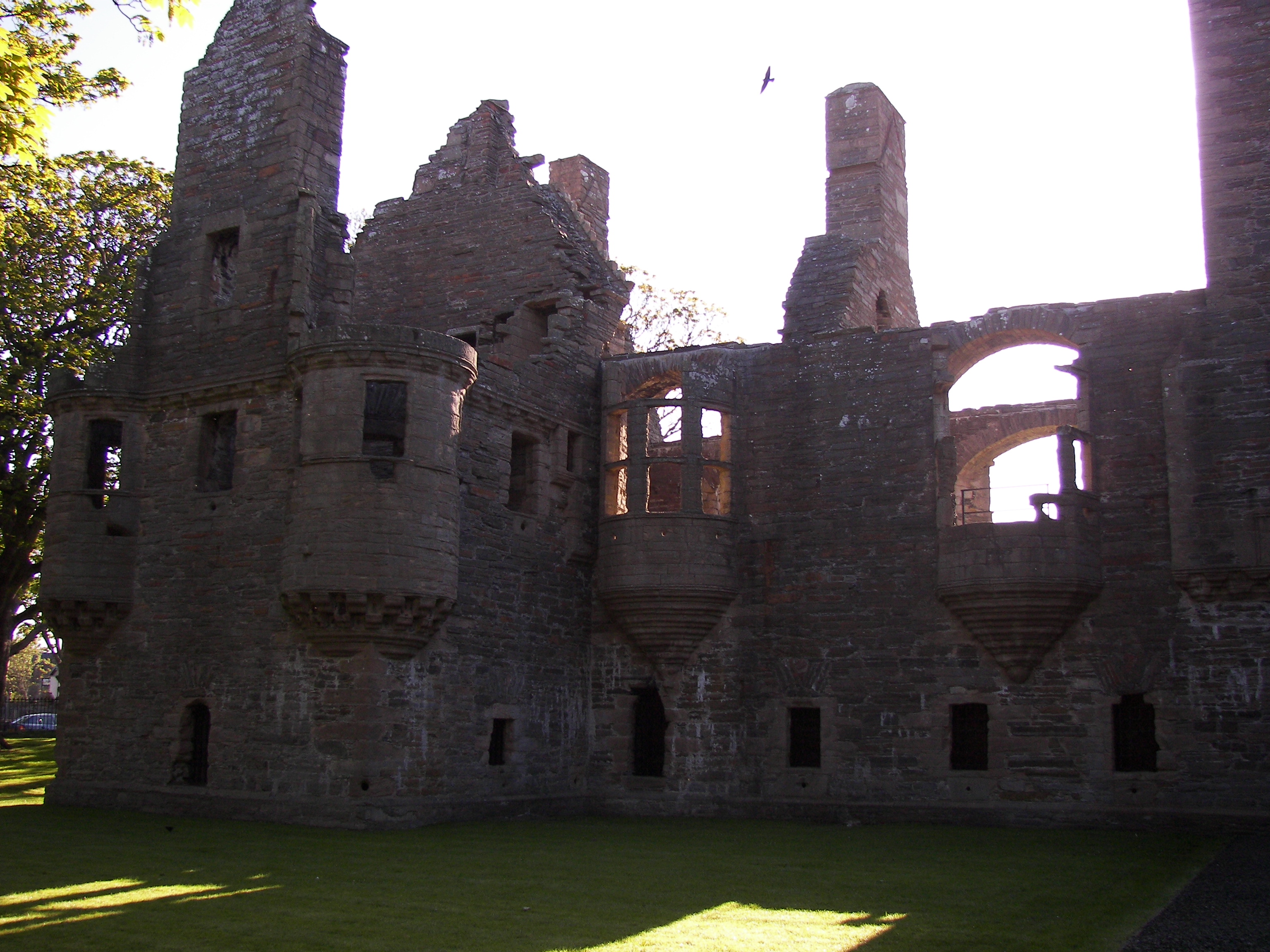
The ruins of the Earl's Palace

Patrick became a prominent figure at Court, and served as a "sewer" (assistant) to the King at the baptism of his son Prince Henry Frederick in 1594. He ruled Orkney and Shetland in the north of Scotland in the manner of an independent sovereign, severely oppressing the islanders and getting into massive debt. In 1599 he built Scalloway Castle on the Mainland of Shetland, partly to strengthen his power there against his half-uncle Laurence Bruce, who had been appointed Sheriff of Shetland by the deceased Earl Robert. Patrick also feuded with George Sinclair, the Earl of nearby Caithness. In March 1599, James VI ordered Patrick and George to furnish their strongholds against the possibility of an invasion by the exiled Earl of Bothwell. This scare was renewed in July 1601. In 1607 Earl Patrick began the construction of the Earl's Palace in Kirkwall, the capital of Orkney.

Patrick joined the King in a hunting trip in Teviotdale in the Scottish borders in March 1600. The hunting party was shadowed by an agent of the English border warden, who noted the Earl's presence.

After the Union of the Crowns, on 5 May 1603, Patrick accompanied Anne of Denmark to Linlithgow Palace and Stirling Castle. The visit ended in conflict between Anne and the keepers of her son Prince Henry.

Earl Patrick's financial mismanagement and his brutality against the local population led to him being summoned before the Privy Council in 1609, and then imprisoned, firstly in Edinburgh Castle and then in Dumbarton Castle.

== Rebellion and death ==
After Earl Patrick's imprisonment, he sent his illegitimate son Robert Stewart to raise a rebellion in Orkney in his favour. Robert seized the Palace of Birsay with thirty companions in May 1614, then occupied the Earl's Palace, the castle and St Magnus' Cathedral in Kirkwall. As many as 700 rebels subscribed to a band which claimed their action was restoring royal justice in Orkney under the direction of Robert Stewart during the Earl's absence. Robert was defeated by a force commanded by the Earl of Caithness at the end of September, after a five-week siege of the Earl's Palace. The Earl of Caithness battered the palace or castle with 140 cannon shots; he said the castle was so strong that some of his cannonballs had both broken like golf balls and split in two halves (cannone billets both brokkin lyk goulfe balls upoune the castelle and clovin in twa halffis). Twelve of Robert's men were hanged at the castle gate.

Robert was taken to Edinburgh, put on trial, and hanged with five others. Robert and his father denied they had planned the rebellion together, but Robert's accomplice, Patrick Halcro, insisted he had acted on Earl Patrick's instructions. Evidence was taken in Orkney from Margaret Buchanan, a servant who claimed she had read instructions for Halcro written by the Earl. She said that Halcro showed the paper to Robert, who tore it into pieces and they both told her it were better so, that it could do no hurt in time coming, and "the Earl of Orkney should not want his head for it". Robert's execution evoked much sympathy from the people, owing to his young age, around twenty-two, and his "tall stature and comlie countenance".

The trial of Earl Patrick followed that of his son. His titles were forfeited and he was sentenced to death, but his execution was postponed after a plea from the chaplains, who, finding him so ignorant he could barely recite the Lord's Prayer, wanted time to educate him and give him Communion. The execution eventually took place on 6 February 1615, when he was taken to the Mercat Cross in Edinburgh and beheaded.

== Marriage and marriage plan ==
In 1595 King James suggested the Earl's marriage to Emilia, a sister of Count Maurice of Nassau. An envoy, Colonel Stewart, proposed the plan to the States to cement a league between Scotland and the Netherlands, but objections included the Earl's doubtful title to Orkney and Shetland, and that Emilia was unwilling to dwell so far from her home and family. Patrick had partly funded the Colonel's mission, which was resented by the Scottish resident ambassador-lieger and consul to the States General, Robert Denniston.

Patrick instead married Margaret Livingstone, the wealthy widow of Sir Lewis Bellenden and a daughter of the Lord Livingston and Agnes Fleming on 19 August 1596. Margaret was a gentlewoman in the households of Anne of Denmark and Prince Henry. After squandering her fortune, Patrick left her to die in poverty. They had no children, though Patrick did have several bastards:

- Robert Stewart, son of Marjorie Sinclair (who was present with her son at the siege of Kirkwall and was wounded in the hand)
- Mary Stewart
- Catherine Stewart, married John Sinclair of Ulbster

== Ancestors ==
Ancestors of Patrick Stewart, 2nd Earl of Orkney

16. James III, King of Scots
8. James IV, King of Scots
17. Margaret of Denmark
4. James V, King of Scots
18. Henry VII, King of England
9. Margaret Tudor
19. Elizabeth of York
2. Robert, Earl of Orkney, Lord of Zetland
20. Sir John Elphinstone of that Ilk and of Pittendreich
10. Alexander, Lord Elphinstone
5. The Hon. Euphemia Elphinstone
11. Elizabeth Barlow
1. Patrick, Earl of Orkney, Lord of Zetland
24. David, Earl of Cassilis, Lord Kennedy
12. Gilbert, Earl of Cassilis, Lord Kennedy
25. The Hon. Agnes Borthwick
6. Gilbert, Earl of Cassilis, Lord Kennedy
26. Archibald, Earl of Argyll, Lord Campbell and Lorne
13. Lady Isabella Campbell
27. Lady Elizabeth Stewart
3. Lady Jean Kennedy
14. Alexander Kennedy of Bargeny
7. Margaret Kennedy

Peerage of Scotland
Preceded by Robert Stewart	Earl of Orkney; 1593–1614	Succeeded by Forfeit
