= Euphemia Elphinstone =

Mother of one of James V's illegitimate sons

Euphemia Elphinstone (also written Euphame or Eupheme; born by about 1514) was a Scottish noblewoman who had a relationship with James V of Scotland and subsequently married John Bruce of Cultmalindie.

== Career ==
She was a daughter of Alexander Elphinstone, 1st Lord Elphinstone and Elizabeth Barlow or Barlay (c. 1476 – unknown ), an English woman who served as maid of honour to Margaret Tudor. The family hailed from Elphinstone near Stirling. Her brother Alexander, Lord Elphinstone, died at Edinburgh following the Battle of Pinkie Cleugh. An Elphinstone family source reports that Euphemia was born on 11 May 1509. The source seems to have been compiled by Alexander Elphinstone, 6th Lord Elphinstone, between 1648 and 1654.

A royal charter issued on 31 August 1536 identifies Robert Stewart, 1st Earl of Orkney, as a natural son born to the king and Euphemia. The historian Peter D. Anderson dates Robert's birth to the spring of 1533. Little or nothing is known about the relation of Euphemia and the king.

Euphemia entered into a marriage contract with John Bruce of Cultmalindie on 13 April 1540. The contract required Bruce to marry her "in all goodly haste." They had several children, including Laurence Bruce, although the number, identities and birth dates assigned to their children vary among later genealogical accounts.

No firm evidence for Euphemia's death date has been identified.

== Orkney and Shetland connections ==
Her children and descendants were significant in the history of the Shetland Islands and Orkney Islands. Laurence Bruce and Robert Stewart and their families were entwined in the Shetland Islands. Laurence Bruce of Cultmalindie was appointed Sheriff by his half-brother, Robert Stewart, 1st Earl of Orkney. He began building Muness Castle in 1598.

According to legend, many people in the Shetland Islands are descended from Euphemia Elphinstone; in particular, those named Bruce are supposed to be descended from her children by John Bruce.
