= Robert Stewart, 1st Earl of Orkney =

Recognised illegitimate son of James V, King of Scotland

Robert Stewart, Earl of Orkney
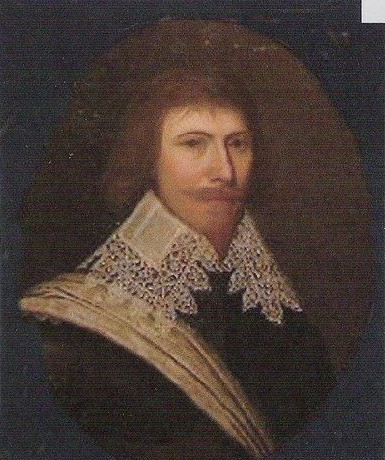

Personal details
- Born: c. 1533 Scotland
- Died: February 4, 1593 Palace of the Yards, Kirkwall, Orkney, Scotland
- Resting place: Kirkwall, Orkney, Scotland
- Spouse: Lady Jean Kennedy (m. 1561)
- Children: Mary; Jean; William of Egilsay; Henry; Patrick Stewart, 2nd Earl of Orkney; John Stewart, Earl of Carrick; Sir Robert Stewart of Middleton; Sir James Stewart of Eday and Tullos; Elizabeth; Barbara; Illegitimate: Christian; Edward; Mary
- Parent(s): James V of Scotland (father); Euphemia Elphinstone (mother)

Robert Stewart, 1st Earl of Orkney and Lord of Zetland (Shetland) (spring of 1533 – 4 February 1593) was a recognised illegitimate son of James V, King of Scotland, and his mistress Eupheme Elphinstone. Robert Stewart was half-brother to Mary, Queen of Scots and uncle to James VI and I of Scotland and England.

== Biography ==
Coat of arms of Robert Stewart as the 1st Earl of Orkney. The first and fourth quarters show the Scottish royal arms debruised by a ribbon, a symbol of bastardy, while the second and third quarters show the arms of the Earldom of Orkney

In 1539 Robert Stewart was made Commendator of Holyrood Abbey, and Commendator of Charlieu Abbey in France by 1557. Clothes for "lord Robert of Halyrudhous" and his brothers were made by the king's tailor, Thomas Arthur.

In 1550, after the conclusion of the war known the Rough Wooing, he accompanied his step-mother Mary of Guise on a visit to the French court. In July 1553, his sister Lady Jean Stewart was contracted to marry Archibald Campbell, 5th Earl of Argyll. Her cash dowry of 5,000 merks was to be paid by Mary of Guise and her brothers, the Commendators of Kelso, Holyrood, and Coldingham.

During the Reformation Crisis, on 9 February 1560 he testified against the Hamiltons, the Duke of Châtellerault and Earl of Arran, and the Protestant Lords of the Congregation to James MacGill and John Bellenden of Auchnoule. They were collecting evidence for Henri Cleutin and Jacques de la Brosse, the French advisors of Mary of Guise who planned to have the Hamiltons charged with treason against his half-sister, Mary, Queen of Scots and France. Robert himself had signed some of the letters that were to be cited as evidence.

Mary, Queen of Scots returned to Scotland on 19 August 1561, arriving unexpectedly at Leith at 10 o'clock in the morning with her entourage of 60 companions in two galleys. Lord Robert welcomed her at Holyrood Palace. Robert, his half-brother Lord John, the Marquis of Elbeuf and others performed at the sands of Leith in a tournament in December 1561. There was "running at the ring" with two teams of six men, Robert's team dressed as women, the other as exotic foreigners in strange masquing garments. Robert's team were the winners. The ambassador of Savoy, Monsieur de Moret, watched the tournament at Leith, and he was lodged in Lord Robert's house at Holyrood. There was a similar tournament in costume in August 1594 at the baptism of Prince Henry at Stirling Castle. Again, in March 1565, Robert Stewart took part in running at the ring at the sands of Leith, and the contestants included a newcomer at court Lord Darnley.

In October 1563, Queen Mary sent Robert and his two half-brothers Moray and Lord Coldingham north to Inverness to hold justice courts. Two women accused of withcraft were burnt.

Robert Stewart was knighted as Sir Robert Stewart of Strathdon on 15 May 1565, as part of marriage celebrations of Mary, Queen of Scots and Lord Darnley. In 1581 he was made Earl of Orkney by James VI, the first Earl in a second creation of the Earldom of Orkney. The new earldom replaced a short-lived Dukedom of Orkney, which had been awarded in 1567 by Mary, Queen of Scots, to her notorious third husband James Hepburn, 4th Earl of Bothwell. This dukedom was forfeit later that same year after Mary was forced to abdicate and Bothwell was charged with treason. Prior to this dukedom there had existed an Earldom of Orkney that was surrendered in 1470 by William Sinclair, 3rd Earl of Orkney

== Family ==
On 13 or 14 December 1561 Robert Stewart married Lady Jean Kennedy, daughter of Gilbert Kennedy, 3rd Earl of Cassillis, and Margaret Kennedy. The English diplomat Thomas Randolph wrote that "Lord Robert consumethe with love for Cassillis' sister". At this time Lord Robert had a house near Holyrood Palace, but the marriage took place at the house of one of her family friends. Their children included:

- Mary, who married Patrick Gray, 6th Lord Gray (b. late 1562)
- Jean, who married Patrick Leslie, 1st Lord Lindores (b. 1563?)
- William of Egilsay (1564-1630)
- Henry, who became Master of Orkney (b. February 1565 - 1590)
- Patrick (1565/66 - 6 February 1615), who inherited the title Earl of Orkney and married Margaret Livingstone.
- John Stewart, who became Earl of Carrick and married Elizabeth Howard
- Robert, was knighted and known as Sir Robert Stewart of Middleton. Imprisoned for debt in London in 1606.
- James, was knighted and known as Sir James Stewart of Eday and Tullos, and married Margaret Lyon
- Elizabeth, who married James Sinclair of Murkle in Caithness (becoming the mother-in-law of John MacKay, Laird of Strathy in Strathnaver)
- Barbara, who married Hugh Halcro of Halcro

Robert Stewart also had a number of illegitimate children with several mistresses.

- Christian Stewart, who married John Mowat of Hugoland
- Edward Stewart
- Mary Stewart

== Ancestors ==
Ancestors of Robert Stewart, 1st Earl of Orkney

8. James III of Scotland
4. James IV of Scotland
9. Margaret of Denmark
2. James V of Scotland
10. Henry VII of England
5. Margaret Tudor
11. Elizabeth of York
1. Robert Stewart, 1st Earl of Orkney
12. Sir John Elphinstone of that Ilk and of Pittendreich
6. Alexander Elphinstone, 1st Lord Elphinstone
13. Euphemia
3. Euphemia Elphinstone
14. John Barlow
7. Elizabeth Barlow
15. Christian Barley

== Notes ==
Peerage of Scotland
| Preceded by Recreated earldom | Earl of Orkney; 1581–1593 | Succeeded by Patrick Stewart |
