= Patrick Bellenden of Stenhouse =

Patrick Bellenden of Stenhouse (1533–1607) was a Scottish landowner and Sheriff of Orkney. He was involved in the murder of David Rizzio in March 1566 and threatened Mary, Queen of Scots with a pistol in her bed chamber at Holyrood Palace.

== Family background ==
He was a younger son of Thomas Bellenden of Auchnoule and Agnes Forrester. The family name is sometimes spelled "Ballentyne". His older brother was the Justice Clerk, John Bellenden. He married Katherine Kennedy in Perth in April 1563. She was the widow of Henry Sinclair of Strom and Brough and may have been a daughter of Hugh Kennedy of Girvanmains. John Bellenden's wife was Hugh's daughter Barbara Kennedy.

The family had links to Orkney, and Patrick obtained lands in the parish of Stenness in July 1563. He was described as the laird of Stenhouse or Stanehouse. He also obtained property in the parish of Evie. In 1565, he became Sheriff (or Sheriff Depute) of Orkney.

Patrick Bellenden took on a role as a factor or administrator for George Bellenden, chantor of Glasgow and vicar of Dunrossness in Shetland. He would receive income from the ecclesiastical property from Olave Sinclair of Havera and pass it on to his brother John Bellenden, who acted as George Bellenden's "procurator general". He also had role in connection with crown revenue as "clerk of the coquet" for Edinburgh, connected with customs. This sometimes paid him a fee via the "thirds of benefices".

== David Rizzio ==
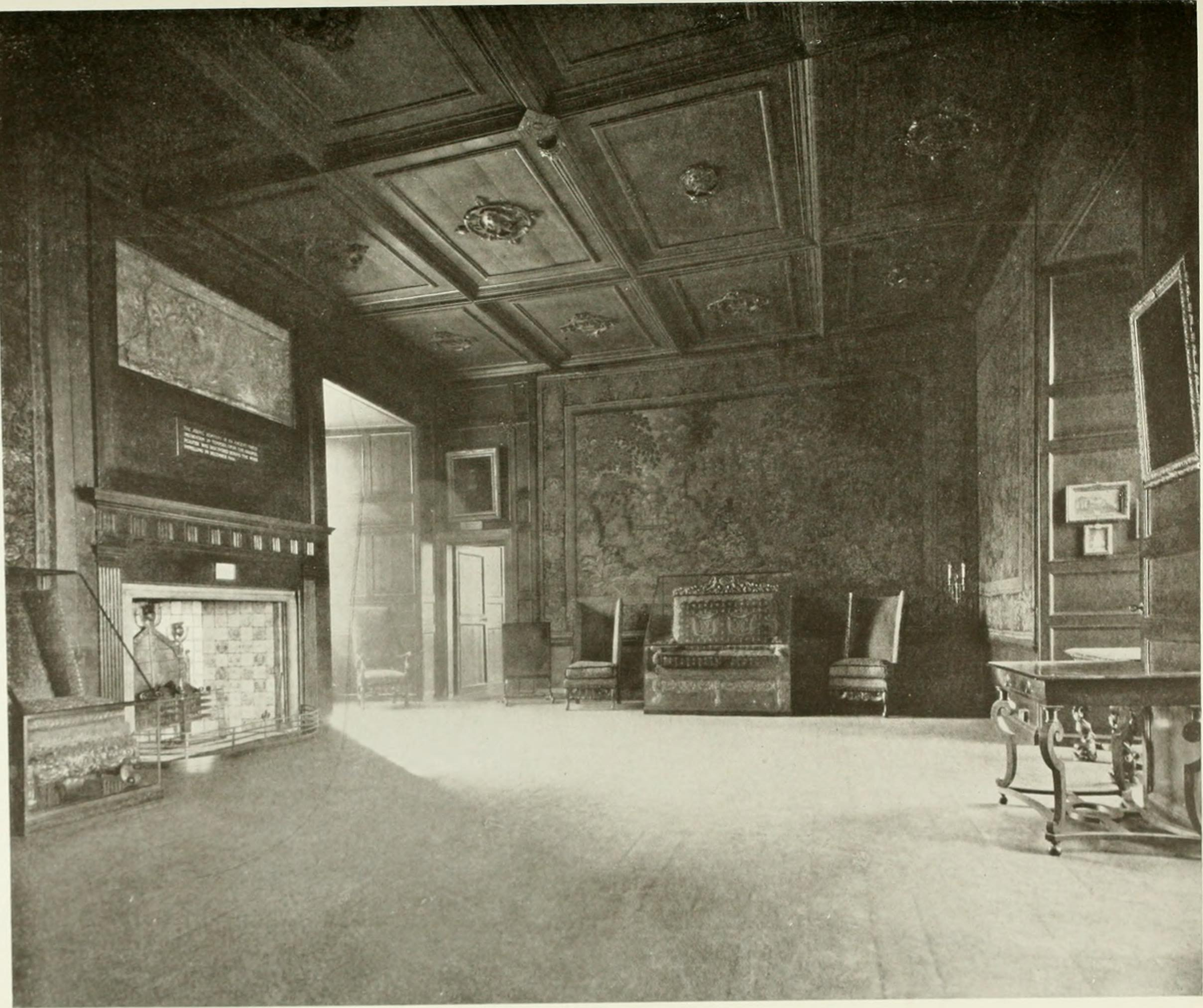
Patrick Bellenden threatened Mary, Queen of Scots, with a pistol or a dagger in her apartment in Holyrood Palace

Several legal records mention the involvement of Patrick Bellenden in the murder of David Rizzio at Holyrood on 9 March 1566. A narrative account rapidly compiled by two English officials, Thomas Randolph and the Earl of Bedford, mentions that he threatened Mary, Queen of Scots, with a pistol called a "dagge". They wrote that Mary herself had said this:

one Patricke Balentine brother to the Justice Clerke, who also her Grace saythe offered a dagge agaynste her belly with the cocke downe.

At the same time, Andrew Ker of Faldonside drew his dagger and threatened the queen. Both Ker and Bellenden were said to have entered the Queen's apartments with Lord Darnley, whose rooms were below Mary's in the tower built by her father James V of Scotland. However, Randolph and Bedford noted some uncertainty. They wrote that Lord Ruthven would not confirm the "verity" of what they heard about Ker and Bellenden, and "assured us of the contrary".

Other sources say it was Bellenden who drew his dagger. Anthony Standen, a servant of Darnley, later wrote that he was present and disarmed Patrick Bellenden who held a dagger to Mary's left side. Standen struggled with Bellenden and the Earl of Morton thrust him out of the chamber. Standen wrote that another man held a snaphance pistol "to her belly" which failed to fire. Standen noted that Patrick was a servant of Lord Ruthven.

According to Lord Herries' Memoirs, Ker's pistol refused to fire and Mary spoke to Darnley and "William Stainley" following the birth of Prince James mentioning that Ker's pistol might have injured her and her child. "Stainley" may be identified as Standen, or an English squire who had joined him in Darnley's entourage. Retha Warnicke finds this reported conversation unlikely. Antonia Fraser suggests that both Bellenden and Ker brandished pistols in the royal presence. Lord Herries' Memoirs mistakenly claims that Bellenden was caught and executed with Henry Yair.

== Declared rebel ==
Patrick Bellenden was declared a rebel and his property assigned to Gilbert Kennedy. His salaried office as clerk of the customs of Edinburgh was given to the queen's embroiderer, Pierre Veray or Oudry. Bellenden seems to have tried to fortify himself in Kirkwall, banding with William Moodie and others against Robert Stewart, 1st Earl of Orkney. Robert Stewart had resisted the intruders at Holyrood in March 1566.

According to a later legal memorandum, "it fortunit hym to be present quhen umquhill David Richeo wes slane at the command of the umquhill Kinge of good memorye", and consequently Patrick Bellenden was driven from Scotland and from Orkney by the "extreme pursuit" of Gilbert Balfour acting as Mary's commissioner. Bellenden was however included in a general remission or pardon made to many of those involved in Rizzio's murder which Mary issued as a privy seal letter from Stirling Castle on Christmas Eve 1566. A further remission was granted to Patrick Bellenden and his servants (including Magnus Halcro of Burgh) on 12 January 1567. They were described as assistants of Lord Ruthven and complicit in the events at Holyrood in March 1566. He was reinstated as clerk of the coquet (with his brother John) in September 1567.

== Later life ==
Some of Patrick's letters to his brother John Bellenden survive. In July 1569, he wrote from Dalquharran Castle in Ayrshire, signing as "P. Bellenden of Stenhous". Subsequently, Patrick became known as the "laird of Evie".

He was in conflict with Robert Stewart, 1st Earl of Orkney in 1568. He formed a "band" with other enemies of the earl, and was able to stir up trouble for the earl with Regent Moray at the Scottish royal court. This feud did not subside, and to some extent Bellenden had the support of Regent Morton.

Bellenden had a stepson, Hew Sinclair, a son of Henry Sinclair of Strom and Katherine Kennedy. There was a dispute over Hew Sinclair's rights to the properties of Evie, Aikerness (the family home), and Birstane. Bellenden made Hew Sinclair renounce his rights in 1575 and Hew challenged this in December 1577.

In 1587 his son Patrick and his nephew Lewis Bellenden were appointed as Clerks of the Coquet in Edinburgh, the office forfeited in 1566. In December, Patrick Bellenden was included in a commission with Lewis Bellenden, as Justice Clerk, and John Maitland of Thirlestane to investigate Lord Robert and James Stewart's offences against James Irvine of Saba, formerly the Lawman of Orkney.

A record from 1605 mentions that he was married to Katherine Wilson, and was 72 years old. Patrick Stewart, 2nd Earl of Orkney had besieged his home at "Stanehouse", tortured his eldest son with the "boot" and imprisoned another son, Adam Bothwell, in Kirkwall. Patrick had been carried out of his house in a "wand" (wicker) bed.

He died on 20 June 1607 in a house on Edinburgh's Canongate. His will was confirmed in July. He wished to buried next to his father in Holyrood Abbey. Katherine Wilson, his widow, a daughter of Katherine Johnston, was his executor. He had two daughters called Margaret Bellenden.
