= William Bruce of Symbister =

Scottish landowner

William Bruce of Symbister and Sumburgh (died 1624) was a Scottish landowner.

William Bruce was a relation of Laurence Bruce of Cultmalindie, Perthshire, who built Muness Castle on Unst. William Bruce's descendants built Symbister House at Symbister on Whalsay.

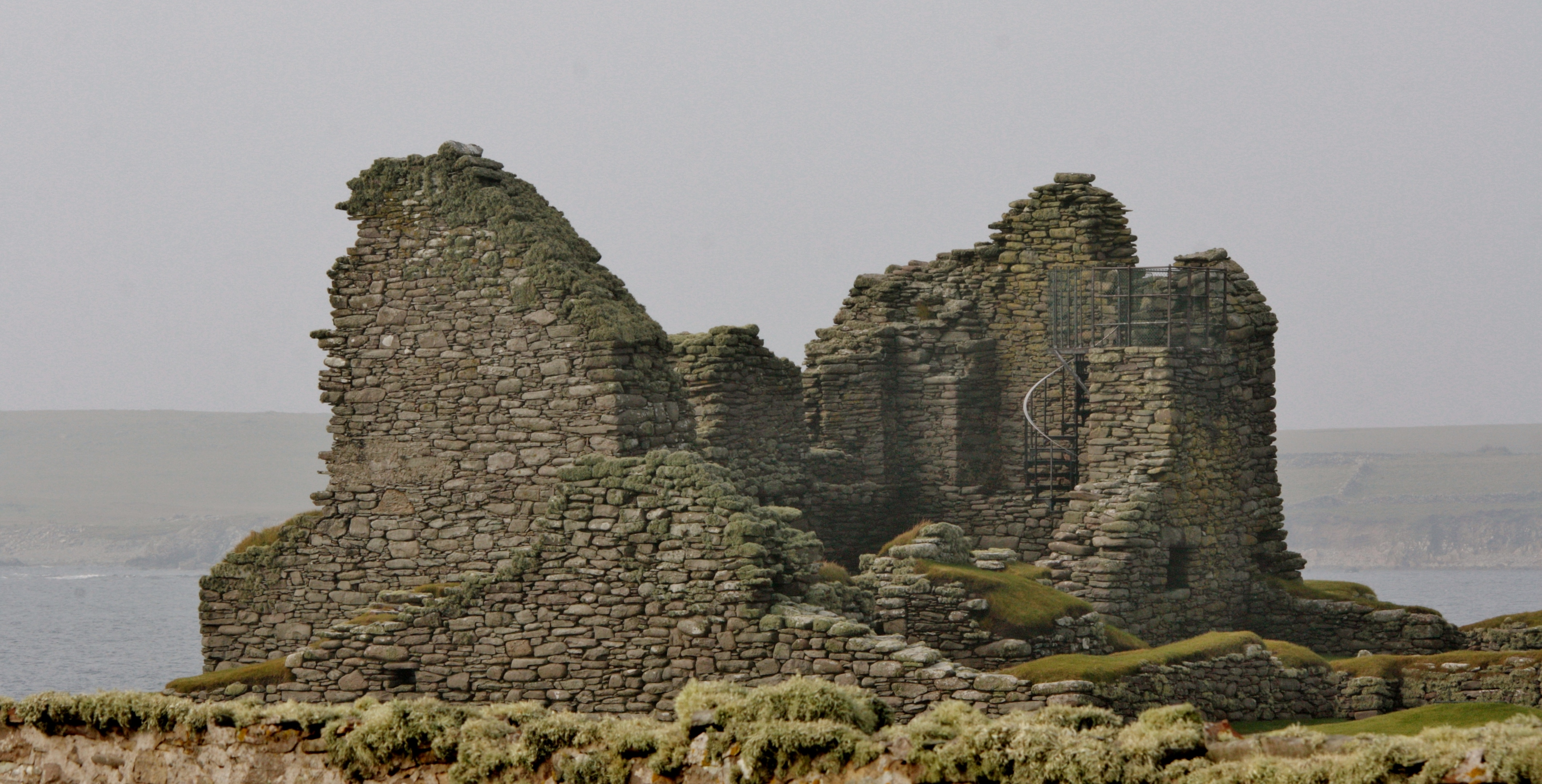
William Bruce and Margaret Stewart were tenants of the house at Jarlshof

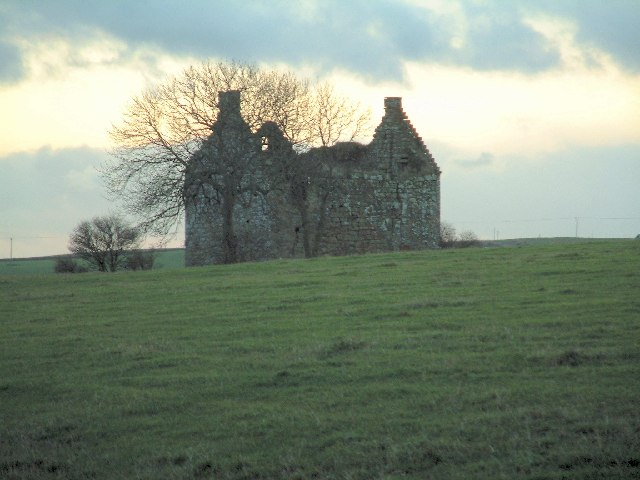
Pittarthie Castle was built by William Bruce's descendants in Fife

Lawrence Bruce was appointed "Foud" or Sheriff of Shetland in 1571, an administrator for his half-brother, the Earl of Orkney. William Bruce came to Shetland to work as his deputy or clerk.

Alexander Bruce of Cultmalindie married Jean Oliphant, a daughter of Lord Oliphant.

William Bruce married Marjorie or Margaret Stewart (died 1607), a daughter of John Stewart, Commendator of Coldingham and Jean Hepburn.

Marjorie Stewart's first husband was William Sinclair of Underhoull on Unst. He was a son of Olave Sinclair of Havera and Brow, the previous Foud of Shetland, who died in 1570. Another son of the Foud, Matthew Sinclair of Ness, was murdered in 1602.

William Bruce obtained lands at Sumburgh and Jarlshof in 1592. His wife Margaret Stewart died on 25 November 1607. Her will details their farm stock at Sumburgh and Symbister, and the wages owed to their farm workers and domestic servants.

His second wife was Isobella Spens, from a Fife family, a relation of the diplomat James Spens of Wormiston. He went to live in Fife in later life.

He died in 1624 was buried at Crail where his churchyard monument survives.

Andrew Bruce, a son of Isobella Spens, inherited his lands in Fife, and his half brother Robert Bruce inherited Symbister. Andrew Bruce bought an estate called Pittarthie near Dunino and married Elizabeth Bruce, a daughter of William Bruce of Earlshall.
