= David Scollay =

David Scollay of Tofts was a merchant burgess of Kirkwall in Orkney, Provost of Kirkwall in 1586, and Sheriff Depute of Orkney. He was a son of Duncan Scollay or Scolla in Kirkwall.

== The Queen's crop in Orkney ==
Mary, Queen of Scots was paid an annual feudal rent from the lands of Orkney in farm produce, including butter and fish oil. David Scollay bought some the produce collected, known as the "crop" and the "victual", and the rest was shipped to Leith from Kirkwall. The money was used to fund the household of Mary, Queen of Scots, paying for her wine and the wages of her servants like David Rizzio and Servais de Condé. Scollay acted as a collector of this revenue and also bought some of the produce for resale.

In May 1562, David Scollay bought £305 Scots worth of the victual, and in June, with an administrator Olave Sinclair, bought a further portion for £295 Scots. One of Scollay's payments was made by another merchant, John Irvine. Scollay also bought a quantity of Orkney bere barley from the Comptroller of Scotland, John Wishart of Pitarrow. Scollay's agent for this latter payment was John Hart in the Canongate. Hart and Scollay also bought dairy produce known as "fat goods" worth £408 Scots.

== Servant of the Earl of Orkney ==
David Scollay received a fee as a servant of Robert Stewart, 1st Earl of Orkney according to the Earl's will. In 1588, as a supporter of the Earl, he was involved in a demonstration in Kirkwall against Patrick Bellenden of Evie, the King's Lieutenant in Orkney. In June 1589, David Scollay planned a voyage to Shetland, and made a document at North Strynie (Stronsay) leaving his lands to his brother Edward and son James, if he did not return. Edward Scollay of Strynie was Sheriff Depute of Shetland in 1608.
