= Noltland Castle =

Castle on the island of Westray in the Orkney Islands of Scotland

Coordinates: 59.3207°N 3.0044°W

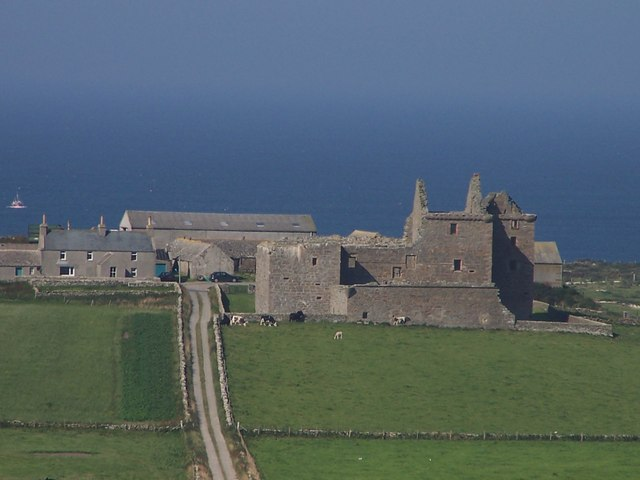
Noltland Castle

Noltland Castle is located near Pierowall on the island of Westray in the Orkney Islands of Scotland. It dates mainly to the later 16th century, although it was never fully completed. The castle is protected as a scheduled monument.

== History ==
In 1560, Adam Bothwell, Bishop of Orkney, granted the lands of Noltland to his brother-in-law Gilbert Balfour, who built the castle. Balfour was Master of the Royal Household to Mary, Queen of Scots, and was involved in the plot to kill her husband, Henry Stuart, Lord Darnley. After Mary's deposition and exile, he continued to support the queen. Noltland was seized by Robert Stewart, 1st Earl of Orkney, an opponent of Mary's supporters, but he was forced to hand it back to Balfour in the early 1570s. Balfour was executed in Sweden in 1576.

Ownership of the castle passed to Andrew Balfour of Montquhanie. In 1598, the castle was seized by Patrick Stewart, 2nd Earl of Orkney. By 1606, the castle had been restored to the Balfours, and it was sold to Sir John Arnot, Provost of Edinburgh, who later became Sheriff of Orkney.

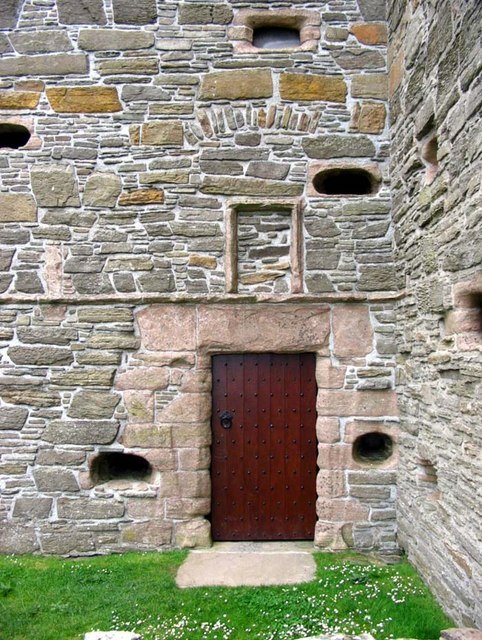
Doorway and shot holes

During the Wars of the Three Kingdoms in 1650, Royalist officers occupied the castle after their defeat at the Battle of Carbisdale. Local Covenanters captured and burned the castle. By 1881, it was described as a ruin, and was given into state care by the Balfour family in 1911. it is now maintained by Historic Environment Scotland.

== Description ==
The castle is built in the Z-plan form, comprising a rectangular main block with towers at opposite corners. A courtyard was added to the south in the 17th century. The castle is notable for its defensive architecture, unusual for the period, including a large number of shot holes. The large staircase has been compared to the stair at Fyvie Castle in Aberdeenshire.
