= Peerie Bard =

Mousa light station
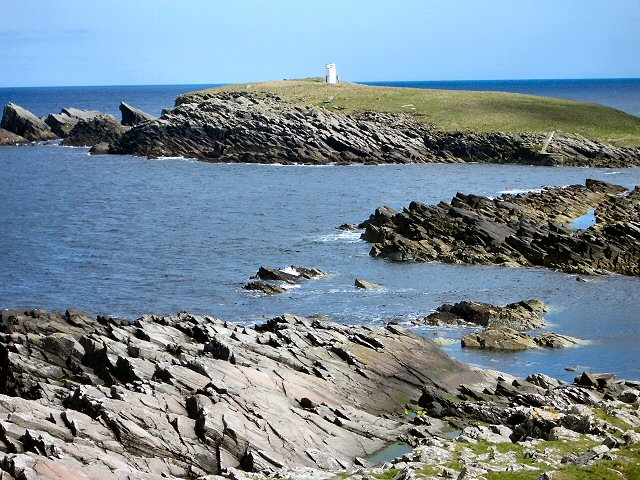
- Eastern tip of Mousa
- Location: Peerie Bard; Mousa; Shetland; Scotland; United Kingdom
- Coordinates: 59.997108°N 1.157808°W

Tower
- Constructed: 1951 (first)
- Foundation: concrete base
- Construction: metal skeletal tower
- Height: 6 metres (20 ft)
- Shape: quadrangular tower covered by aluminium panels with light on the top
- Markings: white tower
- Power source: solar power
- Operator: Mousa Nature Reserve

Light
- First lit: 2000 (current)
- Deactivated: 2000 (first)
- Focal height: 20 metres (66 ft)
- Range: 10 nmi (19 km; 12 mi)
- Characteristic: Fl W 3s.

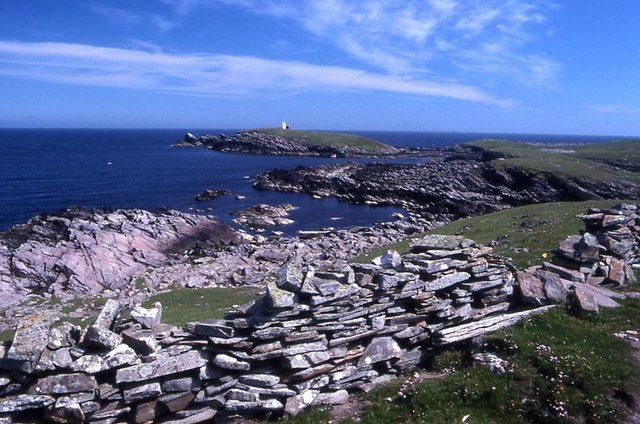
The east coast of Mousa towards the Peerie Bard.

Perie Bard is one of the Shetland Islands. It is a small islet off the east coast of the island of Mousa.

Although named 'Perie Bard' on OS Maps, the name used in Shetland is "Peerie Bard".

The name is derived from the Shetland dialect words 'Peerie', meaning small, and 'Bard', meaning steep headland. The Muckle Bard, or large steep headland, is located on neighbouring Mousa.

The Mousa Lighthouse is located on the Peerie Bard. The lighthouse was first lit in 1951 and replaced one which had previously been located on the nearby headland of Noness

== See also ==
- List of lighthouses in Scotland
- List of Northern Lighthouse Board lighthouses
