= Andrew Balfour of Montquhanie =

Scottish landowner

Andrew Balfour of Montquhanie (died 1615) was a Scottish landowner.

== Career ==
He was a son of Michael Balfour of Montquhanie and Mariota Adamson, a daughter of Patrick Adamson, Archbishop of St Andrews. Michael Balfour took some of jewels of Mary, Queen of Scots from William Kirkcaldy of Grange as a pledge for a loan. He surrendered nine great rubies and fourteen great pearls to the English commander William Drury at Leith after the "lang siege" of Edinburgh Castle in 1573. Unlike the other supporters of Mary who made similar loans to Grange, Michael Balfour charged him interest.

Andrew Balfour's home was at Montquhanie or Montquhany in Kilmany in Fife, Scotland, near Craill. The family also had a house on Market Street in St Andrews. He also inherited lands in Orkney from his father, which were held from the Earl of Orkney as feudal landlord. In his father's lifetime, he was known as Andrew Balfour of Strathure and Franktenementer of Montquhanie.

Andrew Balfour was knighted in August 1594 at the baptism of Prince Henry at Stirling Castle.

His father inherited Noltland Castle and its lands in 1588 from Archibald Balfour of Westray and transferred the property to his son in 1590. The castle had been built by Gilbert Balfour. Andrew Balfour added a stone with his arms and initials "AB", dated 1597, to Montquhanie Castle.

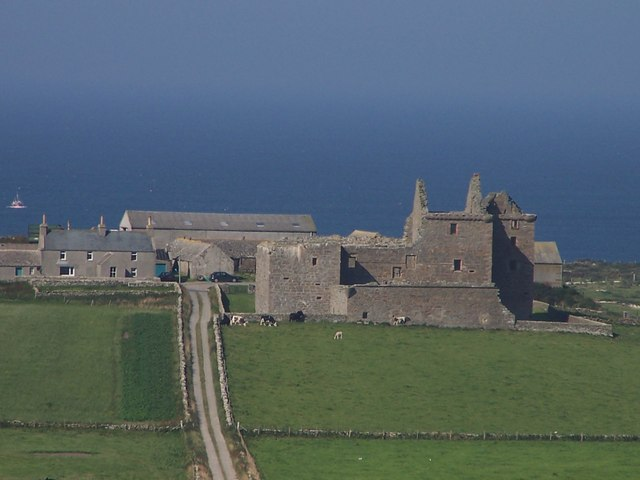
The Mains of Noltland on Westray

In 1597, in his father's lifetime, Andrew Balfour was the feuar of the Orkney lands on Westray and Faray. Balfour complained to the Privy Council that Patrick Stewart, 2nd Earl of Orkney had menaced his tenants on Westray, and insisted they should not recognise Balfour's jurisdiction and courts. The Earl induced John Dischingtoun, Commissariat of Orkney, to fine his father, Michael Balfour, and subsequently confiscated his goods on the Mains of Westray at Noltland.

The Balfours had right of "wrack and wraith" on the coast which allowed them to profit from beached whales. The Earl of Orkney had taken 29 beached whales worth £3000 Scots which Andrew Balfour considered were his. In November 1597 the Earl's men took the cereal crops from the cornyards of Westray and Papa Westray, and in the spring took the livestock from the Mains of Noltland. In November 1598 the Earl's brother, William Stewart, besieged Michael Balfour in the house of George Balfour, Prior of the Charterhouse of Perth, on Westray.

He died in 1615.

== Marriage ==
Andrew Balfour married Margaret or Mary Melville, a daughter of James Melville of Halhill and Christian Boswell, a daughter of David Boswell of Balmuto.
