= Laurence Bruce =

Scottish landowner

Laurence Bruce of Cultmalindie (20 January 1547 – August 1617) was a Scottish landowner and factor to the Earl of Orkney. He features in a number of traditional stories of Shetland.

== Background ==
He was the son of John Bruce of Cultmalindie and Euphemia Elphinstone. Easter Cultmalindie is a small hamlet or "fermtoun" in Tibbermore parish, Perthshire, Scotland.

The Bruces of Cultmalindie were a minor branch of the Bruce family in Scotland, and were descendants of Robert the Bruce, King of Scotland (1306-1329). Laurence Bruce was the half brother of Robert Stewart, 1st Earl of Orkney. Earl Robert was the recognized illegitimate son of James V, King of Scotland, and Eupheme Elphinstone.

== Shetland and Muness ==
About 1571 Laurence Bruce was appointed sheriff or tacksman of the Foudry of Shetland by Earl Robert. The foud and foudry was a Norn-Scottish office similar to a bailiff. The word is derived from the Norse term fogde. The foud returned customs and rents due the crown. By April 1573, Bruce was "undoubted foud, sheriff depute, and chamberlain of Shetland", displacing the elderly Olave Sinclair.

As foud in May 1574, he licensed two English ship, the Michael and Minion of Southampton to trade in Shetland. However, Earl Robert captured the ships and their cargo.

Accompanied by his nephew William Bruce of Crail (son of his full-brother Robert Bruce: although he may have been a son of Laurence) and other officials and armed men, Laurence Bruce moved to his new domain and set up his seat on the island of Unst. Once there he rapidly became unpopular due to his oppressive and corrupt rule. For example, it was alleged that he took bribes and that he had altered the official weights and measures to enhance the revenues of Earl Robert. For almost 30 years, farmers on Bressay had used a weight for butter called a "bismeyr" made with Olave Sinclair's consent by William Urving of Trondra. Bruce introduced a new larger "bismeyr".

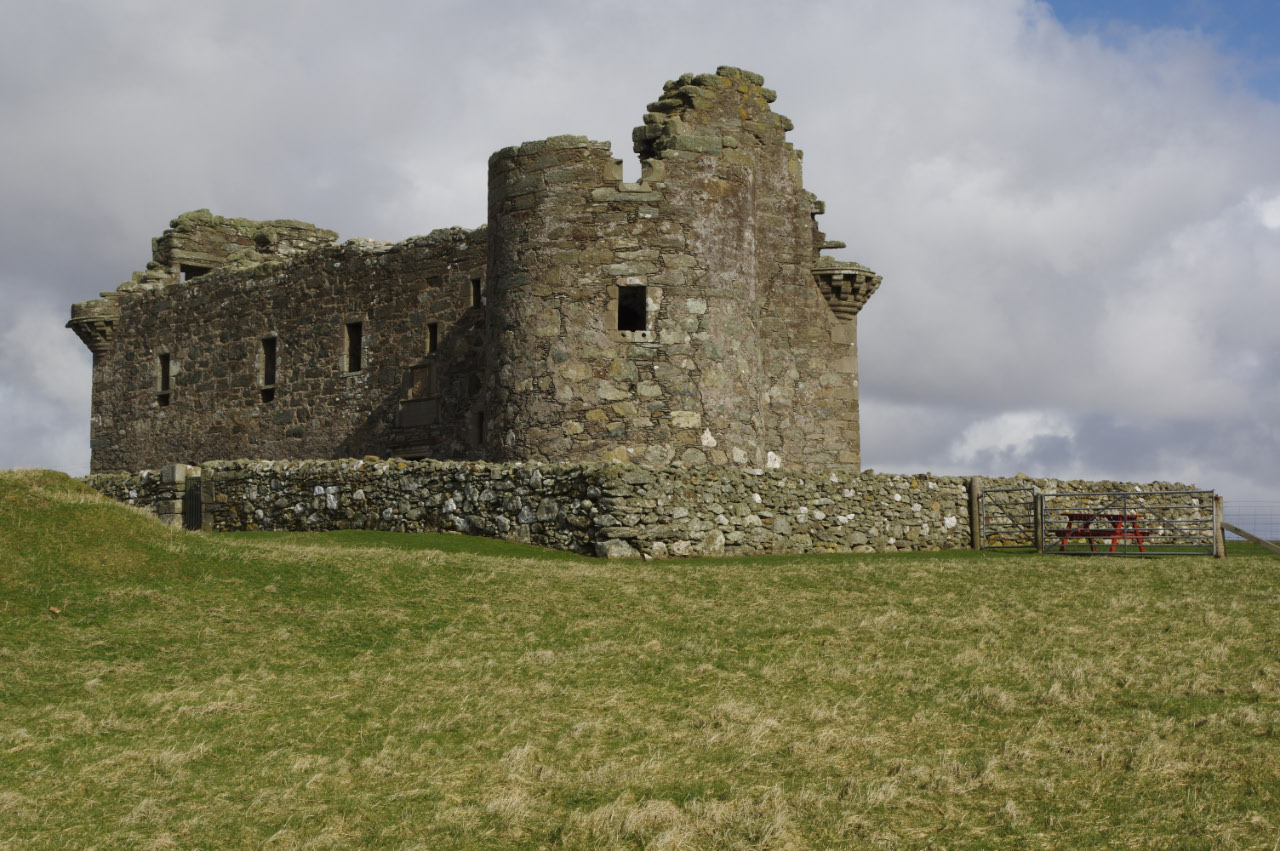
Laurence Bruce built Muness Castle.

Bruce was made admiral depute of Orkney and Shetland. His armed men felt free to seize control of ships and to billet themselves in the homes of the local people.

Evidently Laurence Bruce helped himself to the local women, and is believed to have fathered approximately twenty-four illegitimate children beyond his ten legitimate children by his wives Helen Kennedy, daughter of Hugh Kennedy of Girvanmains and Janet Stewart, and Elizabeth Gray, daughter of Patrick, Lord Gray and Marion Ogilvy. Escalating conflict with the local Shetland Islanders resulted in a petition being sent to the royal court in Edinburgh. In response, a royal commission, the "Mudy commission", travelled to Shetland and in February 1577 took evidence from 700 male Shetlanders. As a result, Laurence Bruce was removed from office. But by June of the following year, he had returned to the islands as "sheriff-depute".

Laurence Bruce is best known as the builder of Muness Castle, which was completed around 1598. Muness Castle, now a ruin, is the most northerly castle in Great Britain. It was built at the southeast end of Unst, just east of the town of Uyeasound (which was the harbour for the castle), after Earl Robert was succeeded by his son Patrick Stewart, 2nd Earl of Orkney in 1593. Later events proved that Laurence Bruce had good reason to fear the aggression of Earl Patrick. In 1608 Earl Patrick sent a force to besiege the castle, but the attackers abandoned their assault. In 1610 Laurence Bruce testified against Earl Patrick before the Privy Council in Edinburgh. Following a rebellion in Orkney, in August 1614 the Privy Council appointed Laurence Bruce a Commissioner and charged him with apprehending any rebels who might seek shelter in Shetland.

Laurence Bruce died at Muness castle in August 1617 and was buried inside the old church at nearby Sandwick. Ownership of the castle passed to his second eldest son Andrew Bruce of Muness, a quieter and more popular man than his father. Laurence Bruce's eldest son, Alexander Bruce of Cultmalindie, returned to the mainland of Scotland to run the family's property in Perthshire.

Illegitimate sons include Scipio Bruce of Meikleure. William Bruce of Symbister, his nephew or son, married Marjorie Stewart, a daughter of John Stewart (an illegitimate son of James V) and Jean Hepburn.

| Preceded by John Bruce | Laird of Cultmalindie; 1547–1617 | Succeeded by Alexander Bruce |
| Unknown | Sheriff of Shetland c. 1571–1617 | Unknown |
