= Duntarvie Castle =

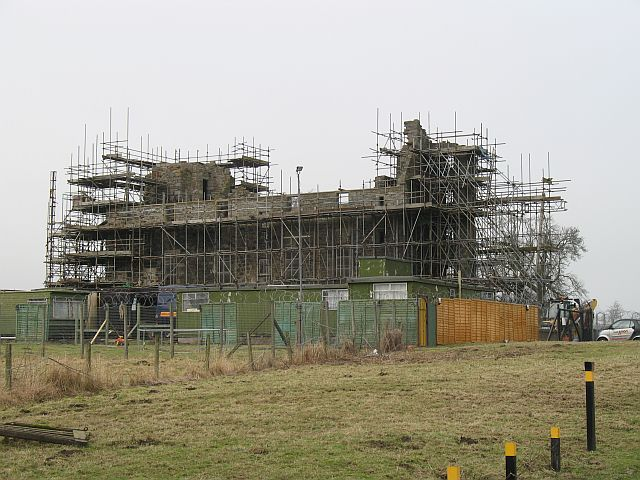
- Duntarvie Castle

- Duntarvie Castle shown within West Lothian
- 55.9726°N 3.4588°W
- Location: Near Winchburgh

Listed Building – Category A
- Designated: 22 February 1972
- Reference no.: LB6422

Scheduled monument
- Designated: 21 August 1953
- Reference no.: SM1905

Duntarvie Castle is a ruined Scots Renaissance house in West Lothian, Scotland. It is located 1.5 kilometres (0.93 mi) north of Winchburgh and 9 kilometres (5.6 mi) east of Linlithgow, close to the M9 motorway. Constructed in the late 16th century, the building has been undergoing restoration since the 1990s. The house is protected as a category A listed building, and a scheduled monument.

== History ==
The lands of Duntarvie were in possession of the Lindsays from 1527. A charter of 1605 transferred the property from the Lindsays to the Hamiltons of Abercorn, and this 1605 charter infers the existence of the castle as early as 1212. The Durham family held Duntarvie as tenants of the Hamiltons, although according to Historic Environment Scotland, Duntarvie was granted to James Durham in 1588, who had the building constructed shortly afterward.

Alexander Durham (died 1584) held royal appointments including as a clerk in the Exchequer, the administrator of John Stewart of Coldingham, and Master of the Prince's Wardrobe to King James VI. Alexander's son James took over his father's offices in 1580, and served as Chamberlain for Linlithgowshire between 1595 and 1600. James Durham and his wife Marion Hepburn were guests at the coronation of Anne of Denmark, and James VI bought clothes for James Durham to wear at the events. James Durham witnessed several royal charters made by King James at Holyroodhouse. The Durham family left Duntarvie in the 1770s.

By 1826 the house was in the ownership of the Earl of Hopetoun, and in need of urgent repair. It was uninhabited from the 1840s, and by the 20th century it was ruinous and roofless.

In the late 20th century the shell was purchased by kiltmaker Geoffrey Nicholsby, with the intention of restoring it as a headquarters of his business Highland Crafts Ltd. Preparatory work began in 1994, but part of the east tower collapsed in January 1995. In 2008 it was reported that Nicholsby had obtained scheduled monument consent for the restoration, but was placing the property on the market. However, no sale took place, and in 2013 Nicholsby sought planning permission for a "tank play park" in the grounds, that would fund the restoration. Though initially positive, West Lothian Council refused permission when no legal agreement could be reached on the restoration funding. In 2015, roof trusses were installed on the building.

In 2018 the land was granted planning permission to build a permanent marquee structure on the property to host weddings and events. This allowed the site to begin to host weddings with temporary Marquees and in May 2019 the building of the new 'Summerhouse' style marquee began on the land to the rear of the property.

Work continued in the Great hall of the castle with the aim to opening this part of the building up to couples who wish to get married within the castle building.

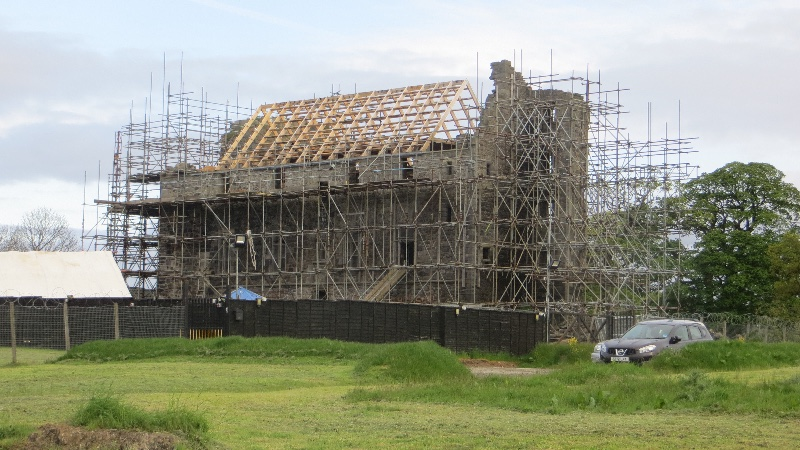
Duntarvie in 2015 with new roof trusses

== Description ==
The house comprises a long, rectangular three-storey main block, with square four-storey towers projecting northwards at the ends. Each of these towers had a flat roof with a stone balustrade, and is flanked by a turnpike stair housed in a turret in the internal angle. The ground floor and first floor are linked by a straight stair, unusual for its date.
