= William Mudie of Breckness =

William Mudie of Breckness was a Scottish administrator, Chamberlain of Orkney for Mary of Guise and Mary, Queen of Scots, and involved in an inquiry about oppressions in Orkney and Shetland.

== Career ==
William Mudie was a son of Gilbert Mudie (or Mudy or Moodie) and Elizabeth Halcro. His properties included Breckness on mainland Orkney, and Snelsetter and Melsetter in South Walls, held by the family for many years under udal law. He used the title "Master" which was often adopted by university graduates. He was involved in legal business and held clergy offices.

Mudie's official duties meant that he often resided in Kirkwall. He was involved in settling disputes about inheritance and produce by gathering evidence and arbitration. In 1551 with John Bruce, he held a commission in the name of Mary, Queen of Scots to hear complaints made against Thomas Tulloch of Fluris, the constable of the Bishop of Orkney, Robert Reid. In later years, Tulloch was suspected of tampering with weights. Feudal rents and the equivalents of teinds in Orkney involved a complex system of traditional duties and measures of produce which led to disputes.

Mudie and Adam Bothwell received payments in 1555 from Mary of Guise, who was Regent of Scotland, for travelling to Orkney and Shetland. Mudie corresponded with Mary of Guise about the marketing of salt and fish and about her French baillie in Orkney, Monsieur Bonot or Bonnauld, who resided at Kirkwall Castle and had a personal dispute with the comptroller Bartholomew de Villemore. The fish from Orkney was sold to an English merchant. As Chamberlain for the Bishop of Orkney, Mudie collected and sold produce due to the crown as teinds. After the Scottish Reformation, the income contributed to the stipends of kirk ministers and to the daily expenses of the royal household.

In August 1559, Mudie was in Edinburgh. He witnessed a transaction made by Elizabeth Stevenson, wife of prominent Edinburgh merchant Alexander Park, who was settling a debt to John Cant of Leith. The notary at the meeting on the High Street was Gilbert Grote.

In 1561, Mudie and Henry Sinclair of Strome were chased by a dozen men from Kirkwall Castle. Details of the incident are unclear, though it seems the men were somehow futhering the interest of the Bishop of Orkney, who had gone to France to visit Queen Mary. Henry and his brother Robert Sinclair had recently taken and occupied the Bishop's "place of Birsay". Mudie was appointed Queen Mary's chamberlain of Orkney on 10 December 1561, and was involved in the sales of Orkney produce which contributed to crown income.

Mudie had married Catherine Sinclair. In 1563, Mudie granted some of his lands to his eldest son Adam. William Mudie's brother Thomas was found to have acted as a pirate in 1564 and William undertook to make reparations.

=== Complaints against Lord Robert Stewart ===
In April 1577, following complaints about Robert Stewart, 1st Earl of Orkney, Mudie came to the Palace of Holyrood to give evidence from Orkney to Regent Morton and the Privy Council and William Henderson, the Dingwall Pursuivant and treasurer of Orkney, gave evidence for Shetland. Mudie and Henderson had heard evidence against William Sinclair of Underhoul or Uyea, a son of Olave Sinclair. Many island farmers complained that Lord Robert Stewart had appointed Laurence Bruce "foud" or deputy sheriff of Shetland, who used fraudulent measures for the duties of cloth (wadmell, traditionally measured by the cuttell) and butter (weighed by bismeir) and oil (reckoned in cans).

Mudie himself was a victim of the Earl, said to have been robbed, evicted, and imprisoned with others in the "castle of Kirkwall and Yairdis". The yards was a site beside the Bishop's Palace, Kirkwall and the name House of the Yards was later applied to the Earl's Palace. Kirkwall Castle was located at a different site. In June 1568, William Henderson wrote that Mudie and other Orkney men intended to rise against Lord Robert and seize Kirkwall and the "steeple".

=== Later life ===
In 1593, Mudie sold Dounreay to the Earl of Caithness. Mudie died between November 1595 and June 1597
