= Dishington =

Scottish surname

Dishington is a surname of Scottish origin. The name first arises in Northumberland where they were seated as lords of the manor in the shire of Dissington, Northumberland.

Spelling variations of this family name include: Dishington, Dischingtoun, Dissington, Dissyngton, Dyshington, Diston and many more.

== History ==
Much of what is known of the early history of the Dishington family comes from a monograph by local historian Walter Wood entitled The East Neuk of Fife: its history and antiquities.

The family history begins with Sir William Dishington who is listed among the compatriots of Alexander Ramsay of Dalhousie. Sir William married Elizabeth Bruce, daughter of Robert de Brus, 6th Lord of Annandale and sister of Robert the Bruce (a.k.a. King Robert I). He held charters from King Robert and his son David II to the lands of Balglassie in Aberlemno and Tollyquhond in Forfarshire. He died around 1360.

Upon his death, Sir William's two sons split his estate: his son William (also styled Sir William Dishington) inherited the lands of Ardross, while John received lands in Longhermiston.

William the younger was held in high honor at the court of Edinburgh, holding positions of honor including bachillanus seneschal, Master of the Fabric of St. Mohan's Church, and in 1370, Sheriff of Fife. It is believed that William the younger was responsible for the construction of Ardross Castle. William had two children: son Thomas and daughter Elspath.

The generations of Dishingtons continue as:

- Thomas Dishington of Ardross: Received a charter in 1402 from Robert III in which he is still acknowledged as nepoti nostro (our family), indicating that the family ties to the royal family were still recognized two generations after William the Elder's marriage.
- John Dishington, son of Thomas
- Thomas Dishington, son of John: a captain at the Palace of St. Andrews
- George Dishington, son of John and brother of Thomas
- William Dishington, son of George: fiar of Ardross, slain at the Battle of Pinkie Cleugh in 1547
- Paul Dishington of Ardross, son of William: had two daughters who, upon his death became wards of the second Earl of Arran, who married them to two members of his family
- John Dishington also a son of William and brother of Paul, moved the family to the Orkney Islands, where the family history is taken up by Buckham Hugh Hossack in his A Kirkwall in the Orkneys.

== In Orkney ==
John Dishington (son of William Dishington 6th of Ardross) was one of the Gentleman Adventurers of Fife who, in 1597, attempted to seize the Isle of Lewis from Clan MacLeod after the latter's claim to the land was set aside owing to constant feuding of the clan with neighbors and amongst themselves. When the attempt failed, many of the Adventurers (Dishington included) retreated to Orkney.

In Orkney, John found employment in the household of Robert Stewart, 1st Earl of Orkney, where he served as commissary and Sheriff of Orkney and Shetland, as well as attorney to Lord Robert.

John's son Andrew served as master of the grammar school in Orkney, and Andrew's son James served the Stewart family as an agent in Bergen, Norway. James married and remained in Norway, beginning the Scandinavian branch of the Dishington name.
