= Olave Sinclair =

Olave Sinclair (died 1573) of Havera (South Havra) and Brow (near Dunrossness) was an official on Shetland, known as the "foud". He collected taxes due to the Scottish crown. His first name is sometimes written as Oliver, Ola, or Olaf.

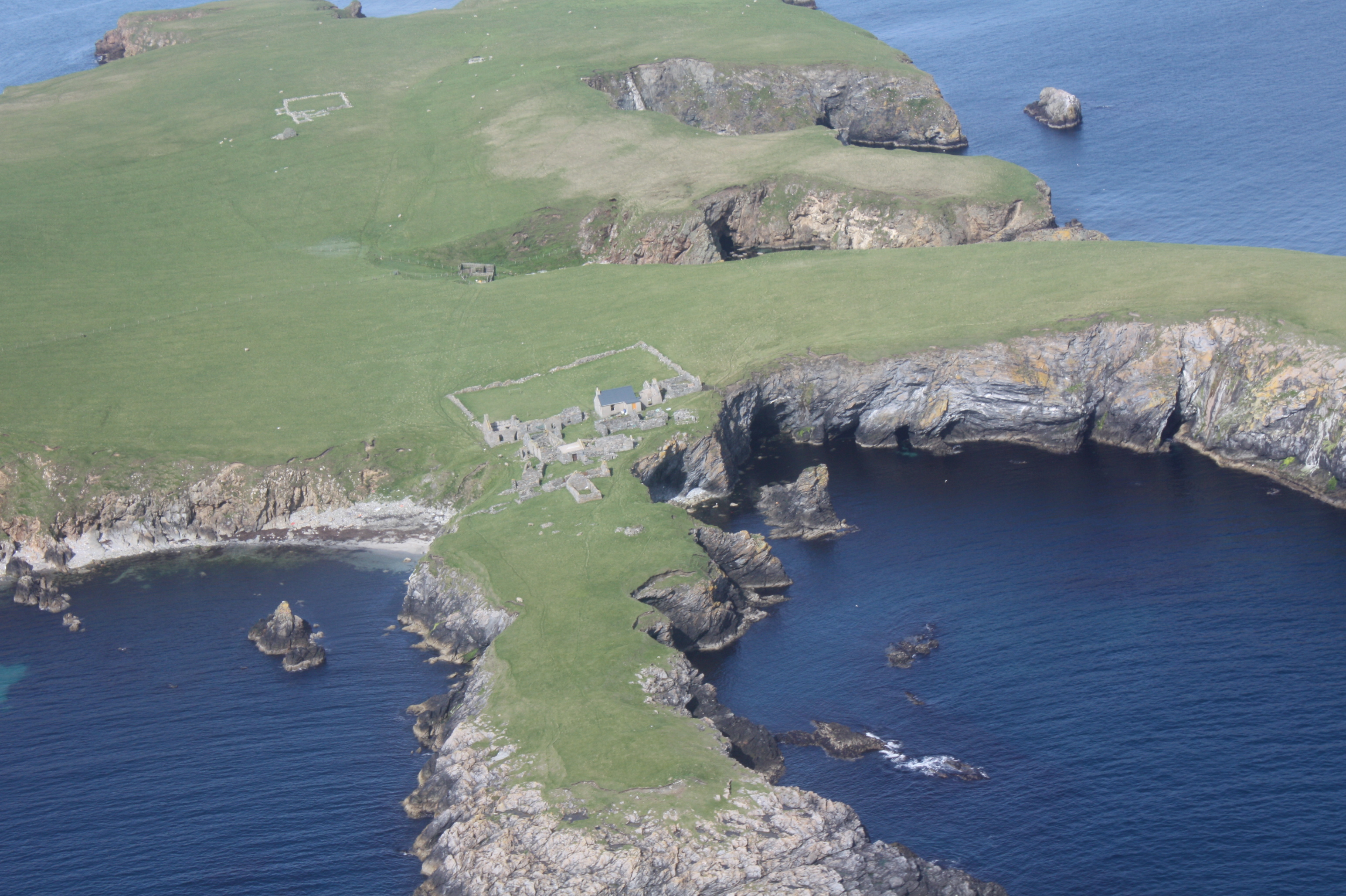
Sinclair was known by the territorial designation of "Havera", South Havra.

== Battle of Summerdale ==
Olave Sinclair was present at the battle of Summerdale in 1529 and in 1539 was given a respite (exemption from prosecution) for the death of John Sinclair, 3rd Earl of Caithness.

Olave Sinclair was probably a close relative of Edward Sinclair of Strome, who was foud of Shetland in the 1530s.

== Feud with the MacLeod of Lewis ==
Olave Sinclair is said to have been blind in one eye, the result of leaping from Sumburgh Head to escape a band of marauders from the Isle of Lewis. A version of the story explains that Sinclair had a quarrel with William MacLeod of Lewis, whose wife had brought him lands in Shetland. Two previous attempts by the MacLeods to seize Sinclair in revenge for William MacLeod's death were foiled by his Fair Isle allies.

Sinclair was involved in the murder of a William Lewis or Lowis and his three servants on Shetland in the silence of night in June 1543. The assailant from Lewis, traditionally described as Hucheon MacLeod, seems to have been Hugh Morrison, brieve of Lewis, of Trotterness, who killed Olave's son, Henry Sinclair, around the year 1551. In October 1564, Mary, Queen of Scots granted Sinclair a remission from prosecution for this crime.

== Foud of Shetland ==
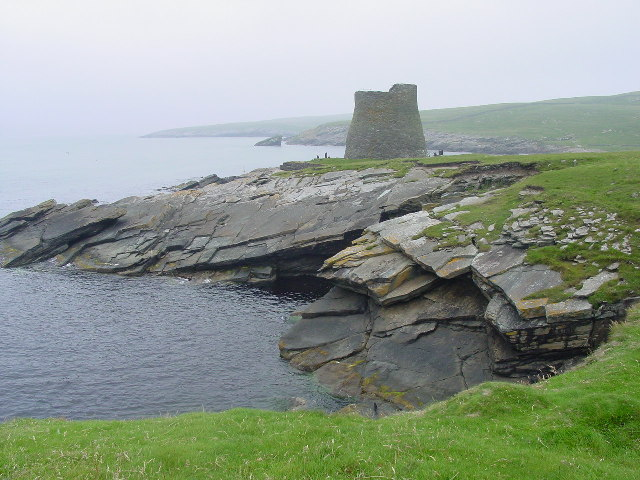
Sinclair had a farm on Mousa

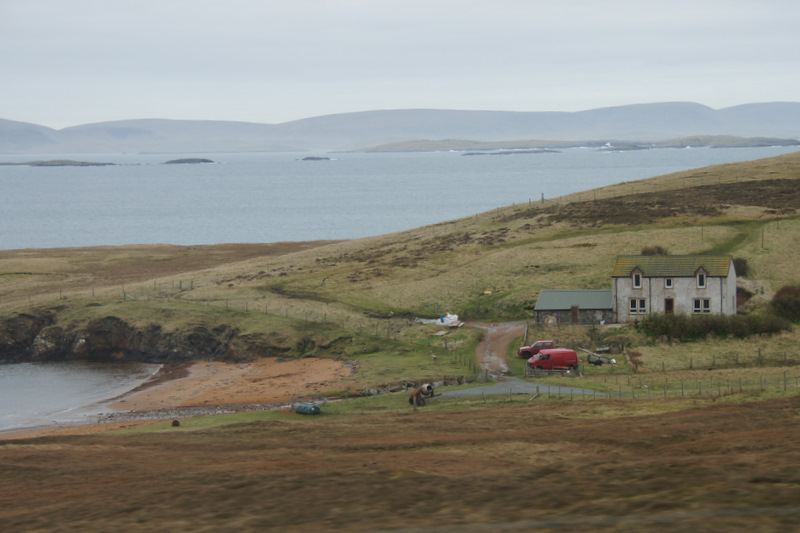
Sinclair obtained the "South House" at Reawick

Sinclair was foud or foud depute, the office of foudry was a kind of bailiff or chamberlain of the Lordship of Shetland. He was sometimes called the "foud and chamberlain" or "Sheriff of Shetland". He presided over the Sheriff Court of Shetland held at Laxfirth (near Tingwall Airport) in March 1561. A letter in the Scots language confirming his appointment on 12 December 1561, calls him the "chamberlane and bailye of oure lordschip and landis of Yeitland, baith maineland and ilis". The word "foud" has a Danish or Norn origin, reflecting the history of the islands.

As foud, Sinclair collected feudal rents in money and farm produce due to the Scottish crown and sent them to Edinburgh. Rents typically included dairy produce, and the butter, known as the "fat goods" was barrelled in Kirkwall on Orkney and shipped to Leith. The skipper Robert Boswell took empty barrels and salt to Kirkwall. The produce was sold by the queen's argentar Alexander Durham to contribute to the household expenses of Mary, Queen of Scots. The fat goods were accounted in a local measure called a lipsund. Sinclair's merchant network included William Mudie of Breckness, Chamberlain of Orkney, John Hart of the Canongate, and Andrew Lamb of Leith and Southtyre.

Olave Sinclair and David Scollay, a burgess of Kirkwall bought a proportion of the Orkney produce or "victual" of 1562 for £295 Scots. Orkney produce was recognised in Scottish court culture. In December 1566, during an entertainment written by George Buchanan for the baptism of James VI at Stirling Castle, Latin verses were sung by nymphs and satyrs in honour of the food and hosts, and characters represented the Orkney Islands.

Sinclair was the proprietor of several farms. He obtained the south house of Reawick in Sandsting by exchange in 1544. In July 1558, Scottish ships from Aberdeen, the Meikle Swallow and Little Swallow, attacked an English fleet. The Scottish sailors took cattle and other goods belonging to Sinclair on Mousa. Sinclair claimed compensation from the owner Thomas Nicholson in the Edinburgh courts.

== Making accounts and issuing permits ==
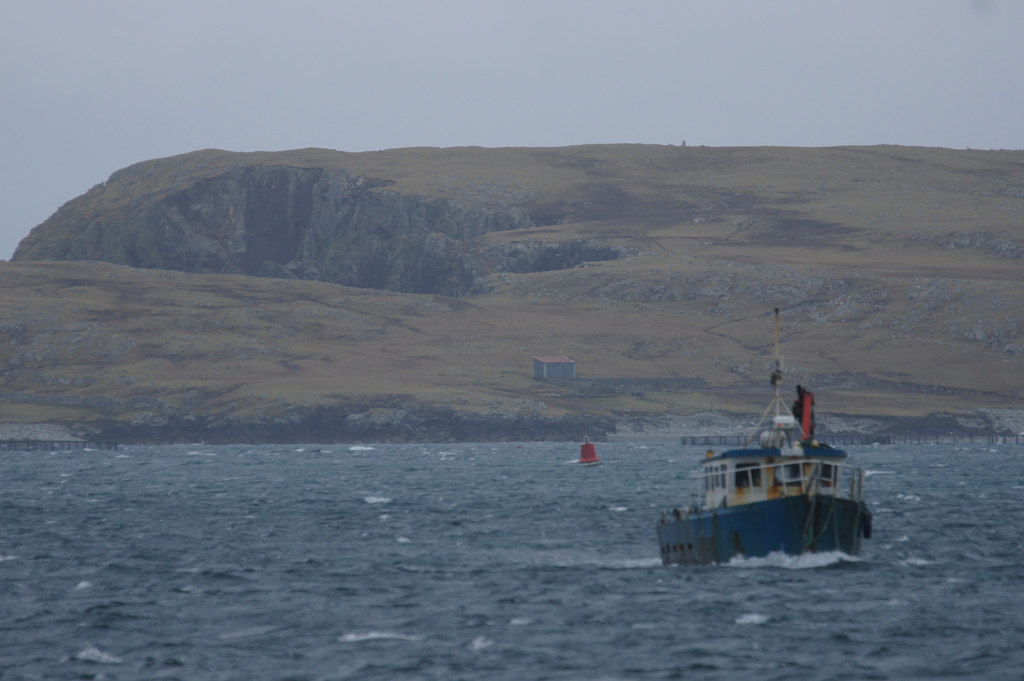
Sinclair issued permits for exporters to work from Shetland harbours including Baltasound

Robert Stewart of Strathdon, a half-brother of Mary, Queen of Scots, who later became the Earl of Orkney was given the lands of Orkney and Shetland in 1565. William Murray of Tullibardine, the Comptroller, was appointed as foud. Sinclair continued in his role and was called the "foud depute". In July 1567, the Privy Council of Scotland asked Sinclair, as a "receiver" of rents, to submit an account for the queen's income in previous years and come to Edinburgh to show it to the lords and auditors of the Scottish exchequer.

Sinclair's receipts were recorded in the Exchequer Rolls prepared for Murray of Tullibardine as Comptroller. In 1566 he returned £1126 Scots and £330 worth of cereal. The fat goods and wadmell of 1566 were sold to an Edinburgh merchant Robert Watson. Sinclair was censured for not seding his accounts in time to the Privy Council in Edinburgh.

In 1567, Sinclair collected £1159. In subsequent years the Shetland rents were recorded as receipts from Robert Stewart, 1st Earl of Orkney. The Foud owned or maintained a ship, in 1568 the skipper was Robert Boswall.

Sinclair's official work included writing licences and testimonials in favour of Hanse merchant skippers like Johan Kordes of Bremen who was given a permit to use the haven of Baltasound in 1560. In August 1563, Sinclair wrote to the burgomaster and town council of Bremen about Kordes and his unlicensed competitors, who were exhausting the island resources. In September 1567, Sinclair prepared a testimonial for Gerdt Hemeling of Bremen whose ship and cargo of salted fish had been taken from his trading base at "Drosteness" (Dunrossness) by the Earl of Bothwell, who was briefly Duke of Orkney. Sinclair employed a legal clerk or writer called Peter Hog who was the scribe of his official documents and helped Sinclair add his signature with his "hand led on the quill". Hog was called the "Sheriff Clerk of Shetland". Sinclair's servant Henry Nauchty also wrote documents.

== Bothwell and Sinclair ==
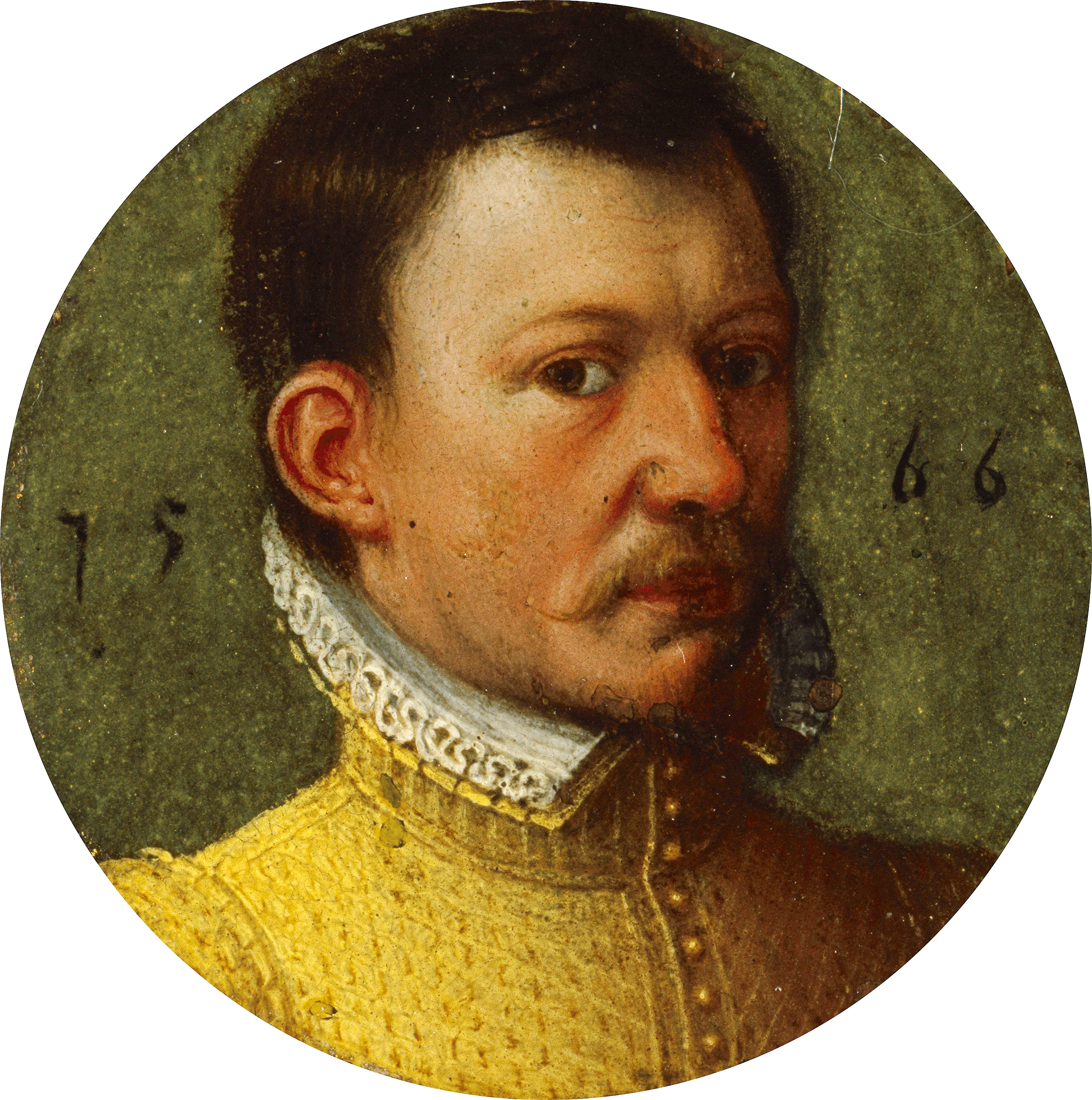
The Earl of Bothwell negotiated with Hanse skippers over dinner at Olave Sinclair's house on Unst

The Privy Council noted on 17 July 1567 that Olave Sinclair had received the rents and dues for 1566 but had not submitted an account or made a payment to the Queen's comptroller. He was ordered to come to Edinburgh.

A Scottish chronicle, the Diurnal of Occurrents mentions that Bothwell had dinner with Sinclair in Shetland in August 1567 after his flight from the battle of Carberry Hill. The English ambassador in Edinburgh, Nicholas Throckmorton, wrote that Sinclair, the "principal man of the Isle named Fogge", was a supporter of Bothwell, and would help Bothwell escape the pursuing force led by William Kirkcaldy of Grange and William Murray of Tullibardine.

In January 1568, Bothwell wrote of his meeting with the Bremen merchant and skipper Gerdt Hemeling at Sinclair the receiver's house, probably meaning the house at Brow near Dunrossness. He had hoped that Hemeling's ships and those of a Hamburg trader would join his fleet. Grange and Murray arrived at Unst and disturbed Bothwell's plans. He joined with the Hamburgh merchant at Scalloway and sailed to Norway. Bothwell took the Pelican, one of Hemeling's ships, with him.

Olave Sinclair wrote a testimonial for Gerd Hemeling on 15 September 1567 at Laxfirth. It stated that the Bremen merchant traded at the harbour of Drosteness (Dunrossness) and paid his customs. Bothwell had taken a ship from Dunrossness and spoiled its cargo of salt fish.

== Death ==
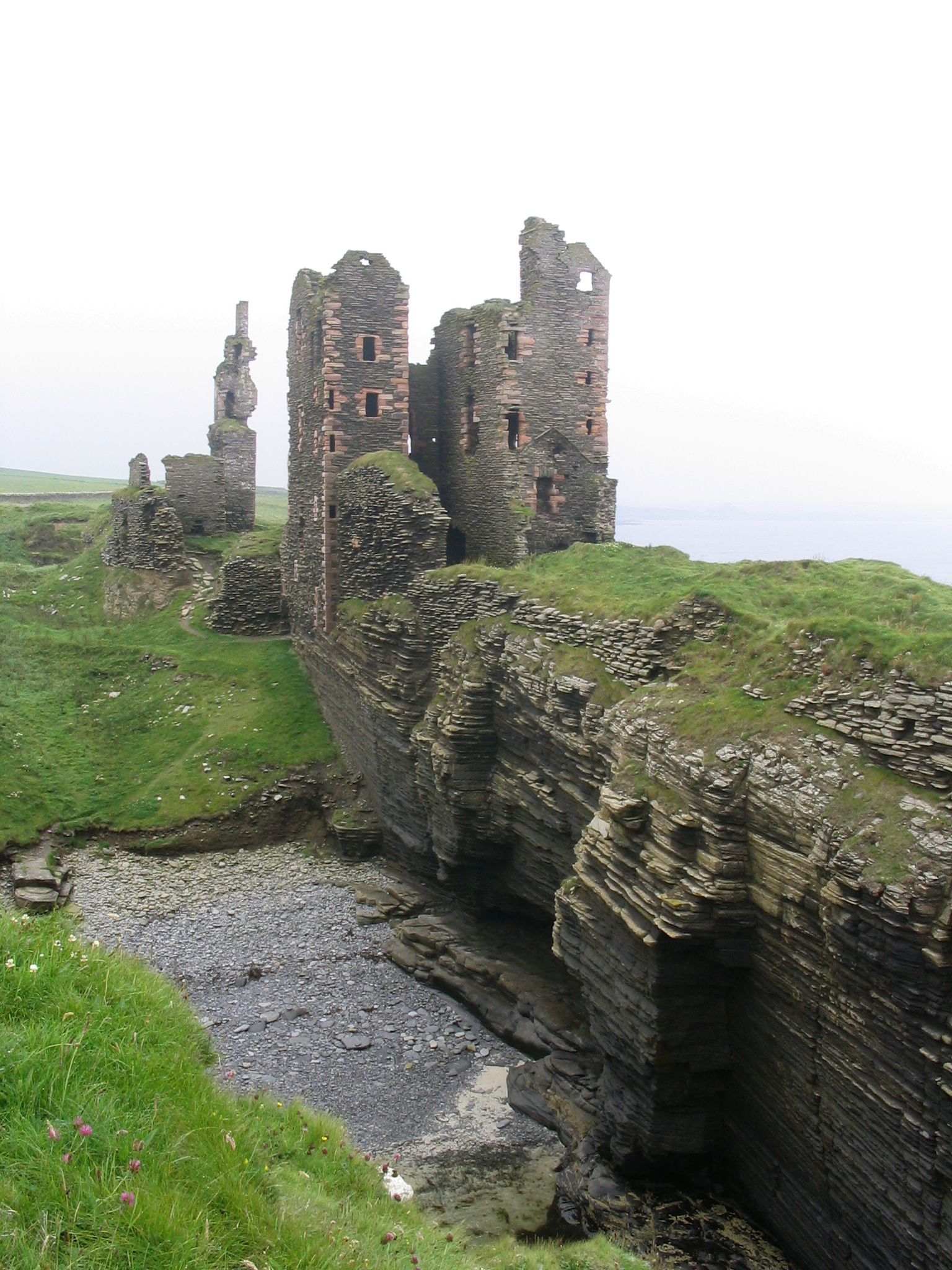
Olave Sinclair had a stroke and was carried by sea to Girnigoe Castle

Sinclair was discredited by Lord Robert Stewart and his wife Jean Kennedy. He lost his office of foud and was "put to the horn", denounced as bankrupt. At this time he was ill in Kirkcaldy. Sinclair was taken north to Girnigoe Castle in May 1573 where he was unable to speak or move.

Olave Sinclair made his will in 1571 and divided his estates between his three sons according to traditional udal law. James VI confirmed the ownership of lands by his son William Sinclair in March 1579.

Arthur Sinclair of Eisweck (Eswick) was Sheriff Depute of Shetland in March 1572. Laurence Bruce was appointed tacksman of the foudry in 1571, and was known as the foud. By April 1573, Bruce was "undoubted foud, sheriff depute and chamberlain of Shetland".

Complaints against Laurence Bruce in 1576 included the use of false measures to increase the profit of customs and duties. For almost 30 years, farmers on Bressay had used a weight for butter called a "bismeyr" made with Olave Sinclair's consent by William Urving of Trondra. Bruce introduced a new larger "bismeyr".

== Family ==
Sinclair's children included:

- William Sinclair of Underhoull or Uyea, who married Marjorie or Margaret Stewart (died 1607), a daughter of John Stewart, Commendator of Coldingham and Jean Hepburn. Her second husband was William Bruce of Symbister
- Henry Sinclair, who was killed in a feud by Hugh Brief alias Hugh Morrison, brieve of Lewis, of Trotterness.
- Matthew Sinclair of Ness, who was murdered in 1602.

One of his sons was contracted to marry Katrine Halkat in 1547. She was a daughter of Robert Halkat, kirk minister of North Maving or Northmavine. A daughter married Richard Leask, who was murdered in a feud by a servant of Henry Sinclair of Sandwick.
