= Mousa, Shetland =

Small island in Shetland, Scotland

Mousa
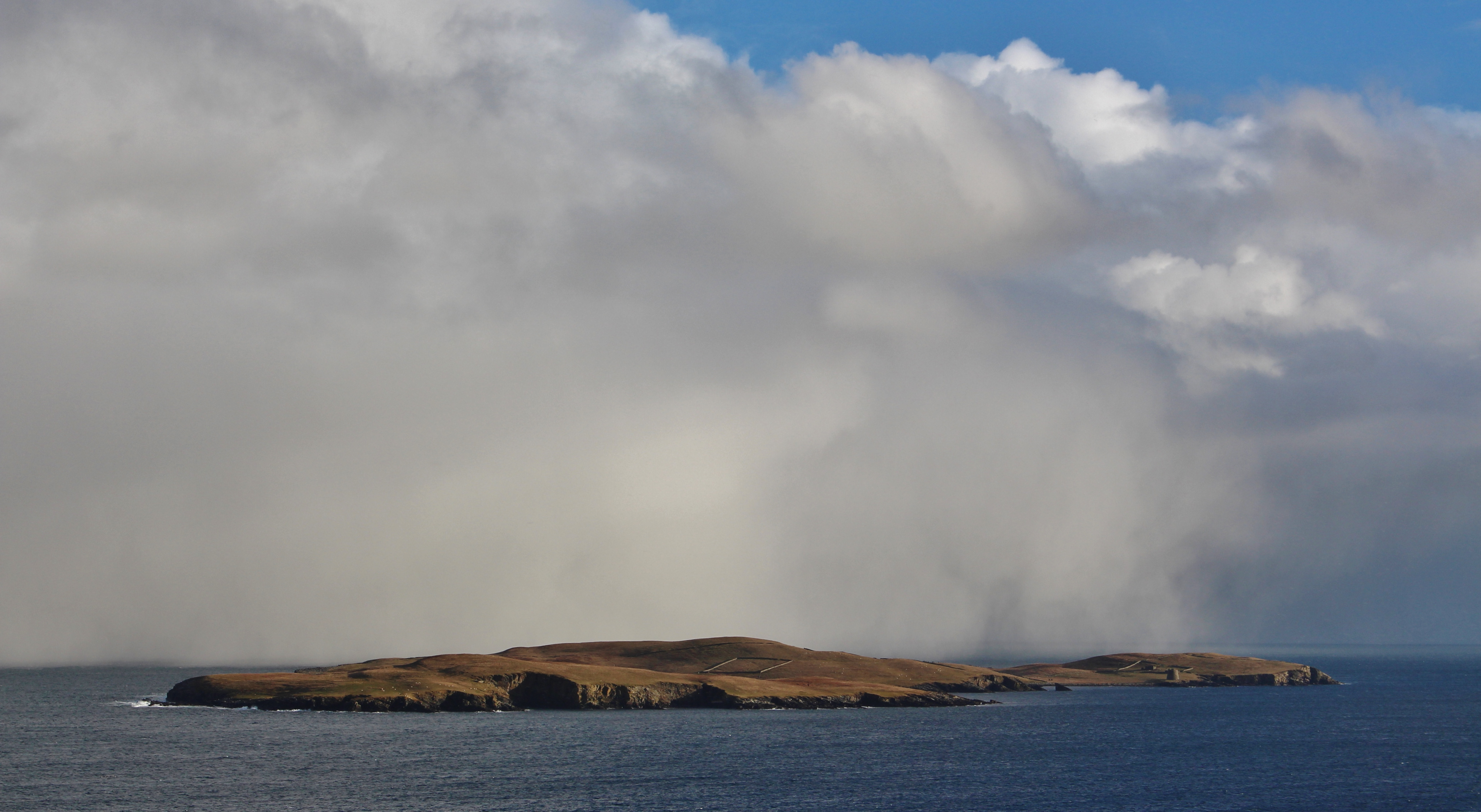
- A snow shower over Mousa

Location
- Mousa shown within the Shetland Islands
- OS grid reference: HU460240
- Coordinates: 60.00°N 1.17°W

Name
- Name meaning: Old Norse: moor or mossy island
- Old Norse name: Mósey (Norwegian: Mosøy)

Physical geography
- Island group: Shetland
- Area: 180 hectares (0.69 sq mi)
- Area rank: 115=
- Highest elevation: 55 metres (180 ft)

Administration
- Council area: Shetland Islands
- Country: Scotland
- Sovereign state: United Kingdom

Demographics
- Population: 0

Mousa (Shaetlan pronunciation: [ˈmusə] MOOSE-ə; Old Norse: Mosey "moss island") is a small island in Shetland, Scotland, uninhabited since the nineteenth century. The island is known for the Broch of Mousa, an Iron Age round tower, and is designated as a Special Protection Area for storm-petrel breeding colonies.

== Geography ==
Mousa lies directly on the 60th parallel, 60 degrees north of the equator and 30 degrees south of the North Pole. It lies one nautical mile (2 kilometres) off the east coast of Mainland Shetland in the parish of Dunrossness about 15 nautical miles (28 kilometres) south of Lerwick. Almost divided in two by inlets, East and West Hams, the island is 1 1/2 miles (2.5 kilometres) long and almost one mile (1.5 kilometres) in maximum width. Geologically beds of hard sandstone alternate with muddy limestones that weather to produce fertile soil. A quarry provided flagstones for Lerwick.

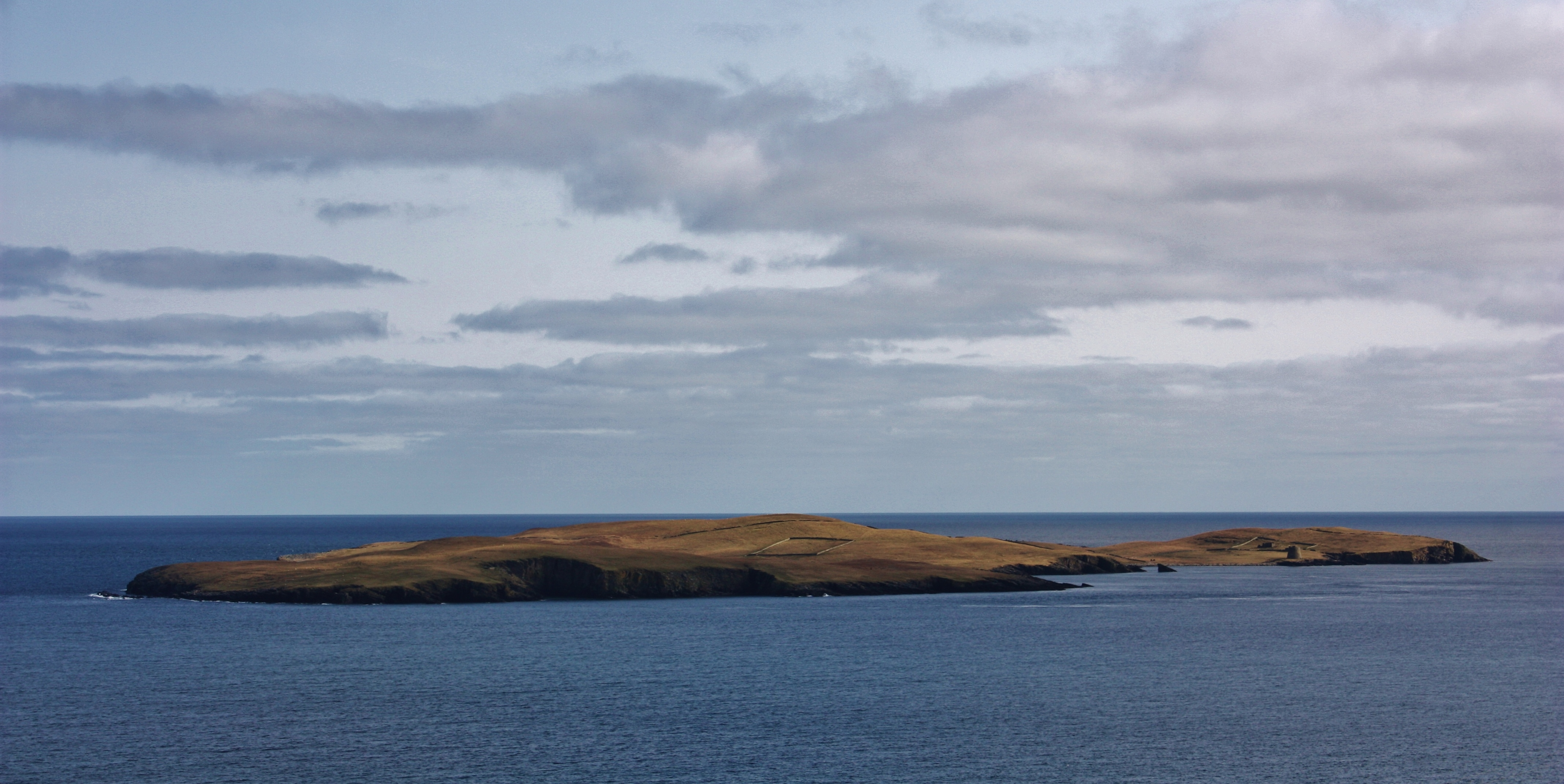
Mousa as seen from the mainland; the broch is visible on the right.

The Norse tended to consider an island to be something that they could circumnavigate, and this included being able to drag a boat over land. Thus Mousa was considered two islands, namely North Isle and South Isle.

== Flora and fauna ==
Mousa's fertile soil supports a rich diversity of plants, including sheep's-bit and creeping willow in the herb-rich grassland, despite the wind, salt spray and grazing by sheep.

Mousa is known for grey and common seals, black guillemots, Arctic terns and storm-petrels. It holds c. 6,800 breeding pairs of European storm-petrels in total. This represents about 8% of the British population and 2.6% of the world population. The island is designated as both a Special Protection Area (SAC) and a Site of Special Scientific Interest (SSSI) by NatureScot, and is run as a reserve by the RSPB. The island has also been identified as an Important Bird Area (IBA) by BirdLife International.

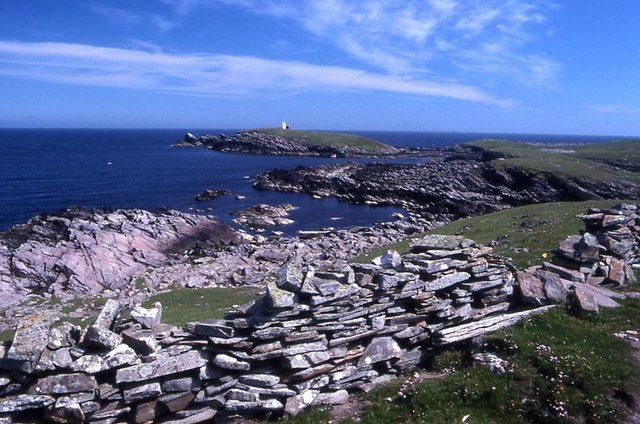
The east coast of Mousa towards the Peerie Bard

The seas surrounding the island host a population of sandeel that provides a food source for many species of fish, seabirds, seals, whales and dolphins: the area is considered to have the most reliable population of sandeels of all the seas surrounding Shetland. These seas are therefore also protected, forming both a Special Area of Conservation (SAC) and a Nature Conservation Marine Protected Area (NCMPA).

== History ==
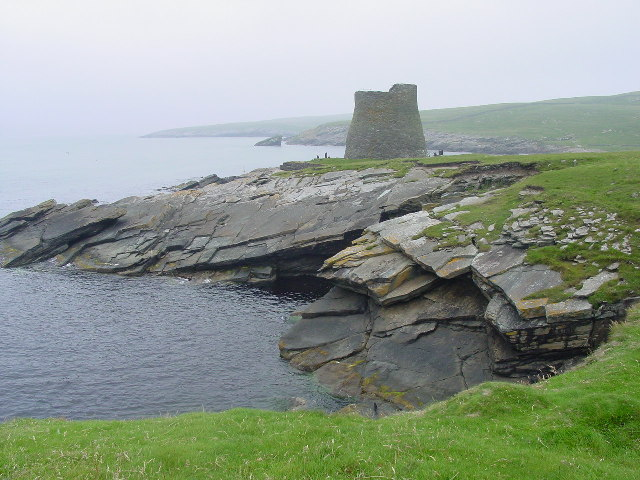
A misty day at Mousa Broch

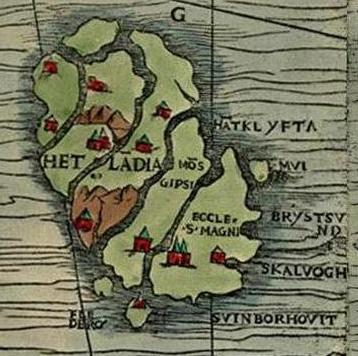
Shetland and Mousa on the Carta Marina in 1539

Mousa Broch is the best preserved Iron Age fortification in the British Isles. The 2000-year-old round tower stands above a rocky shoreline, one of a pair of brochs guarding Mousa Sound. They may be part of a chain of brochs in this part of Shetland, visible from each other as beacons. The other of the "pair", at Burland on the Mainland is far less well preserved. Many brochs were the focus of a settlement, but there has never been a full archaeological investigation to confirm this at Mousa. It was cleared out in 1860 and 1919. Mousa has survived intact to such a height and is thought to never have been much higher than it is today. It escaped stone gathering for nearby stone walls and croft houses (now ruined).

Mousa is mentioned in the Orkneyinga Saga as being used as a place of defence during invasions, as well as a lovers' hideout.

The entrance passage into Mousa Broch is long, reflecting the enormous thickness of its walls. At its base the broch is 15m in diameter, but the interior is only 6m in diameter. Within the huge thickness of the base of the walls are a range of chambers probably used for storage, while at higher levels passages run between the inner and outer skins of the wall. On the inside a steep flight of steps leads to the top of the wall. Halfway up is a landing which probably gave access to an upper level of the interior of the broch, built on a ledge running around the circumference of the interior.

In July 1558, two Scottish ships from Aberdeen, the Meikle Swallow and Little Swallow, attacked an English fleet off Shetland. The Scottish sailors took cattle and other goods belonging to Olave Sinclair on Mousa. Sinclair claimed compensation in the Edinburgh courts.

== Transport ==
The island is readily accessed using the passenger-only ferry which operates from the Shetland Mainland at Leebitton, Sandwick in summer time.

== See also ==
- List of islands of Scotland
