= Gilbert Balfour =

Scottish courtier and mercenary captain

Gilbert Balfour of Westray (died 1576) was a 16th-century Scottish courtier and mercenary captain.

== Family background, marriage, and Orkney lands ==
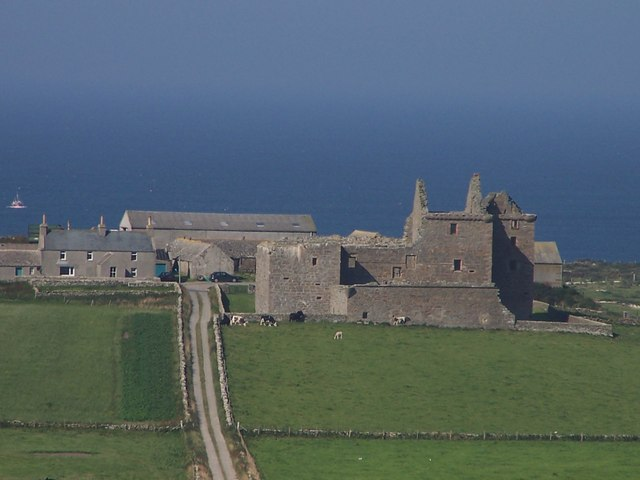
Noltland Castle

He was the second son of Andrew Balfour of Mountquhanie in Kilmany, Fife, and Janet Bruce. Balfour married Margaret Bothwell, the half-sister of Adam Bothwell, Bishop of Orkney, who endowed him with the isle of Westray and lands at Birsay including Marwick, Birsay Besouth, and Skalden Fea, from episcopal property. Balfour and Bothwell quarrelled over the lands at Birsay.

Gilbert Balfour was also appointed Constable by his brother-in-law. His duties included administrating the collection of rents in the bishopric, which included "fat goods" of butter and oil from Shetland. The produce was shipped to Leith and sold to merchants. He was made sheriff of Orkney in 1566.

At Noltland above the Bay of Pierowall on Westray, Balfour built one of the most impressive castles in the Orkney Islands, and indeed the Northern Isles. Construction took place in the 1560s. It is notable for an unusually large spiral staircase, "second only to Fyvie Castle, while its triple tiers of gunloops are without parallel in Scotland, if not Europe".

== Master of Household ==
On 1 October 1565 Mary, Queen of Scots, appointed him her Master of Household, a leading servant responsible for wages and the provision of food. Balfour was appointed in the place of James Ogilvie of Findlater who was said to have neglected his duties.

Mary ordered Balfour to pursue Patrick Bellenden of Stenhouse, who had threatened her with a dagger or pistol during the murder of David Rizzio. Bellenden was driven from Scotland and Orkney by Balfour's "extreme pursuit".

Balfour had a prominent role at the baptism of Prince James at Stirling Castle in December 1566. There was a procession bringing the food into the Great Hall, which he joined as a Master of Household walking with the Laird of Findlater and Francisco de Busso. During the entertainment, written by George Buchanan, Latin verses were sung by nymphs and satyrs in honour of the food and hosts, and characters represented the Orkney Islands.

The accusations against Queen Mary known as the "Book of Articles" mention Balfour at the baptism, alleging that Mary asked him to employ fifty soldiers armed with guns for the safety of the Earl of Bothwell.

In 1569 Balfour was mentioned in the trial of William Stewart of Luthrie, a herald accused of witchcraft and conspiracy against Regent Moray. William Stewart was said to have made predictions about the death of Lord Darnley and Queen Mary's remarriage in Balfour's presence in Balfour's Edinburgh lodging.

In January 1573, Gilbert Balfour and his brothers, James Balfour of Pittendreich and Robert Balfour, were pardoned for treason and other crimes by Regent Morton and given a caution or bail of 10,000 merks to continue in good behaviour. Morton required Balfour and his wife to surrender Westray Castle and his lands at Noltland to Robert Stewart, 1st Earl of Orkney, who was feuar of Orkney and Zetland, and his wife Jean Kennedy.

Before he could ever use the castle, Balfour was executed in Stockholm for participating in the Mornay Plot against King John III of Sweden. Ownership of Noltland passed to Archibald Balfour of Westray and on to Andrew Balfour of Montquhanie.
