= Pittarthie Castle =

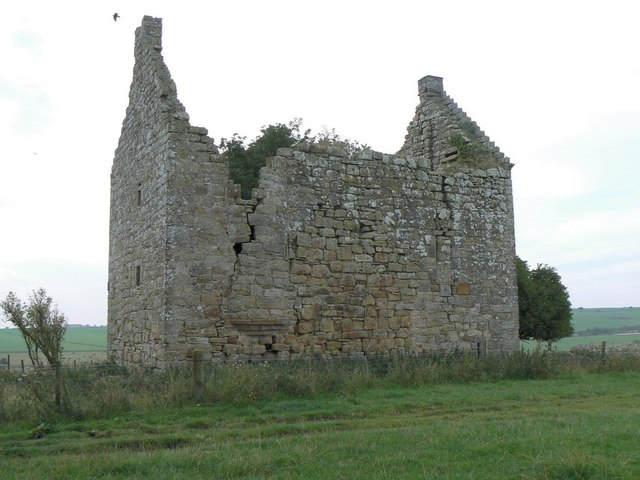
- Pittarthie Castle

- Location of Pittarthie Castle in Fife
- 56.2719°N 2.7750°W

Scheduled monument
- Designated: 29 October 2003
- Reference no.: SM870

Pittarthie Castle is the remains of what was a laird’s tower house in Fife, Scotland dating to the end of the sixteenth century. The ruins of the structure are located 2.5 kilometres (1.6 mi) southwest of Dunino, and 6.5 kilometres (4.0 mi) northwest of Anstruther. The name is spelled Pittarthie and Pittairthie in extant records. The ruins are protected as a scheduled monument.

== History ==
The present house was built around 1580 for James Monypenny of Pitmilly. Monypenny held the estate from the Patrick Adamson, the Archbishop of Saint Andrews.

In 1598, Pittarthie Castle and the surrounding lands were granted to Andrew Logan of Easter Granton.

The estate was later bought by Andrew Bruce, a son of William Bruce of Symbister, in 1636 or 1644. The house was remodeled by William Bruce of Pittarthie in 1653. In 1654 William Bruce inherited the property from his father, Andrew Bruce. Members of the Bruce family continued living in Pittarthie Castle through into the 18th century.

In 1882, the house, called "Pittairthie Castle", was described as “a roofless ruin in the southwest of the [Dunino] parish, partly very ancient... partly a structure of 1653; and in its oldest portion consists of a large square tower, with vaults beneath”. The description “partly very ancient” may have resulted from observation of the coarser masonry at the bottom of the south wall, mentioned in the later description, which would suggest an even earlier structure had stood on the site. The estate dates from the 14th century according to one report, which also states that the property passed to the Hannays of Kingsmuir sometime after about 1700.

== The ruins ==
There are substantial remains of the hilltop house. The house was three storeys tall and consists of two blocks: a larger main block that lies along the south–west axis, and a second smaller wing is attached to the southwest of the main block. The building is a defensible house that was built in a staggered "L" plan with a stair tower is located in the inner angle. The entrance, which appears to be the original, is located at the base of the stair tower. The northwest corner of the smaller wing is rounded. The stonework is good quality rubble with ashlar dressings, but much coarser masonry appears at the bottom of the south wall and is possibly evidence of an earlier building. The building's defences include a gunloop beside the roll-moulded door and pistol holes below all the window sills.

Tower houses such as Pittarthie were usually associated with additional buildings, courtyards, or gardens, but these rarely survive. Pittarthie is unusual in that these associated buildings have survived alongside the house. About 30 meters north of the house are the remains of a range of buildings, and the remains of a walled garden and a group of garden terraces lie to the south and southwest. The surrounding buildings and walled gardens survive today as the foundations of the stone walls, and terraces appear as earthworks.

The date 1682 is carved, together with William Bruce's arms and initials, on a segmental pediment over the first floor hall's south window. This window, like most of the others, has typically late 17th century rounded arrises. The interior is derelict. In the tunnel-vaulted jamb, there is a kitchen with a huge north fireplace, and a water inlet in the west wall. Perhaps also of late 17th-century origin was the addition of a north stair turret.

A modern Ordnance Survey map shows Pittarthie Castle ruins located in a field southwest of Dunino, not far north of Carnbee, and the castle is also shown on some popular maps of Castles of Scotland.
