= Sheriff of Orkney and Shetland =

The Sheriff of Orkney and Shetland, also known as the Sheriff of Orkney and Zetland, was historically the royal official responsible for enforcing law and order in Orkney and Shetland, Scotland. The office was combined with the role in Shetland of the "foud" and the "foudry". The foud was a bailiff who returned customs and rents due the crown, including butter and oil known as "fat goods".

The sheriffdom of Orkney and Shetland was created in the 16th century upon the ceding of the islands to Scotland for non-payment of the dowry of Margaret's marriage to King James III of Scotland by King Christian I, King of Denmark, Norway and Sweden. Prior to 1748 most sheriffdoms were held on a hereditary basis. From that date, following the Jacobite uprising of 1745, the hereditary sheriffs were replaced by salaried sheriff-deputes, qualified advocates who were members of the Scottish Bar

The position was merged in 1870 with that of the Sheriff of Caithness to create the new position of Sheriff of Caithness, Orkney & Shetland.

== Old feudal duties to the Scottish crown ==
The sheriffs of Orkney and Shetland were involved in collecting rents to the Scottish crown and teinds based on agricultural produce. The rents were known as "land maill" and "wadmell", a measure of cloth. Shetland rents were recorded in a document known as the "Skat of Yetland". "Scat" was the general name for the tax or rent collected from the Shetland crown lands in money or farm produce. Woollen cloth given as rent was called "wadmal" (measured in "cuttells").

Dairy produce, known as "fat goods", was measured in "lipsunds", and oil was measured by the can. The value of the produce was exchanged for Scottish money in coin, called "white silver", first using a traditional reckoning in a local "coinless currency" including the "yopindal". In 1560s, the produce was sold in Kirkwall and in Leith and the proceeds were given to Alexander Durham to meet the expenses of the household of Mary, Queen of Scots. The "fat goods" and "wadmell" of 1566 were sold to Robert Watson, a merchant in Edinburgh. The administrator John Skene recorded figures for rents in Mary's time, and noted that the wadmell cloth was "commounlie sauld to Ducheman".

Prior to their wedding in May 1567, Mary, Queen of Scots, gave James Hepburn, 4th Earl of Bothwell the offices of the "Sheriffshipp of Orkney and fowdry of Shetland, and office of justiciarie within all the boundis als weill of Orknay as Zetland", and made him Duke of Orkney.

During efforts to capture the Earl of Bothwell later in 1567, the yopindal was rated at 22 Scots shillings. The measures and rates of exchange could cause controversy. In 1569, Robert Stewart, 1st Earl of Orkney, wrote about his Shetland rents:

the charter which I have caused make of the lands of Yetland, for the land maillis of Yetland are counted in shillings, pennies, and pounds of butter and wadmell, and a shilling of butter in account of land maillis is 2 lipsund butter in payment, and a shilling of wadmell is 6 cuttall wadmell.

Islanders complained that Laurence Bruce of Cultmalindie had sought the biggest example of a "bismar" weight used by the German community to work transactions to his advantage. In September 1580, the Earl of Orkney made arrangements to sell the butter, oil, and victual from the rental to a partnership formed by Janet Fockart, with three merchants James Dalziel, John Hamilton, and John Dick. Some of the produce was sold in Orkney, but some was to be sold at the markets of Leith, Dysart, Kirkcaldy, and Kinghorn.

== Sheriffs of Orkney and Shetland ==
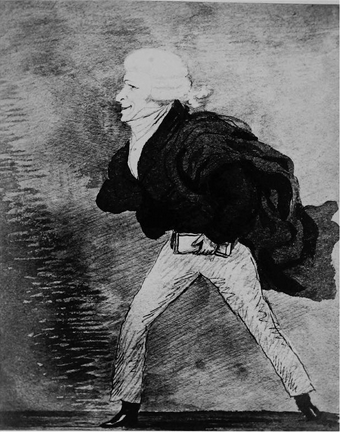
James Allan Maconochie

- Oliver Sinclair (sheriff).
- Olave Sinclair (foud)
- Robert Stewart (1564)
- Patrick Bellenden of Stenhouse, Sheriff of Orkney (1565).
- Gilbert Balfour of Westray, Sheriff of Orkney (1566).
- William Murray of Tullibardine, made foud, (1566).
- James Hepburn, 4th Earl of Bothwell (1567).
- Laurence Bruce (1571)
- John Dishington (1581-1610)
- James Stewart of Killeith, later Lord Ochiltree, (1610).
- John Buchanan (1620).
- Lt-Col. Patrick Blair 1663, 1669–1672

Sheriffs-Depute

- Edward Sinclair of Strom, Sheriff-Depute of Orkney, 1557.
- David Scollay.
- Robert Craigie, 1786–1791 (Sheriff of Dumfries, 1791–1811)
- Charles Hope, 1792–1801
- William Rae, 1801–1809 (Sheriff of Edinburgh, 1809)
- William Erskine, 1809–?1822 (died 1822)
- James Allan Maconochie, 1822–?1845 (died 1845)
- Charles Neaves, 1845–1852
- William Edmondstoune Aytoun, 1852–1865
- Adam Gifford, 1865–1870
- For sheriffs after 1870 see Sheriff of Caithness, Orkney and Shetland

== See also ==
- Historical development of Scottish sheriffdoms
