= South Havra =

Uninhabited island in the Scalloway Islands, Shetland, Scotland

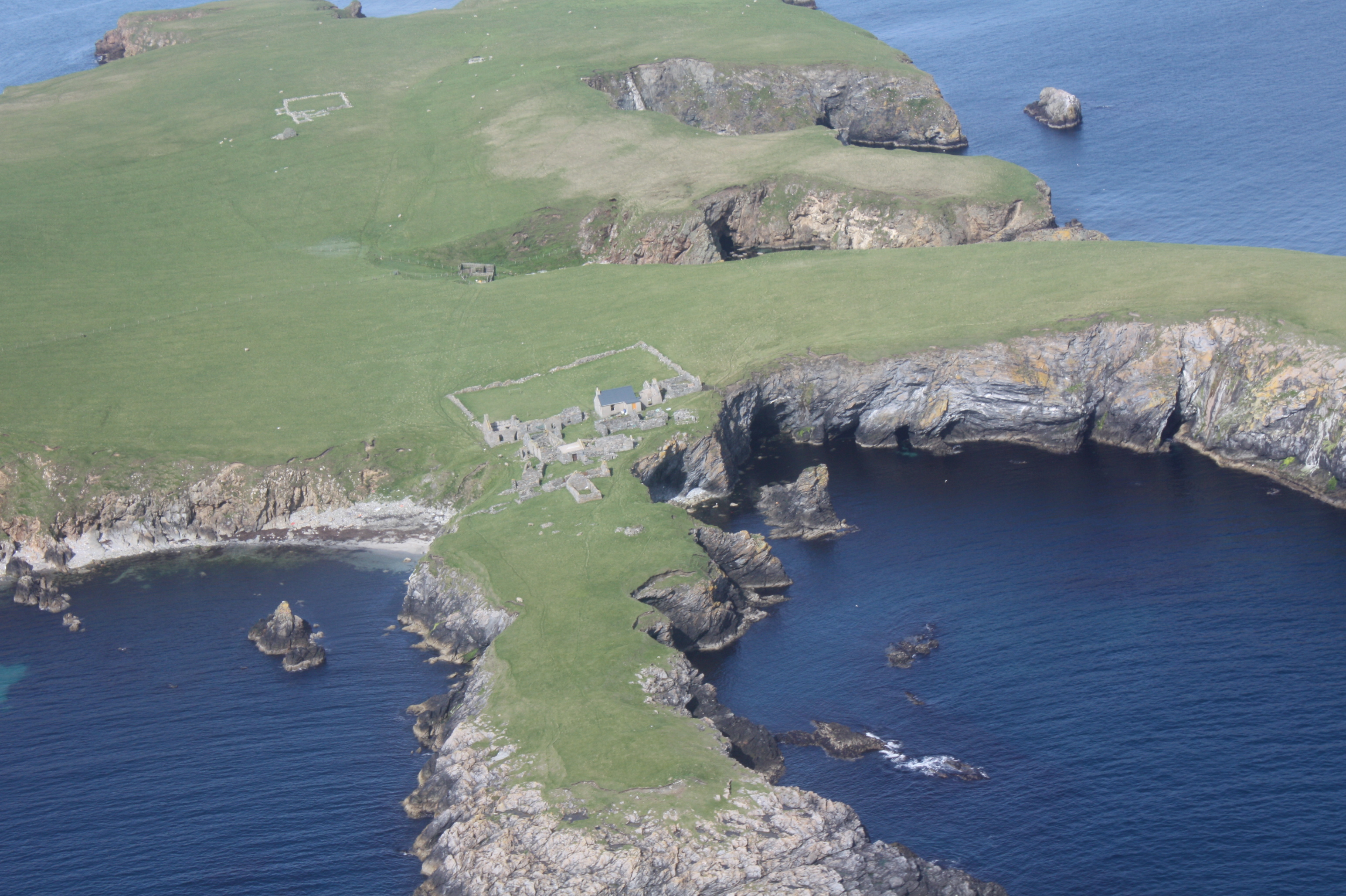
- Aerial view of South Havra

Location
- South Havra shown within Shetland
- OS grid reference: HU360268
- Coordinates: 60.03°N 1.35°W

Name
- Name meaning: "Ewe Island"
- Old Norse name: Hafrey

Physical geography
- Island group: Shetland
- Area: 59 ha (1/4 sq mi)
- Area rank: 183=
- Highest elevation: 42 m (138 ft)

Administration
- Council area: Shetland Islands
- Country: Scotland
- Sovereign state: United Kingdom

Demographics
- Population: 0

South Havra (Shaetlan pronunciation: [suθ'hevrə] sooth-HAY-vrə; Old Norse: Hafrey), is an uninhabited island in the Scalloway Islands, Shetland, Scotland.

== Geography and geology ==
South Havra lies south of Burra and west of the southern peninsula of the Mainland.

The island's rock is "epidiotic syenite with undifferentiated schist and gneiss."

The soil is fairly fertile, but the lack of running water meant that, unusually for Shetland, the islanders resorted to building a windmill to grind corn.

Geological features on the island include caves and natural arches.

Little Havra is to its west.

== History ==
Olaf Sinclair, foud (a kind of magistrate) of all Shetland lived here in the 16th century.

The island's ruined windmill is an unusual sight in the Shetland Islands, especially as some have pointed out, that the Dutch were amongst the archipelago's most frequent visitors.

At the censuses of 1871 and 1881 South Havra had a population of 32 and 35, respectively. The island has been uninhabited since 1923. Previously the population was big enough to support a school.
