= Alexander Durham =

Scottish courtier and administrator (died 1584)

Alexander Durham (died 1584) was a Scottish courtier and administrator.

== Career ==
His appointments included, clerk in the Exchequer, administrator of John Stewart of Coldingham, and Master of the Wardrobe to King James VI. His wife was also a member of the household. He was also known as "Sandy Durhame" or "Durame". Another member of the family, "Andrew" or Alexander Durham, worked in the spice house of the kitchen of Mary of Guise, and Michael Durham was the king's physician.

He bought white taffeta fabric used at the baptism of Mary, Queen of Scots. Durham was argentier or "argentar" to Mary of Guise and Mary, Queen of Scots. A record of food at court, the "Bread Book", mentions a meal in his chamber in December 1549.

In June 1547, Alexander Durham retrieved a valuable hat belonging to Mary of Guise from Marion Bruce in Stirling. The hat had originally been pledged for a loan or supplies bought for the royal household, and was now part of chain of credit in the sale of a house. Durham paid £100 Scots to Robert Forester of Kylemuk to redeem the hat. The velvet hat, with its gold trimmings, was described in the records of the burgh of Stirling, "ane hat of velvus, begareit all with chenyeis of gold, with a drawing chenyie and ane knop".

His role later included taking receipt of an income funding the royal household called the "thirds of benefices" derived from teinds. The money was collected by men working for the exchequer, like George Wishart of Drymme. From 1 October 1565 up to 2 January 1568 he received £4833-6s-8d on top of £23,351-13-4d already paid to him from the Thirds, for the expenses of the houses and "avery" (horse fodder) of Queen Mary and James VI of Scotland.

In August 1564 Durham took up a contribution of £124-10s-8d from Coupar Angus Abbey towards the expenses of the queen's hunting trip in Atholl and Glen Tilt and her journey to Inverness. Durham allocated £250 Scots for the members of the household who remained at Holyrood for two months while Mary went on progress.

He died in 1584 and was buried at the Holy Rude Kirk in Stirling.

== Alexander Durham, Lord Darnley's page ==
His son Alexander, also known as "Sandy Durham", was present at the Scottish court, a page to Lord Darnley. According to the confession of Nicolas Hubert alias French Paris, Mary wanted Gilbert Curle in her service to replace "Sande Duram" shortly before the murder of Lord Darnley. According to French Paris, Mary distrusted Durham. As a former servant of Lord Darnley in 1568, who was ready to work for James VI, being "of good mind to be employed to be employed in his minute and small affairs". He was made master of wardrobe of Prince James on 15 February 1567. Described as the late king's page, Alexander Durham was imprisoned in Edinburgh's tolbooth by Regent Moray in September 1567 on suspicion of involvement in Darnley's murder.

He became the "provisour" of the household of Regent Moray and of the king's household at Stirling Castle in the 1570s, and made a burgess of Stirling. Durham worked for Regent Moray in 1568, providing for his household. He made payments for Regent Moray, including a dowry or "tocher" given to Robert Porterfield when he married one the women appointed to rock the King's cradle at Stirling Castle.

In March 1572 Durham paid for cloth to make gown and smocks for six children, an Easter ceremony. The number of gowns matched the age of James VI. He arranged for harpers to play for James VI at Stirling Castle in June 1579. The family came to own and rebuild Duntarvie Castle.

== Family ==
Alexander Durham married Elizabeth Murray. Their children included:

- Alexander Durham younger, was a servant to Lord Darnley, and was bought green clothes in January 1566. In 1567 he was suspected of involvement in Darnley's murder. He was asked to bring a marten fur, a "couverture de maytres", a bedcover, from the Queen's chamber at the Kirk o'Field to Margaret Carwood. He may have been the father of Elizabeth Durham, who married William Baillie, Lord Provand
- James Durham of Duntarvie, a member of the royal household as clerk of expenses and a "daily servitour" who was suspected of involvement in the Raid of Holyrood in 1591. He served as Chamberlain for Linlithgowshire between 1595 and 1600. He married Margaret Hepburn. She was invited to wait on Anne of Denmark at her coronation in May 1590, and clothes were bought for James Durham to wear at the event. His daughter Janet Durham married James Durham of Pitkerrow (died 1633).

The main branch of the Durham family lived at the Grange of Monifieth (near Dundee). Eufame Durham (died 1580) was the wife of John Strachan or Strathauchin, the builder of Claypotts Castle. She was a sister of Robert Durham of the Grange of Monifeith.
