= Duchess of Sutherland =

Wife of the Duke of Sutherland

The Duchess of Sutherland is the wife of the Duke of Sutherland, an extant title in the Peerage of the United Kingdom which was created by William IV in 1833.

== Duchesses of Sutherland ==
- Elizabeth Leveson-Gower, Duchess of Sutherland (née Elizabeth Sutherland, 19th Countess of Sutherland; 1765–1839), wife of George Leveson-Gower, 1st Duke of Sutherland
- Harriet Sutherland-Leveson-Gower, Duchess of Sutherland (née Lady Harriet Howard; 1806–1868), wife of George Sutherland-Leveson-Gower, 2nd Duke of Sutherland
- Anne Sutherland-Leveson-Gower, Duchess of Sutherland (née Anne Hay-Mackenzie; 1829–1888), 1st wife of George Sutherland-Leveson-Gower, 3rd Duke of Sutherland
- Mary Caroline Blair (née Mitchell), 2nd wife of George Sutherland-Leveson-Gower, 3rd Duke of Sutherland
- Millicent Leveson-Gower, Duchess of Sutherland (née Lady Millicent St Clair-Erskine; 1867–1955), wife of George Sutherland-Leveson-Gower, 4th Duke of Sutherland
- Eileen Sutherland-Leveson-Gower, Duchess of Sutherland (née Lady Eileen Gwladys Butler; 1891–1943), 1st wife of George Sutherland-Leveson-Gower, 5th Duke of Sutherland
- Clare Sutherland-Leveson-Gower, Duchess of Sutherland (née Clare Josephine O'Brian), 2nd wife of George Sutherland-Leveson-Gower, 5th Duke of Sutherland
- Diana Egerton, Duchess of Sutherland (née Lady Diana Percy), 1st wife of John Egerton, 6th Duke of Sutherland
- Evelyn Egerton, Duchess of Sunderland (née Evelyn Moubray), 2nd wife of John Egerton, 6th Duke of Sutherland
- Victoria Egerton, Duchess of Sutherland (née Victoria Mary Williams), wife of Francis Egerton, 7th Duke of Sutherland
