= Lady Alice Egerton =

British courtier

Lady Alice Egerton CVO
- Born: 7 August 1923
- Died: 7 October 1977 (aged 54); Northumberland, England
- Father: John Egerton
- Relatives: Anne Egerton (sister); John Egerton (brother)

Lady Alice Egerton CVO (7 August 1923 – 7 October 1977) was a British courtier from the Egerton family.

Lady Alice was the youngest child of the 4th Earl of Ellesmere and his wife, Violet. In 1949, she replaced her sister, Lady Margaret Colville, as a Lady-in-Waiting to the then Princess Elizabeth and became a Woman of the Bedchamber in 1953. Lady Alice never married and remained in service to the Queen for the next 24 years.

In 1977, she was found dead in her home near Flodden Field in Northumberland; the suicide was claimed by some to have resulted from being dismissed from the Royal Household, allegedly for warning the Queen about Prince Philip's infidelity, although Lady Alice's family attribute it to her history of depression.
