= Mertoun House =

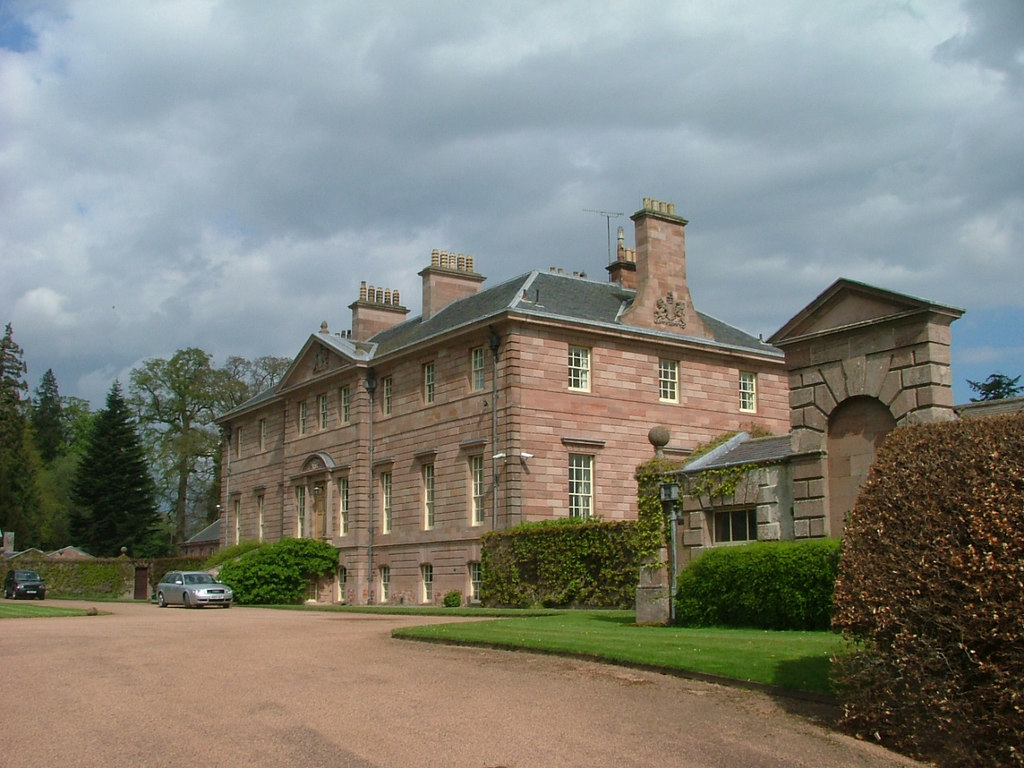
- Mertoun House

- Location of Mertoun House in the Scottish Borders
- 55.5777°N 2.6076°W
- Location: St Boswells, Scottish Borders, Scotland, United Kingdom

History
- Built for: William Scott

Site notes
- Architect: Sir William Bruce

Listed Building – Category A
- Designated: 9 June 1971
- Reference no.: LB15110

Inventory of Gardens and Designed Landscapes in Scotland
- Official name: Mertoun
- Criteria: Work of Art; Architectural
- Designated: 1 July 1987
- Reference no.: GDL00284

Mertoun House is a country house situated by the River Tweed, 2 miles (3 kilometres) east of St Boswells in the Scottish Borders. It is home to the Duke of Sutherland. The early 18th-century house is an A listed building, and was designed by Sir William Bruce. The gardens of the house are open to the public, and are included on the Inventory of Gardens and Designed Landscapes in Scotland, the national listing of significant gardens.

== History ==
Mertoun was a property of the Halliburton family, who sold it to Sir William Scott of Harden in around 1680. Old Mertoun House, dated 1677, was already in existence at this time, as was the 16th-century dovecote, which is also category-A listed. In 1703 work on a new house was begun by Sir William's grandson, to designs by Sir Willam Bruce. The builder was the master mason Tobias Bauchop of Alloa.

Around 1750 improvements were made to the house when Walter Scott of Mertoun married Lady Diana Hume Campbell, a daughter of the Earl of Marchmont. Their son Hugh was confirmed as Lord Polwarth in 1835, and Hugh's son Henry commissioned William Burn to design an extension to the south of the house. In the early 19th century the writer Sir Walter Scott, a kinsman of the Scotts of Mertoun, was a regular visitor, and composed "The Eve of St John" at Mertoun. Much of the present landscape garden around the house was laid by 1865, including the removal of a small village which lay north-west of the house, and the construction of the walled garden around Old Mertoun House.

The Scotts sold Mertoun in 1912 to John Egerton, Viscount Brackley (later 4th Earl of Ellesmere), who carried out alterations to the house and gardens. The property passed to his son, the 5th Earl of Ellesmere (1915–2000), who became 6th Duke of Sutherland in 1963. The house was reduced to its original size in 1956, by the architect Ian Gordon Lindsay, removing the 19th- and 20th-century additions.

In 1984 the Duke established the Mertoun Gardens Trust as a registered charity to run the 26-acre (11-hectare) gardens, which have been open to the public since. The house remains private, and is now the home of the 7th Duke of Sutherland.
