= Lady Anne Babington =

English noble

- Born: 26 March 1908
- Died: 15 July 1964 (aged 56)
- Spouse: Geoffrey Babington (m. 1931)
- Children: 3
- Parents: John Egerton, 4th Earl of Ellesmere (father); Lady Violet Lambton (mother)
- Relatives: John Egerton (brother); Alice Egerton (sister)

Lady Anne Katherine Babington (26 March 1908 – 15 July 1964) was a member of the English aristocracy.

== Life ==
Babington was born as Lady Anne Katherine Egerton on 26 March 1908. She was the daughter of John Francis Granville Scrope Egerton, 4th Earl of Ellesmere and Lady Violet Lambton, the eldest daughter of Frederick Lambton, 4th Earl of Durham. She had six siblings.

She married Captain Geoffrey Babington of the 16th/5th Lancers on 8 April 1931. They had three children:

- Ciro Anne (1932)
- David Henry Anthony (1936)
- and Margaret Angel (1943)

In 1947, she gave her address as Ascrevie. Babington died on 15 July 1964.

== See also ==
- Babington family
