= Hampden House, Mayfair =

Coordinates: 51°30′46″N 0°09′14″W

Hampden House
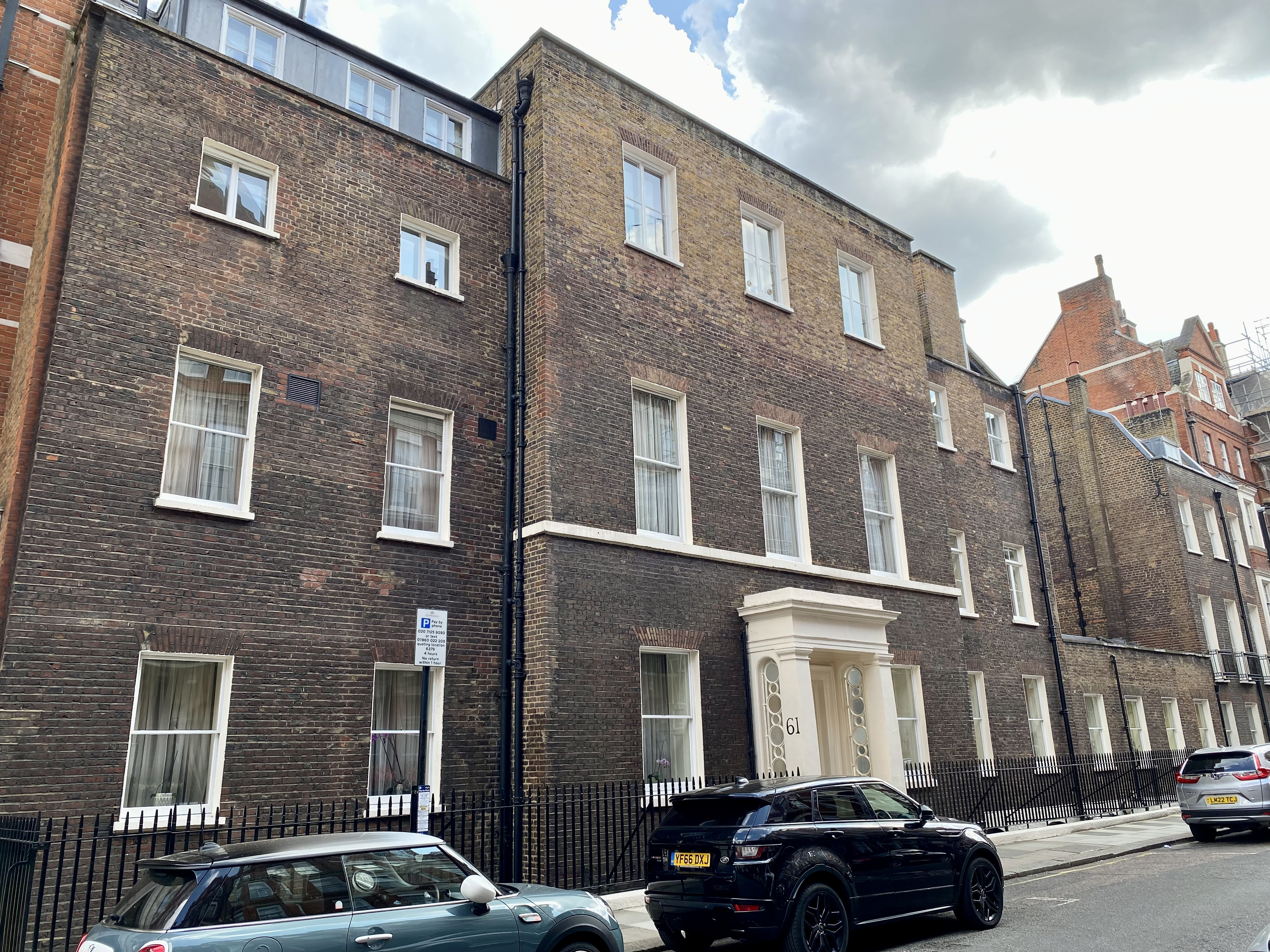
- Hampden House in June 2023

General information
- Architectural style: Palladian
- Classification: Grade II* listed
- Location: 61 Green Street, Mayfair, London, England
- Named for: Viscounts Hampden
- Year built: 1727–1730
- Owner: Grosvenor Estate

Design and construction
- Architect: Roger Morris

Hampden House is a Grade II* listed Palladian townhouse located at No. 61 Green Street in Mayfair, London. The existing house is an amalgamation of two houses at 60 and 61 Green Street, which have been occupied jointly since 1869. The freehold of the property forms part of the Grosvenor Estate in central London owned by the Dukes of Westminster. The house takes its name from its association with the Viscounts Hampden, who used it as their London townhouse from 1756 to 1833. The House later served as the London residence of the Dukes of Abercorn from 1869 to 1919, and then by the 5th Duke of Sutherland from 1919 until 1939. During the second half of the twentieth century the house was leased by the British Standards Institution as a conference centre.

== History and occupants ==
=== 61 Green Street ===
The eastern portion of the existing building (which was assigned the address 61 Green Street in 1884) was designed by the architect Roger Morris, who also was the property's first occupant. Construction of the house was carried out between 1727 and 1730, after which it remained as Morris' residence until his death in 1749.

In 1750 the house was sold by Morris' executors to the diplomat John Carmichael, 3rd Earl of Hyndford, who in turn later sold the house to The Hon. Robert Hampden-Trevor in 1756. Hampden-Trevor took up residence at the property from 1756 to 1759, after which the House was briefly leased to Robert Lane MP. Robert Hampden-Trevor succeeded his elder brother as the 4th Baron Trevor in 1764, and resumed his occupation of the house in 1765.

=== 60 Green Street ===
No. 60 Green Street was a comparatively modest house, built by James Richards. Richards was a craftsman who served in the Royal Household, rising to the office of Master Sculptor and Master Carver in Wood to the Office of Works in 1722.

Other houses occupied parts of the site of what was to become No. 60 Green Street, but none of these buildings survive. Following Richards' death in 1759 the house was sold to the carpenter John Spencer, who was employed as a builder by the Grosvenor Estate. Spencer was declared bankrupt in 1771, and in 1773 his creditors sold the property to the lessee of the neighbouring property at No. 61 Green Street, Robert Hampden-Trevor, 4th Baron Trevor.

=== Hampden House ===
In 1776 Robert Hampden-Trevor, 4th Baron Trevor was made Viscount Hampden, as his residence on Green Street became known as Hampden House; the name continued to be associated with the building thereafter.

The First Viscount Hampden died in 1783; his elder son Thomas, 2nd Viscount Hampden continued to maintain Hampden House as his London residence until his death in 1824. His widow retained the house until she died in 1833. 60 and 61 Green Street were subsequently sold by her executors to Thomas Hay-Drummond, 11th Earl of Kinnoull for £17,000. Lord Kinnoull used No. 61 Green Street as his London residence until 1857, and then leased the house to George Rice-Trevor, 4th Baron Dynevor until 1859. The house was then leased to Scottish landowner and politician Alexander Haldane Oswald, who later purchased the freehold of Nos. 60 and 61 Green Street from Lord Kinnoull in 1863; Oswald continued to live at No. 61 until he died in 1868.

==== Dukes of Abercorn ====
The House was purchased from Alexander Oswald's trustees in April 1869 by James Hamilton, 1st Duke of Abercorn, who amalgamated No 60 and 61. Following the Duke's death in 1885 his son James Hamilton, 2nd Duke of Abercorn maintained the property as the family's London house; by 1903 the Duke was seeking buyers for the lease, which then had an unexpired term of 17 years.

During a series of protracted negotiations over the proposed renewal and extension of the lease with the Board of the Grosvenor Estates, the 2nd Duke of Abercorn leased No. 35 Park Street, Mayfair from 1906 to 1908, and Hampden House was leased to the Chicago socialite Bertha Palmer (the widow of millionaire Potter Palmer). In 1904 Hugh Grosvenor, 2nd Duke of Westminster had set the price of renewal of the lease for a period of 63 years at £25,000 with an annual ground rent of £1,000, although the terms of the final agreement granted a renewal of the lease to the Duke of Abercorn for £10,000 with a term of 63 years and an annual ground rent of £850 in 1909.

The 2nd Duke of Abercorn maintained Hampden House as his London residence until his death in 1913, after which the lease was inherited by his son, James Hamilton, 3rd Duke of Abercorn. In 1914 Hampden House's annual rateable value for Property tax was £1,250.

==== Duke of Sutherland ====
In 1919 the 3rd Duke of Abercorn sold the lease of Hampden House to George Sutherland-Leveson-Gower, 5th Duke of Sutherland.

Sutherland had previously leased a much grander London home at Stafford House from the Crown Estate; however in 1912 he had sold his interest in Stafford House to Sir William Lever, 1st Bt. During the 1920s the Duke made various improvements and extensions to the house, including the installation of a ballroom. The house could reportedly accommodate up to seven-hundred guests during the interwar period.

Hampden House continued to function as the Duke of Sutherland's London house until the outbreak of the World War II, after which the Duke closed the house and leased Sutton Place in Guildford, Surrey.

==== World War II ====
Following the death of Eileen Sutherland-Leveson-Gower, Duchess of Sutherland in 1943 the Duke sold much of the furniture which had been used at Hampden House (much of which had been transferred from the family's previous London residence, Stafford House). In 1944 The Evening Standard reported that the Duke did not expect to reinstate Hampden House as his London residence. During the Second World War the house was requisitioned by the British Government, and continued to be under requisition used for Government offices in January 1946.

=== Institutional use ===
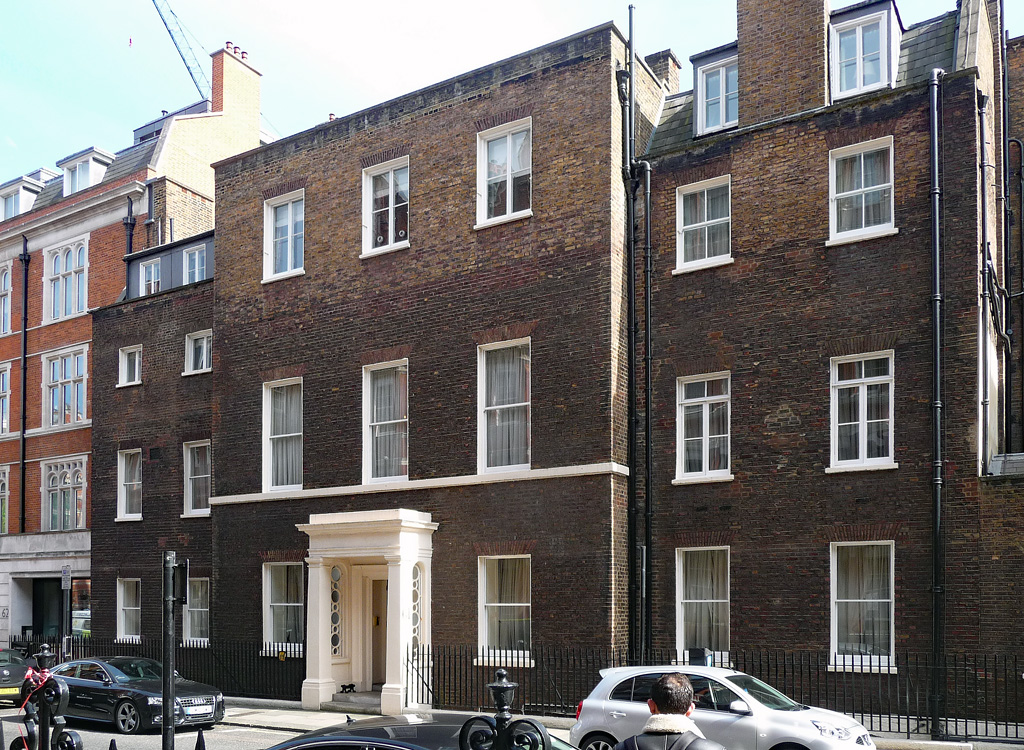
Hampden House from Green Street

The Duke of Sutherland sold the lease of Hampden House in March 1947 to Cone-Ripman Schools; The Daily Telegraph reported that the sale price of the lease was approximately £30,000.

By January 1949 the lease of Hampden House was again advertised for sale.

The lease of Hampden House was acquired by the British Standards Institution in 1963 as a conference centre; the BSI continued to use the property during the early 1980s.

== Architecture ==
Hampden House has been described as an attempt by its architect, Roger Morris "to express the idiom of the Palladian villa in the language of London street architecture."
