= John Egerton, 4th Earl of Ellesmere =

British peer and soldier

Lieutenant-Colonel John Francis Granville Scrope Egerton, 4th Earl of Ellesmere, MVO, K.StJ (14 November 1872 – 24 August 1944) was a British hereditary peer and soldier from the Egerton family, known as Viscount Brackley before 1914.

== Early life ==
Lord Ellesmere was born in 1872, the eldest son of Francis Egerton, 3rd Earl of Ellesmere and his wife Lady Katherine Phipps, daughter of George Phipps, 2nd Marquess of Normanby. He succeeded to the earldom and the viscountcy upon his father's death in 1914.

== Military career ==
Ellesmere was appointed a captain in the part-time 3rd (Edinburgh Light Infantry Militia) Battalion, Royal Scots, on 10 March 1894. The battalion was embodied in December 1899 and in early March 1900 left Queenstown on the SS Oriental for South Africa to serve in the Boer War. Lord Brackley and most of the battalion left Cape Town for the United Kingdom in early May 1902, shortly before the end of the war. After his return, he was appointed Aide-de-camp to Sir William Knox, Commander, Royal Artillery, for 3rd Army Corps. His battalion later became the 3rd (Reserve) Battalion, Royal Scots, in the Special Reserve and he was promoted to its command as lieutenant-colonel on 11 November 1912. He was in command when it was embodied at the outbreak of World War I and served with it during the war, when he was mentioned in despatches.

== Cricket ==
A cricketer, he captained his own side to the West Indies in the winter of 1904–05.

== Marriage and children ==
On 28 October 1905, he married Lady Violet Lambton, eldest daughter of Frederick Lambton, 4th Earl of Durham. They had seven children:

- Lady Anne Katherine Egerton (1908 - 15 July 1964), married Geoffrey Babington
- Lady Jane Mary Egerton (22 September 1909 – 27 July 1978), married Richard Scrope
- Lady Mary Egerton (born 1911), married Lt Col Conyers Scrope
- Lady Susan Alice Egerton (1913 – 29 April 2010), married Major John Askew
- John Sutherland Egerton, 6th Duke of Sutherland, 5th Earl of Ellesmere (10 May 1915 – 21 September 2000)
- Lady Margaret Egerton (1918 – 2004), married Sir Jock Colville
- Lady Alice Egerton (1923 – 1977)

Ellesmere sold his father's seat, St George's Hill House and its 964-acre estate to master builder W. G. Tarrant, who went on to create Surrey's landmark St George's Hill estate. He purchased Hatchford End on the family's former estate at Hatchford Park for his unmarried sisters Lady Mabel Egerton, Lady Alice Egerton and Lady Leila Egerton. He and his wife moved to Burwood House in Surrey, now Notre Dame School.

== Death ==
Lord Ellesmere died on 24 August 1944, at the age of 71. He was succeeded in the earldom and viscountcy by his only son, John who, in 1963, also succeeded his third cousin once removed George Sutherland-Leveson-Gower, 5th Duke of Sutherland in the dukedom.

Peerage of the United Kingdom
Preceded by Francis Egerton	Earl of Ellesmere; 1914–1944	Succeeded by John Egerton
