= Duke of Sutherland =

Title in the peerage of the United Kingdom

Dukedom of Sutherland
- Arms of Egerton, Dukes of Sutherland: Argent, a lion rampant gules between three pheons sable
- Creation date: 14 January 1833
- Created by: King William IV
- Peerage: Peerage of the United Kingdom
- First holder: George Leveson-Gower, 2nd Marquess of Stafford
- Present holder: Francis Egerton, 7th Duke of Sutherland
- Heir apparent: James Granville Egerton, Marquess of Stafford
- Remainder to: the 1st Duke's heirs male of the body lawfully begotten
- Subsidiary titles: Marquess of Stafford; Earl Gower; Earl of Ellesmere; Viscount Trentham; Viscount Brackley; Baron Gower
- Seat: Mertoun House
- Former seats: Lilleshall Hall; Trentham Hall; Dunrobin Castle; Cliveden; Stafford House

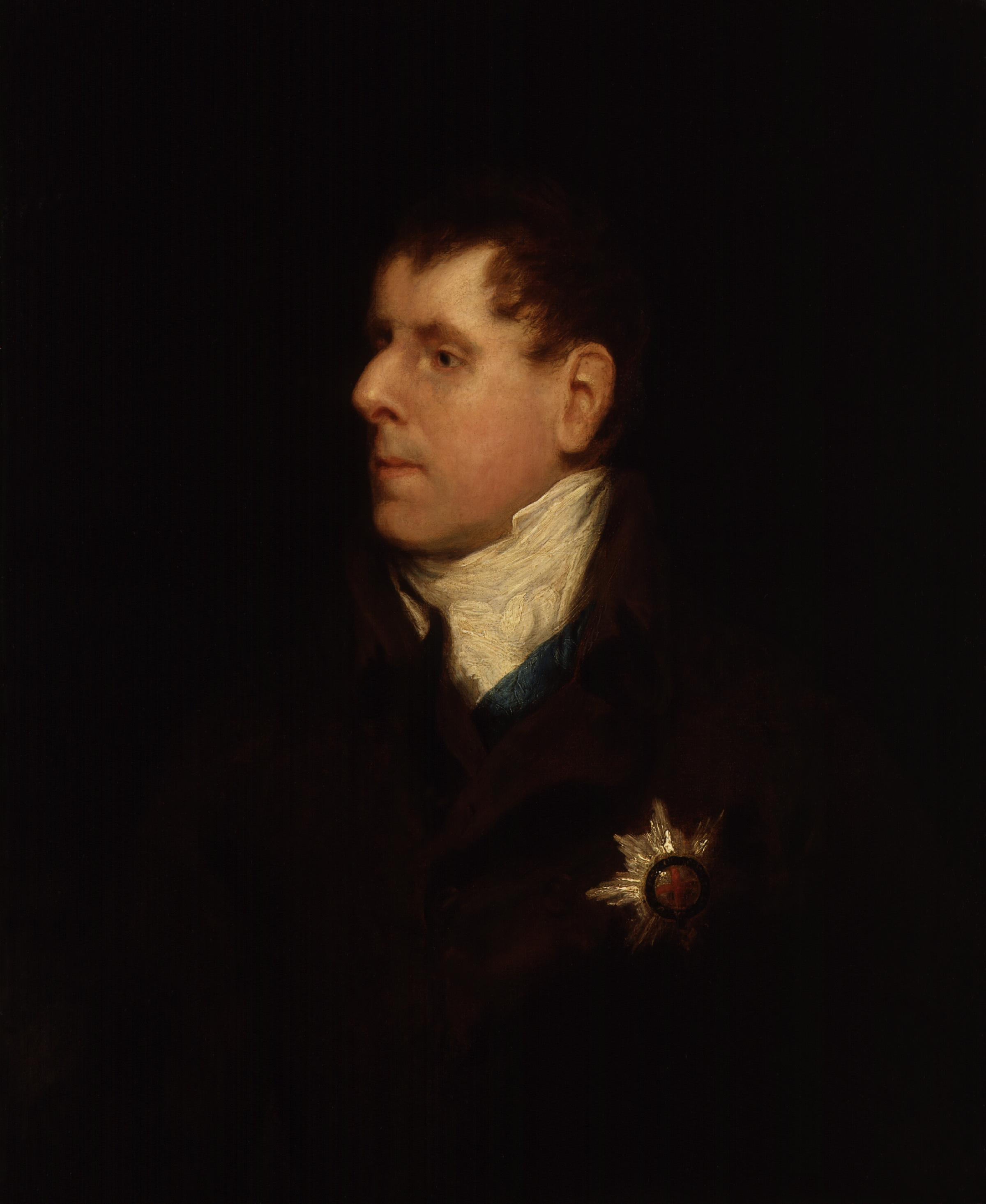
George Leveson-Gower, 1st Duke of Sutherland, by Thomas Phillips

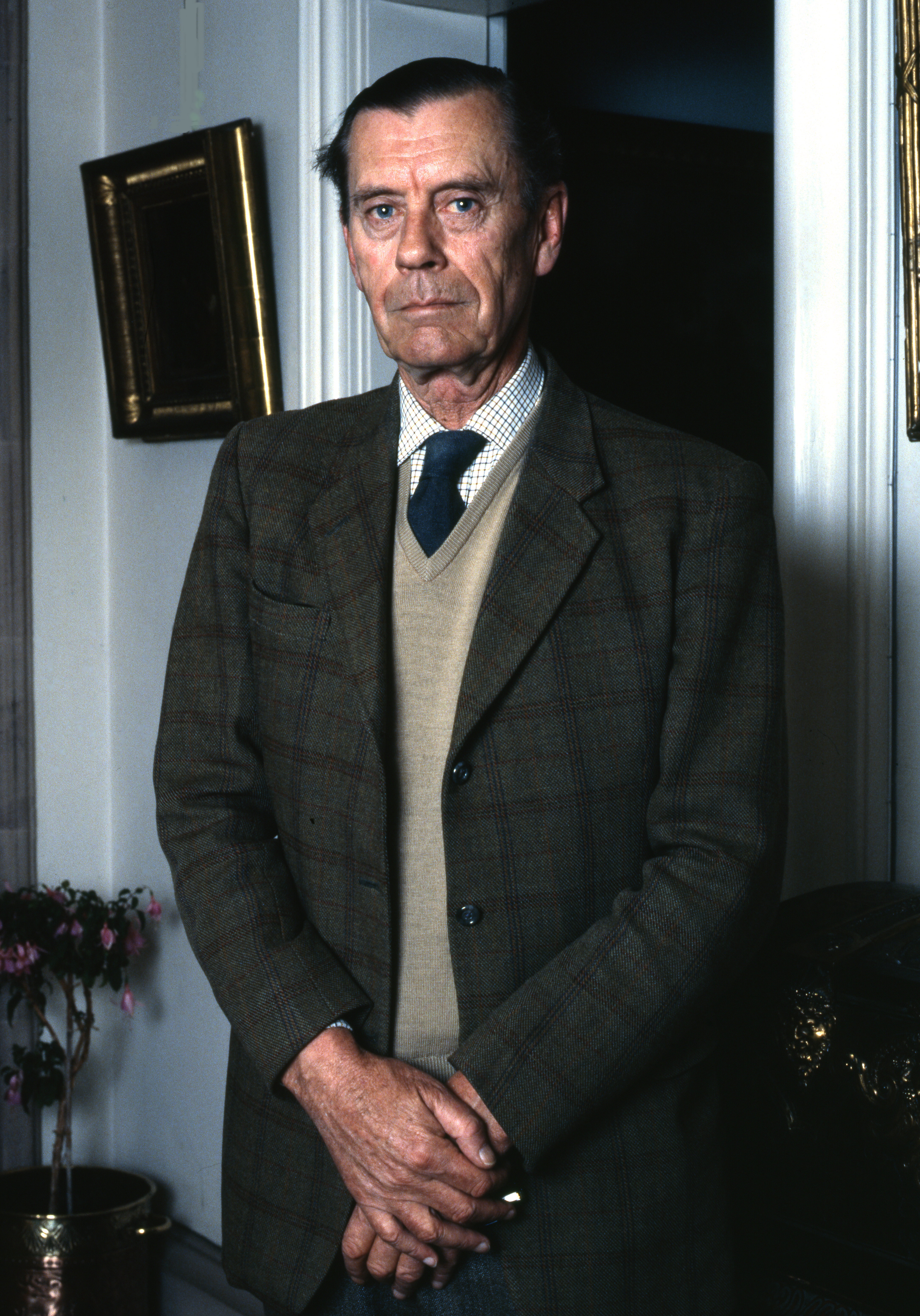
John Egerton, 6th Duke of Sutherland, by Allan Warren

Duke of Sutherland is a title in the Peerage of the United Kingdom which was created by William IV in 1833 for George Leveson-Gower, 2nd Marquess of Stafford. A series of marriages to heiresses by members of the Leveson-Gower family made the dukes of Sutherland one of the richest landowning families in the United Kingdom. The title remained in the Leveson-Gower family until the death of the 5th Duke of Sutherland in 1963, when it passed to the 5th Earl of Ellesmere from the Egerton family.

The subsidiary titles of the Duke of Sutherland are Marquess of Stafford (created 1786), Earl Gower (1746), Earl of Ellesmere, of Ellesmere in the County of Shropshire (1846), Viscount Trentham, of Trentham in the County of Stafford (1746), Viscount Brackley, of Brackley in the County of Northampton (1846), and Baron Gower, of Stittenham in the County of York (1703). The marquessate of Stafford, the earldom of Gower and the viscountcy of Trentham are in the Peerage of Great Britain, the dukedom, the earldom of Ellesmere and the viscountcy of Brackley in the Peerage of the United Kingdom, and the barony of Gower in the Peerage of England.

The Duke is also a Baronet, of Stittenham in the County of York, a title created in the Baronetage of England in 1620. Between 1839 and 1963 the Dukes also held the titles of Lord Strathnaver and Earl of Sutherland, both in the Peerage of Scotland. The Scottish titles came into the family through the marriage of the first Duke to Elizabeth Sutherland, 19th Countess of Sutherland.

== Family history ==
Thomas Gower was created a baronet, of Stittenham in the County of York, by James I of England in 1620. This title was in the Baronetage of England. His son Thomas, the second Baronet, married Frances, daughter of John Leveson. Their grandson William, the fourth Baronet (who succeeded his unmarried elder brother), assumed the additional surname of Leveson. William married Lady Jane (d. 1696), daughter of John Granville, 1st Earl of Bath and sister of Grace Carteret, 1st Countess Granville (see Earl Granville). Their son John, the fifth Baronet, was raised to the Peerage of England as Baron Gower, of Stittenham in the County of York, in 1706. His son, the second Baron, served three times as Lord Privy Seal. In 1746 he was created Viscount Trentham, of Trentham in the County of Stafford, and Earl Gower. Both titles are in the Peerage of Great Britain.

His eldest surviving son from his first marriage, Granville, the second Earl, was also a prominent politician. In 1786 he was created Marquess of Stafford in the Peerage of Great Britain. Lord Stafford married secondly Lady Louisa Egerton, daughter of Scroop Egerton, 1st Duke of Bridgewater. His son from his third marriage to Lady Susanna Stewart, Granville Leveson-Gower, 1st Earl Granville, was created Earl Granville in 1833, a revival of the title created for his great-great-aunt in 1715.

Lord Stafford was succeeded by his eldest son from his second marriage, George. He married Elizabeth Sutherland, 19th Countess of Sutherland. In 1803 he succeeded to the vast estates of his maternal uncle Francis Egerton, 3rd Duke of Bridgewater. In 1833 he was created Duke of Sutherland in the Peerage of the United Kingdom for his support for the Reform Act 1832.

== Clearances ==
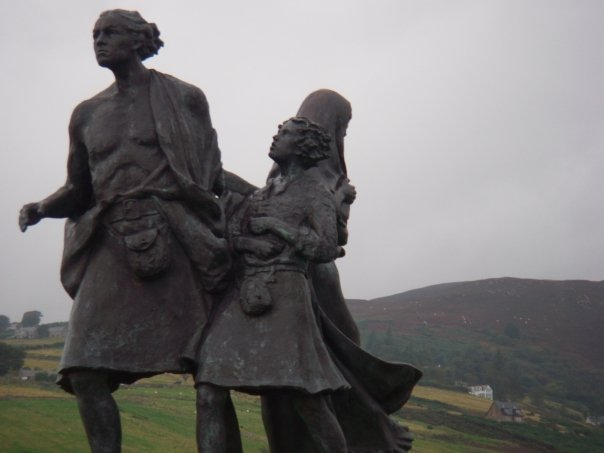
The Emigrants Statue commemorates the flight of Highlanders during the Highland Clearances, but is also a testament to their accomplishments in the places they settled. Located in the Sutherland village of Helmsdale, Scotland.

The 1st Duke and Duchess of Sutherland remain controversial for their role in the Highland Clearances, when thousands of tenants were evicted and resettled in coastal villages. This allowed the vacated land to be used for extensive sheep farming, replacing the mixed farming carried out by the previous occupants. This was part of the Scottish Agricultural Revolution.

The changes on the Sutherland estate was motivated by one major objective: to increase the rental income from the estate, as sheep farmers could afford much higher rents.

The future 1st Duke became the proprietor of the Sutherland Estate (which comprised much of the county of Sutherland) on his marriage to Lady Elizabeth Sutherland, the Countess of Sutherland, in 1785. Despite the conventions of the day, Lady Sutherland (Note: The first Duchess of Sutherland was known by several different names as she acquired titles throughout her life. She was the Countess of Sutherland from the age of 1, and continued to be known by that title by her tenants. Later she was the Marchioness of Stafford (from her husband's title) and became the Duchess-Countess of Sutherland when her husband became Duke. Fortunately, throughout this time, she was often referred to simply as Lady Sutherland.) retained control of the management of the estate, rather than passing this responsibility to her husband.

The Sutherland Clearances did not start until the 19th century, mainly due to insufficient capital – a problem that was solved when, in 1803, George Leveson-Gower, the future 1st Duke inherited a huge fortune from the Duke of Bridgewater. The remaining delay was that many leases did not expire until 1807 or later, but plans were put together for the interior of the estate to be devoted to large sheep farms, with new settlements to be built for the displaced inhabitants. A tentative start was made to this with the letting of the first big sheep farm at Lairg in 1807, involving the removal of about 300 people. Many of these did not accept their new homes and emigrated, to the dissatisfaction of the estate management and Lady Sutherland.

Lady Sutherland was not happy with the estate factor and, in 1811, replaced him with William Young and Patrick Sellar. (Note: There was some ambiguity over the precise roles of these two men. At one stage of the recruitment process, they arguably had equal and independent powers. This shifted to Young having the role of commissioner and Sellar being factor, so placing Young in overall control. This process involved much argument from Sellar, with Lady Sutherland considering seeking his resignation before he had even completed a year in the position.) Young had a proven track record of agricultural improvement in Moray and Sellar was a lawyer educated at the University of Edinburgh; both were fully versed in the modern ideas of Adam Smith. They provided an extra level of ambition for the estate. New industries were added to the plans, to employ the resettled population. A coal mine was sunk at Brora, and fishing villages were built to exploit the herring shoals off the coast. Other ideas were tanning, flax, salt and brick manufacturing.

The next clearances were in Assynt in 1812, under the direction of Sellar, establishing large sheep farms and resettling the old tenants on the coast. Sellar had the assistance of the local tacksmen in this and the process was conducted without unrest – despite the unpopularity of events. However, in 1813, planned clearances in the Strath of Kildonan were accompanied by riots: an angry mob drove prospective sheep farmers out of the valley when they came to view the land, and a situation of confrontation existed for more than six weeks, with Sellar failing to successfully negotiate with the protesters. Ultimately, the army was called out and the estate made concessions such as paying very favourable prices for the cattle of those being cleared. This was assisted by landlords in surrounding districts taking in some of those displaced and an organised party emigrating to Canada. The whole process was a severe shock to Lady Sutherland and her advisers, who were, in the words of historian Eric Richards, "genuinely astonished at this response to plans which they regarded as wise and benevolent".

Further clearances were scheduled in Strathnaver starting at Whitsun, 1814. These were complicated by Sellar having successfully bid for the lease of one of the new sheep farms on land that it was now his responsibility, as factor, to clear. (Overall, this clearance was part of the removal of 430 families from Strathnaver and Brora in 1814 – an estimated 2,000 people.) Sellar had also made an enemy of the local law officer, Robert Mackid, by catching him poaching on the Sutherlands' land. There was some confusion among the tenants as Sellar made concessions to some of them, allowing them to stay in their properties a little longer. Some tenants moved in advance of the date in their eviction notice – others stayed until the eviction parties arrived.

As was normal practice, the roof timbers of cleared houses were destroyed to prevent re-occupation after the eviction party had left. On 13 June 1814, this was done by burning in the case of Badinloskin, the house occupied by William Chisholm. Accounts vary, but it is possible that his elderly and bedridden mother-in-law was still in the house when it was set on fire. In James Hunter's understanding of events, Sellar ordered her to be immediately carried out as soon as he realised what was happening. The old lady died six days later. Eric Richards suggests that the old woman was carried to an outbuilding before the house was destroyed. Whatever the facts of the matter, Sellar was charged with culpable homicide and arson, in respect of this incident and others during this clearance. The charges were brought by Robert Mackid.

As the trial approached, the Sutherland estate was reluctant to assist Sellar in his defence, distancing themselves from their employee. He was acquitted of all charges at his trial in 1816. The estate were hugely relieved, taking this as a justification of their clearance activity. (Robert Mackid became a ruined man and had to leave the county to rebuild his career elsewhere, providing Sellar with a grovelling letter of apology and confession.)

Despite the acquittal, this event, and Sellar's role in it, was fixed in the popular view of the Sutherland Clearances. James Loch, the Stafford estate commissioner was now taking a greater interest in the Northern part of his employer's holdings; he thought Young's financial management was incompetent, and Sellar's actions among the people deeply concerning. Both Sellar and William Young soon left their management posts with the Sutherland estate (though Sellar remained as a major tenant). Loch, nevertheless, also subscribed to the theory that clearance was beneficial for the tenants as much as for the estate.

Lady Sutherland's displeasure with events was added to by critical reports in a minor London newspaper, the Military Register, from April 1815. These were soon carried in larger newspapers. They originated from Alexander Sutherland, who, with his brother John Sutherland of Sciberscross, (Note: The territorial designation after his name denotes that the Sutherland brothers were members of the daoine uaisle or tacksman class, sometimes described as 'gentry'.) were opponents of clearance. Alexander, after serving as a captain in the army had been thwarted in his hopes to take up leases on the Sutherland estate and now worked as a journalist in London. He was therefore well placed to cause trouble for the estate.

The (effective) dismissal of Sellar placed him in the role of scapegoat, thereby preventing a proper critical analysis of the estate's policies. Clearances continued under the factorship of Frances Suther and the overall control of James Loch. Through 1816 and 1817, famine conditions affected most of the inland areas and the estate had to provide relief to those who were destitute. This altered policy on emigration: if tenants wanted to emigrate, the estate would not object, but there was still no active encouragement.

In 1818 a large (perhaps the largest) clearance program was put into effect, lasting until 1820. Loch gave emphatic instructions intended to avoid another public relations disaster: rent arrears could be excused for those who co-operated, time was to be taken and rents for the new crofts were to be set as low as possible.

The process did not start well. The Reverend David Mackenzie of Kildonan wrote to Loch on behalf of the 220 families due to be cleared from his parish. He challenged the basic premise of the clearance: that the people from an inland region could make a living on their new coastal crofts. Loch was adamant that the removals would go ahead regardless of objections. Yet, at the same time, Suther and the local ground officer of the estate were pointing out to Loch that few of the new crofts were of an acceptable quality. Some tenants were considering moving off the estate, either to Caithness or emigrating to America or the Cape of Good Hope, which Suther encouraged by writing off their rent arrears. More positively, cattle prices were high in 1818. Ultimately, that year's clearances passed without serious protest.

The next two years had much bigger clearances: 425 families (about 2,000 people) in 1819 and 522 families in 1820. Loch was anxious to move quickly, whilst cattle prices were high and there was a good demand for leases of sheep farms. There was no resistance in 1819, but Suther, despite precise instructions to the contrary, used fire to destroy cleared houses.

== Estates and residences ==
=== Country Seats ===
The current seat of Francis Egerton, 7th Duke of Sutherland is Mertoun House in St. Boswells, in the Scottish Borders.

The family seat was originally Lilleshall Hall and later, grander, family seats included Trentham Hall, Dunrobin Castle, and Cliveden. The traditional burial place of the Dukes of Sutherland from the Leveson-Gower family was Trentham Mausoleum, a grade I listed mausoleum in Trentham, Stoke-on-Trent.

=== Estates and landholdings ===
In the 1883 edition of John Bateman's The Great Landowners of Great Britain and Ireland, George Sutherland-Leveson-Gower, 3rd Duke of Sutherland's estates were recorded as spanning 1,358,545 acres across Scotland and England, including 1,176,454 acres in Sutherland, 149,999 acres in Ross-shire, 17,495 acres in Shropshire, 12,744 acres in Staffordshire, and 1,853 acres in the North Riding of Yorkshire, which produced a combined annual income of £141,667.

Bateman noted that almost all of the Ross-shire estate belonged to the Duke's wife, Anne, Duchess of Sutherland.

==== Bridgewater inheritance ====
A substantial part of the wealth later associated with the Egerton branch of the Sutherland family derived from Francis Egerton, 3rd Duke of Bridgewater, the maternal uncle of George Leveson-Gower, 1st Duke of Sutherland. On Bridgewater's death unmarried in 1803, his dukedom became extinct, while his canal interests and extensive landed and industrial properties were placed under the Bridgewater Trust. Under the terms of the will, George Leveson-Gower, 2nd Marquess of Stafford (later 1st Duke of Sutherland) became the first life-tenant of the Bridgewater Trust, with the property thereafter to pass to Lord Stafford's younger son Lord Francis Leveson-Gower and his descendants.

On his father's death in 1833, Lord Francis succeeded as beneficiary of the Bridgewater estates, including the large estate centred on Worsley in Lancashire, and assumed by royal licence the surname and arms of Egerton in place of Leveson-Gower. The inheritance also included substantial estates in Lancashire, Cheshire and Northamptonshire, together with collieries, wharves and other industrial interests connected with the Bridgewater Canal. At Worsley, Egerton commissioned Worsley New Hall from Edward Blore; construction began in 1839 and the house was completed in 1846, the same year in which Egerton was created Earl of Ellesmere and Viscount Brackley.

Although successive Earls of Ellesmere enjoyed the Bridgewater property, much of it remained formally administered by the Bridgewater trustees under the unusually long-lived settlement created by the 3rd Duke's will. The trust finally expired in 1903, a century after Bridgewater's death, at which point Francis Egerton, 3rd Earl of Ellesmere obtained full control of the remaining Bridgewater estates and collieries. The estates were substantially broken up in the following generation. Faced with heavy death duties after succeeding in 1914, John Egerton, 4th Earl of Ellesmere disposed of the Brackley estate and much of the family's Lancashire and Cheshire industrial property; Worsley New Hall and its estate were subsequently sold to Bridgewater Estates Ltd in 1923.

The Ellesmere branch ultimately inherited the dukedom of Sutherland itself. On the death without male issue of George Sutherland-Leveson-Gower, 5th Duke of Sutherland in 1963, his third-cousin-once-removed John Sutherland Egerton, 5th Earl of Ellesmere, a great-great-grandson of the 1st Duke of Sutherland through Lord Francis, succeeded as 6th Duke of Sutherland. The earldom of Ellesmere and viscountcy of Brackley consequently became subsidiary titles of the dukedom.

A major surviving component of the Bridgewater inheritance is the Bridgewater Collection of Old Master paintings. Its core was assembled by the 3rd Duke of Bridgewater following the dispersal of the Orléans Collection during the French Revolution and passed with other Bridgewater property through the Sutherland family to the Ellesmere branch. In 1945 the future 6th Duke, then the 5th Earl of Ellesmere, placed a group of the collection's most important works on long-term loan to the National Galleries of Scotland, including paintings by Raphael, Titian, Nicolas Poussin and Rembrandt. Several works have subsequently entered public ownership, including Titian's Venus Anadyomene in 2003 and Diana and Actaeon in 2009, while other works from the collection have remained on loan to the National Galleries of Scotland.

=== London residences ===
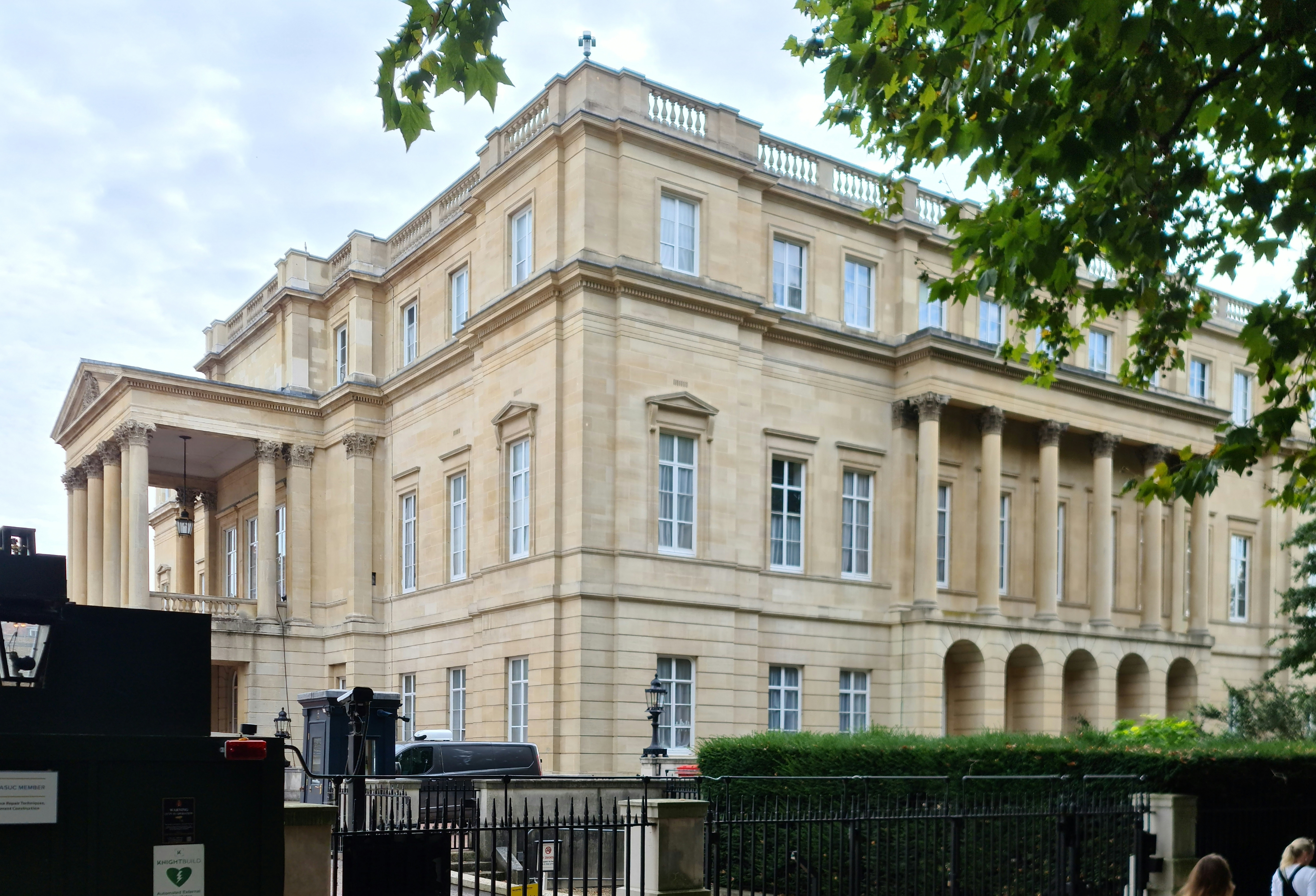
Stafford House, the London residence of the Dukes of Sutherland from 1838 until 1912.

==== Stafford House, The Mall ====
In 1838 George Leveson-Gower, 2nd Marquess of Stafford (later 1st Duke of Sutherland) purchased the leasehold of the unfinished York House from the Crown Estate. York House had been intended to serve as a London residence for the heir-presumptive to the Throne Prince Frederick, Duke of York and Albany. Construction of York House had commenced in 1825, although the building was still a shell when the Duke of York died in 1827. Lord Stafford oversaw the completion of the House from 1833 to 1838. In 1841 Lord Stafford paid £72,000 for a new 99-year lease of the property; the purchase price reportedly took into account the significant expense which Stafford had incurred on building work to complete the construction of the house, which was subsequently known as Stafford House for almost a century.

Stafford House was widely regarded as being amongst the grandest of the palatial townhouses of the British Aristocracy which adorned London during the 19th century; during a visit to Stafford House, Queen Victoria is said to have remarked to the 2nd Duchess of Sutherland "I have come from my House to your Palace."

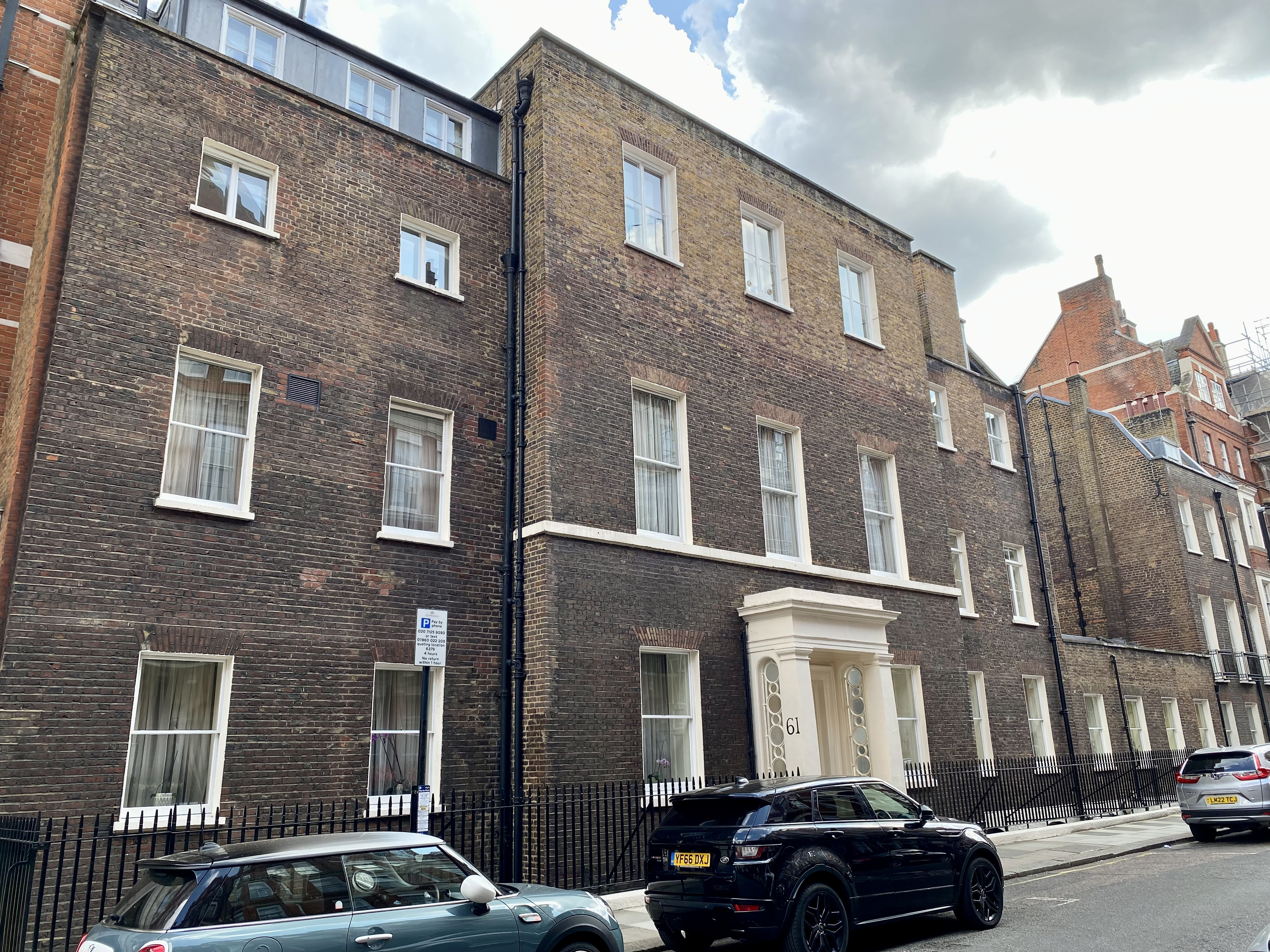
Hampden House, the London residence of the 5th Duke of Sutherland from 1919 to 1939

Stafford House served as the family's London residence until 1912, when Cromartie Sutherland-Leveson-Gower, 4th Duke of Sutherland sold the lease to the industrialist and philanthropist Sir William Lever, 1st Baronet (later 1st Viscount Leverhulme). Sir William subsequently changed the building's name to "Lancaster House" honour of his native county of Lancashire, and presented the house to the nation during the following year.

==== Hampden House, Green Street ====
In 1919 the 5th Duke of Sutherland purchased the lease of Hampden House, 61 Green Street, Mayfair from James Hamilton, 3rd Duke of Abercorn, and used the house as his London residence until the outbreak of War in 1939; the 5th Duke later sold the lease in 1947.

==== 33 Wilton Crescent ====
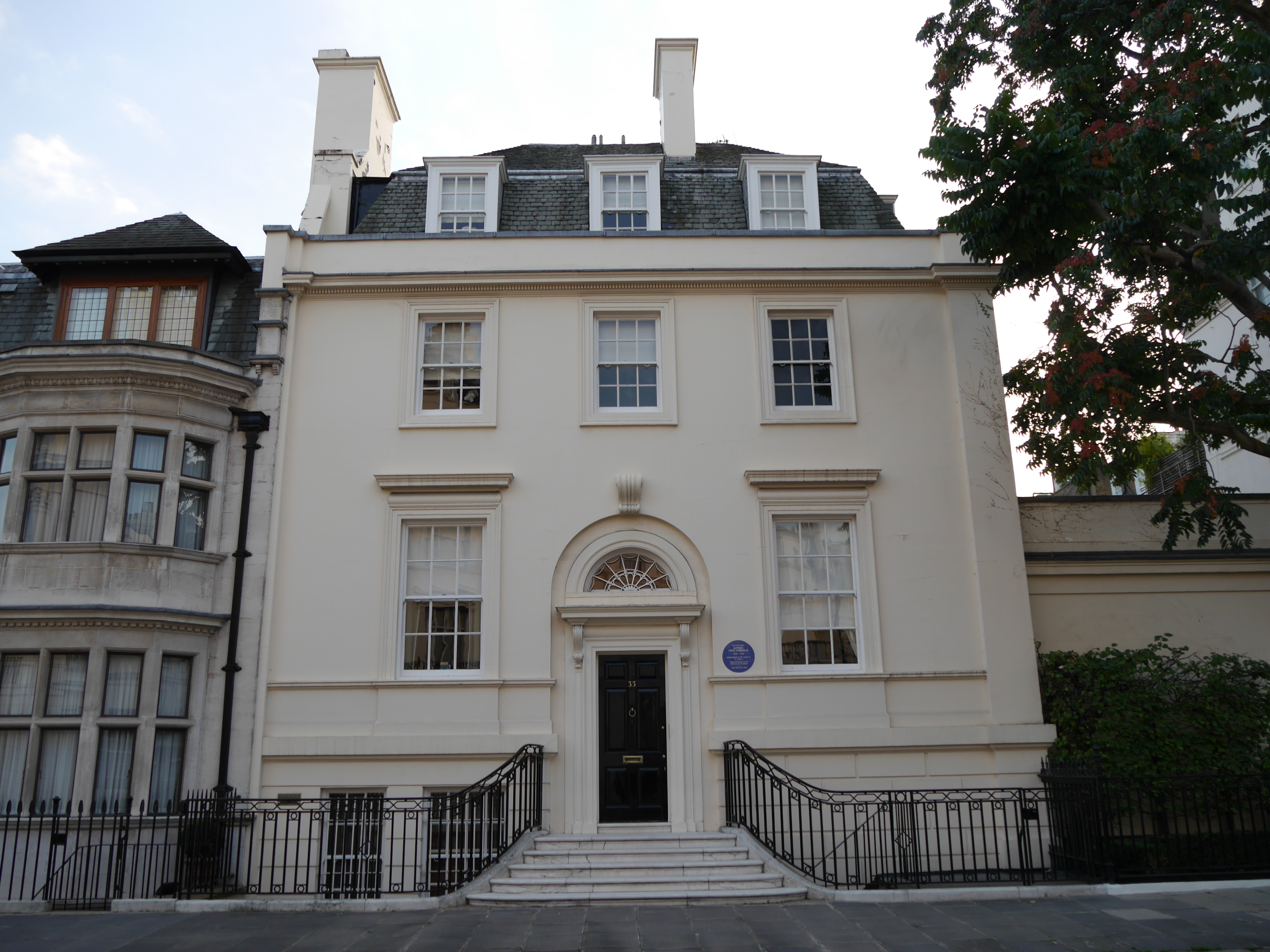
33 Wilton Crescent

In April 1950 the 5th Duke of Sutherland purchased No. 33 Wilton Crescent, Belgravia from Patrick Plunket, 7th Baron Plunket. The property, held on a 999-year lease from the Grosvenor Estate, remained as the Duke's London house throughout the 1950s, though the house was sublet to Alfonso López Pumarejo in the later part of the decade. Following Pumarejo's death in 1959, the house was advertised as being available for lease for a weekly rent of £105. By 1961 the Duke had returned to Wilton Crescent; following his death in 1963 his widowed second wife Clare, Duchess of Sutherland continued to reside at the house. By July 1966 she was attempting to sell the leasehold of the house, with an asking price of £100,000; in early 1967 33 Wilton Crescent was sold to Sir Gawaine George Hope Baillie, 7th Baronet.

== Other family members ==
William Gower, youngest son of William the fourth Baronet, was Member of Parliament for Ludlow.

William Leveson-Gower, second son of John, first Baron Gower and grandson of the fourth Baronet, was Member of Parliament for Stafford. Thomas Leveson-Gower, third son of the first Baron, was Member of Parliament for Newcastle-under-Lyme. Baptist Leveson-Gower, fourth son of the first Baron, was also Member of Parliament for Newcastle-under-Lyme.

Richard Leveson-Gower, fourth son of the first Earl, was Member of Parliament for Lichfield. John Leveson-Gower (1740–1792), sixth son of the first Earl, was an Admiral in the Royal Navy.

Frederick Neville Sutherland Leveson-Gower, son of Lord Albert Leveson-Gower, younger son of the second Duke, sat as Member of Parliament for Sutherland. Lord Ronald Gower, youngest son of the second Duke, was a politician, sculptor and writer.

Henry 'Shrimp' Leveson Gower, was born in Titsey Place near Oxted in Surrey, the seventh of twelve sons of Granville William Gresham Leveson-Gower JP DL FSA, by his wife The Hon Sophia Leveson Gower LJStJ (née Leigh). Captain of England Cricket v South Africa in 1909–10, captained England in all three of the Test matches in South Africa. Leveson Gower became an England Test selector in 1909, and was chairman of selectors in 1924 and from 1927 to 1930. H. D. G. Leveson Gower

== Coat of arms ==
When members of the Leveson-Gower family held the dukedom of Sutherland, the arms were: Quarterly, Gules a Cross Flory Sable (Gower), Azure three Laurel Leaves Or (Leveson); Gules three Mullets Or on a Bordure of the second a Double Tressure flory counterflory of the first (Sutherland); Crest: A Wolf passant Argent collared and lined Or; Supporters: a Wolf Argent plain collared and Line reflexed over the back Or.

Since the passing of the dukedom of Sutherland to the Egerton family in 1963, the 6th Duke and his successors have used the Egerton family coat of arms: Argent a Lion rampant Gules between three Pheons Sable.

Coat of arms of Duke of Sutherland
Coronet The coronet of a Duke Crest On a Chapeau Gules turned up Ermine a Lion rampant of the first supporting an Arrow Or feathered and headed Argent Escutcheon Argent a Lion rampant Gules between three Pheons Sable (Egerton family) Supporters Dexter: a Horse Argent ducally gorged Or; Sinister: a Griffin Or ducally gorged Azure Motto Sic Donec (Latin for "Thus until")

== Gower, later Leveson-Gower Baronets, of Stittenham (1620) ==
- Thomas Gower, 1st Baronet (1584–c. 1665) was descended in the direct male line from a number of knights
- Thomas Gower, 2nd Baronet (c. 1605–1672), son of the 1st Baronet
  - Edward Gower, an elder son of the 2nd Baronet, presumably predeceased his father
- Thomas Gower, 3rd Baronet (c. 1666–1689), a son of Edward, died unmarried
- William Leveson-Gower, 4th Baronet (c. 1647–1691), a younger son of the 2nd Baronet
- John Leveson-Gower, 5th Baronet (1675–1709) (created Baron Gower in 1703)

== Barons Gower (1703) ==
- John Leveson-Gower, 1st Baron Gower (1675–1709), eldest son of the 4th Baronet
- John Leveson-Gower, 2nd Baron Gower (1694–1754) (created Earl Gower in 1746)

== Earls Gower (1746) ==
Other titles: Viscount Trentham, of Trentham in the county of Stafford (1746) and Baron Gower (1703)

- John Leveson-Gower, 1st Earl Gower (1694–1754), eldest son of the 1st Baron
- Granville Leveson-Gower, 2nd Earl Gower (1721–1803) (created Marquess of Stafford in 1786)

== Marquesses of Stafford (1786) ==
Other titles: Earl Gower and Viscount Trentham, of Trentham in the county of Stafford (1746) and Baron Gower (1703)

- Granville Leveson-Gower, 1st Marquess of Stafford (1721–1803), third (eldest surviving) son of the 1st Earl
- George Leveson-Gower, 2nd Marquess of Stafford (1758–1833) (created Duke of Sutherland in 1833)

== Dukes of Sutherland (1833) ==
Other titles (1st Duke onwards): Marquess of Stafford (1786), Earl Gower and Viscount Trentham, of Trentham in the county of Stafford (1746) and Baron Gower (1703)

- George Granville Leveson-Gower, 1st Duke of Sutherland (1758–1833), eldest son of the 1st Marquess

Other titles (2nd–5th Dukes): Earl of Sutherland and Lord Strathnaver (Sc 1235)

- George Granville Sutherland-Leveson-Gower, 2nd Duke of Sutherland (1786–1861), eldest son of the 1st Duke
- George Granville Sutherland-Leveson-Gower, 3rd Duke of Sutherland (1828–1892), eldest son of the 2nd Duke
  - George Granville Sutherland-Leveson-Gower, Earl Gower (1850–1858), eldest son of the 3rd Duke (then Lord Stafford), died in childhood
- Cromartie Sutherland-Leveson-Gower, 4th Duke of Sutherland (1851–1913), second son of the 3rd Duke
- George Granville Sutherland-Leveson-Gower, 5th Duke of Sutherland (1888–1963), eldest son of the 4th Duke, died without issue

Other titles (6th Duke onwards): Earl of Ellesmere and Viscount Brackley, of Brackley in the county of Northamptonshire (1846)

- John Sutherland Egerton, 6th Duke of Sutherland (1915–2000). Third cousin of the 1st Duke; already 5th Earl of Ellesmere, great-great-grandson of Francis Egerton, 1st Earl of Ellesmere (previously Lord Francis Leveson-Gower), third son of the 1st Duke, died without issue
- Francis Ronald Egerton, 7th Duke of Sutherland (b. 1940), first cousin once removed of the 6th Duke and great-grandson of Francis Charles Granville Egerton, 3rd Earl of Ellesmere
  - Heir apparent: James Granville Egerton, Marquess of Stafford (b. 1975), eldest son of the 7th Duke. He has four daughters.

The second in line is Lord Henry Alexander Egerton (b. 1977), younger son of the 7th Duke, who has three daughters.

== Succession and family tree ==
Line of succession
- George Leveson-Gower, 1st Duke of Sutherland (1758–1833)
  - George Sutherland-Leveson-Gower, 2nd Duke of Sutherland (1786–1861)
    - George Sutherland-Leveson-Gower, 3rd Duke of Sutherland (1828–1892)
      - Cromartie Sutherland-Leveson-Gower, 4th Duke of Sutherland (1851–1913
        - George Sutherland-Leveson-Gower, 5th Duke of Sutherland (1888–1963)
  - Francis Egerton, 1st Earl of Ellesmere (1800–1857)
    - George Egerton, 2nd Earl of Ellesmere (1823–1862)
      - Francis Egerton, 3rd Earl of Ellesmere (1847–1914)
        - John Egerton, 4th Earl of Ellesmere (1872–1944)
          - John Egerton, 6th Duke of Sutherland, 7th Marquess of Stafford, 5th Earl of Ellesmere (1915–2000)
        - Hon. Thomas Henry Frederick Egerton (1876–1953)
          - Reginald Cyril Egerton (1905–1992)
            - Francis Egerton, 7th Duke of Sutherland, 8th Marquess of Stafford, 6th Earl of Ellesmere (born 1940)
              - (1). James Granville Egerton, Marquess of Stafford (born 1975)
              - (2). Lord Henry Alexander Egerton (born 1977)
    - Admiral Hon. Francis Egerton (1824–1895)
      - William Francis Egerton (1868–1949)
        - Francis Egerton (1896–1935)
          - Anthony Francis Egerton (1921–1985)
            - (3). Simon Francis Cavendish Egerton (born 1949)
          - Michael Godolphin Egerton (1924–1979)
            - (4). Nicholas Egerton (born 1967)
          - David William Egerton (1930–2012)
            - (5). Frank Egerton (born 1959)

There are other heirs in remainder to the marquessate of Stafford descended from the younger brothers of the first duke of Sutherland, and further heirs in remainder to the earldom of Gower descended from the younger brothers of the first marquess of Stafford.

Gordon, Leveson-Gower, and Egerton family trees: Earls Gower, Marquesses of Stafford, Earls and Dukes of Sutherland and subsidiary titles

Earl of Sutherland and Lord Strathnaver, 1228 or 1231
William de Moravia a.k.a. Sutherland c. 1210–1248; 1st Earl of Sutherland, etc.
William de Moravia a.k.a. Sutherland c. 1235–1307; 2nd Earl of Sutherland, etc.
William de Moravia a.k.a. Sutherland fl. Early 14th century 3rd Earl of Sutherland, etc.	Kenneth de Moravia a.k.a. Sutherland d. 1333; 4th Earl of Sutherland, etc.
William de Moravia a.k.a. Sutherland d. 1370; 5th Earl of Sutherland, etc.
Robert Sutherland d. 1444; 6th Earl of Sutherland, etc.
John Sutherland d. 1460; 7th Earl of Sutherland, etc.
Alex Sutherland d. 1456; Master of Sutherland	John Sutherland d. 1508; 8th Earl of Sutherland, etc.
John Sutherland d. 1514; 9th Earl of Sutherland, etc.	Elizabeth Sutherland d. 1535; 10th Countess of Sutherland and Lady Strathnaver
Earldom of Sutherland resigned, 1527
Alexander Gordon c. 1505-1530; Earl of Sutherland, etc., 1527
John Gordon; 1525–1567; 11th Earl of Sutherland, etc.
Alexander Gordon d. 1594; 12th Earl of Sutherland, etc.
John Gordon; 1576–1615; 13th Earl of Sutherland, etc.
John Gordon; 1609–1679; 14th Earl of Sutherland, etc.
George Gordon; 1633–1703; 15th Earl of Sutherland, etc.
John Gordon; 1661–1733; 16th Earl of Sutherland, etc.
Baron Gower of Sittenham in the County of York, 1703
William Gordon; 1683–1720 styled Lord Strathnaver	John Leveson-Gower; 1675–1709; 1st Baron Gower, 5th Baronet
Earl Gower and Viscount Trentham of Trentham in the County of Stafford, 1746
William Sutherland; 1708–1750; 17th Earl of Sutherland, etc.	John Leveson-Gower; 1694–1754; 1st Earl Gower, etc., 2nd Baron Gower
Marquess of Stafford, 1786
William Sutherland; 1735–1766; 18th Earl of Sutherland, etc.	Granville Leveson-Gower; 1721–1803; 1st Marquess of Stafford, 2nd Earl Gower, etc., 3rd Baron Gower
Duke of Sutherland, 1833	Viscount Granville, of Stone Park in the County of Stafford, 1815; Earl Granville (2nd creation) and Baron Leveson of Stone Park in the County of Stafford, 1833
Lady Elizabeth Sutherland; 1765–1839; 19th Countess of Sutherland, etc. suo jure	George Granville Leveson-Gower; 1758–1833; 1st Duke of Sutherland, 2nd Marquess of Stafford, 3rd Earl Gower, etc., 4th Baron Gower	Granville Leveson-Gower; 1773–1846; 1st Earl Granville, etc.
Earl of Ellesmere and Viscount Brackley of Brackley in the County of Northampton, 1846
George Granville Sutherland-Leveson-Gower; 1786–1861; 2nd Duke of Sutherland, 3rd Marquess of Stafford, 20th Earl of Sutherland, etc., 4th Earl Gower, etc., 5th Baron Gower	Francis Egerton; 1800–1857; 1st Earl of Ellesmere, etc.
George Granville Sutherland-Leveson-Gower; 1828–1892; 3rd Duke of Sutherland, 4th Marquess of Stafford, 21st Earl of Sutherland, etc., 5th Earl Gower, etc., 6th Baron Gower	George Granville Francis Egerton; 1823–1862; 2nd Earl of Ellesmere, etc.	Granville George Leveson-Gower; 1815–1891; 2nd Earl Granville, etc.
George Granville Sutherland-Leveson-Gower; 1850–1858; Earl Gower	Cromartie Sutherland-Leveson-Gower; 1851–1913; 4th Duke of Sutherland, 5th Marquess of Stafford, 22nd Earl of Sutherland, etc., 6th Earl Gower, etc., 7th Baron Gower	Francis Charles Granville Egerton; 1847–1914; 3rd Earl of Ellesmere, etc.
George Granville Sutherland-Leveson-Gower; 1888–1963; 5th Duke of Sutherland, 6th Marquess of Stafford, 23rd Earl of Sutherland, etc., 7th Earl Gower, etc., 8th Baron Gower	Lord Alastair St Clair; 1890–1921; Sutherland-Leveson-Gower	John Francis Granville Scrope Egerton; 1872–1944; 4th Earl of Ellesmere, etc.	Thomas Henry Frederick Egerton; 1876–1953	Granville George Leveson-Gower; 1872–1939; 3rd Earl Granville, etc.	William Spencer Leveson-Gower; 1880–1953; 4th Earl Granville, etc.
Elizabeth Millicent Sutherland; 1921–2019; 24th Countess of Sutherland, etc. suo jure	John Sutherland Egerton; 1915–2000; 6th Duke of Sutherland, 7th Marquess of Stafford, 5th Earl of Ellesmere, etc., 8th Earl Gower, etc., 9th Baron Gower	Reginald Cyril Egerton; 1905–1992	Granville James Leveson-Gower; 1918–1996; 5th Earl Granville, etc.
Alastair Charles St Clair Sutherland b. 1947; 25th Earl of Sutherland, etc.	Francis Ronald Egerton b. 1940; 7th Duke of Sutherland, 8th Marquess of Stafford, 6th Earl of Ellesmere, etc., 9th Earl Gower, etc., 10th Baron Gower	(Granville George) Fergus Leveson-Gower b. 1959; 6th Earl Granville, etc.
Rachel Elizabeth Sutherland b. 1970 styled Mistress of Sutherland	Alexander Charles Robert Sutherland; 1981–2022 styled Lord Strathnaver	James Granville Egerton b. 1975 styled Marquess of Stafford	George James Leveson-Gower b. 1999
Heir presumptive to the Earldom of Sutherland	Heir apparent to the Dukedom of Sutherland and Earldom of Ellesmere	Heir apparent to the Earldom of Granville

== See also ==
- Earl of Sutherland
- Duke of Bridgewater
- Earl Granville
- Earl of Bath (1661 creation)
- Earl of Cromartie
- Earl of Ellesmere
- Highland Clearances
- Sutherland
