= White Lodge, Richmond Park =

Georgian house in Richmond Park, London, England

White Lodge
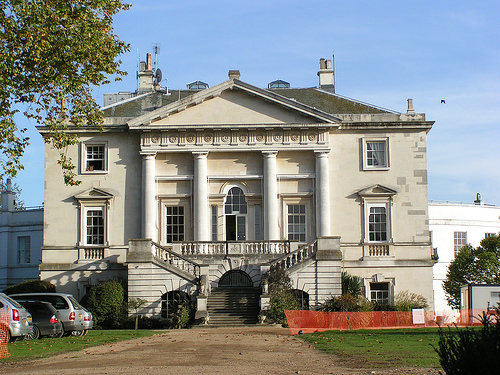
- White Lodge, Richmond Park

- Location in Greater London
- 51°26′43″N 0°15′53″W
- Location: Richmond Park, London Borough of Richmond upon Thames

History
- Built: 1727–30

Site notes
- Architect: Roger Morris
- Architectural style: English Palladian

Listed Building – Grade I
- Official name: White Lodge
- Designated: 10 March 1981
- Reference no.: 1250045

White Lodge is a Grade I listed Georgian house situated in Richmond Park, in the London Borough of Richmond upon Thames. Formerly a royal residence, it now houses the Royal Ballet Lower School, instructing students aged 11–16.

== Early history ==
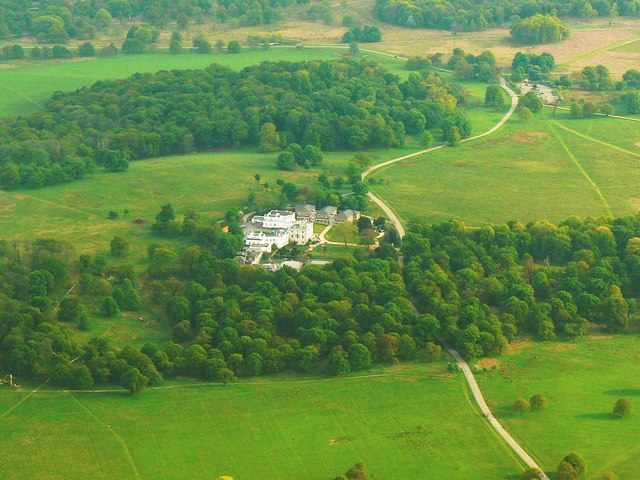
White Lodge from the air in 2009

The house was built as a hunting lodge for George II, by the architect Roger Morris, and construction began shortly after his accession to the throne in 1727. Completed in 1730 and originally called Stone Lodge, the house was renamed New Lodge shortly afterwards to distinguish it from nearby Old Lodge, which was demolished in 1841. Old Lodge itself had been built by George II for Britain's first prime minister, Sir Robert Walpole, who frequented it, particularly to hunt at the estate. Walpole said that he could "do more business there (Old Lodge) than he could in town".

Caroline of Ansbach, wife of George II, stayed at the new lodge frequently and, on her death in 1737, White Lodge passed to her friend Sir Robert Walpole, the prime minister. After his death, it passed to Queen Caroline's daughter, Princess Amelia, in 1751. Amelia also became the ranger of Richmond Park and closed the entire park to the public, except to distinguished friends and those with permits, sparking public outrage. In 1758, a court case made by a local brewer against a park gatekeeper eventually overturned Princess Amelia's order, and the park was once again opened to the public. Amelia is remembered for adding the two white wings to the main lodge, which remain to this day. They were designed by Stephen Wright.

The prime minister, John Stuart, 3rd Earl of Bute, became ranger of Richmond Park after Princess Amelia's resignation in 1760. The British Magazine for January 1761 lists Lord Bute as the Ranger with his Deputy Ranger being Sir Sidney Meadows. Although White Lodge remained Lord Bute's official address, he was also entitled to the use of White Lodge's neighbour, Old Lodge, which would house the Meadows family, who were of the Prime Minister's extended family: The Royal Collection holds an etching, dated 1780, by George Barret, Sr. entitled The Lodge in Richmond Park, the residence of Philip Meadows Esq.. Philip Meadows or Medows was the Richmond Park Deputy Ranger and the brother of Sir Sidney Meadows; their father being Sir Philip Meadowes. Deputy Ranger Philip's wife, Lady Frances Meadows, née Pierrepont, was the first cousin of the prime minister's wife, Mary Stuart Wortley.

The name White Lodge first appeared during the Bute-Meadows period, in the journal of Lady Mary Coke. In her entry for Sunday 24 July 1768 she says that she went to Richmond Park hoping to catch a glimpse of King George III and Queen Charlotte, "tho' they are always at the White Lodge on a Sunday".

After restoration of the house following disrepair at the close of the 18th century, George III gave the house to another prime minister, Henry Addington, 1st Viscount Sidmouth, who enclosed the lodge's first private gardens in 1805. The King (affectionately called Farmer George for his enthusiasm for farming and gardening) made himself ranger, and Lord Sidmouth was made deputy ranger. On 10 September 1805, six weeks before the Battle of Trafalgar, Horatio Nelson, 1st Viscount Nelson, visited Lord Sidmouth at White Lodge and is said to have explained his battle plan to him there.

== 19th century ==
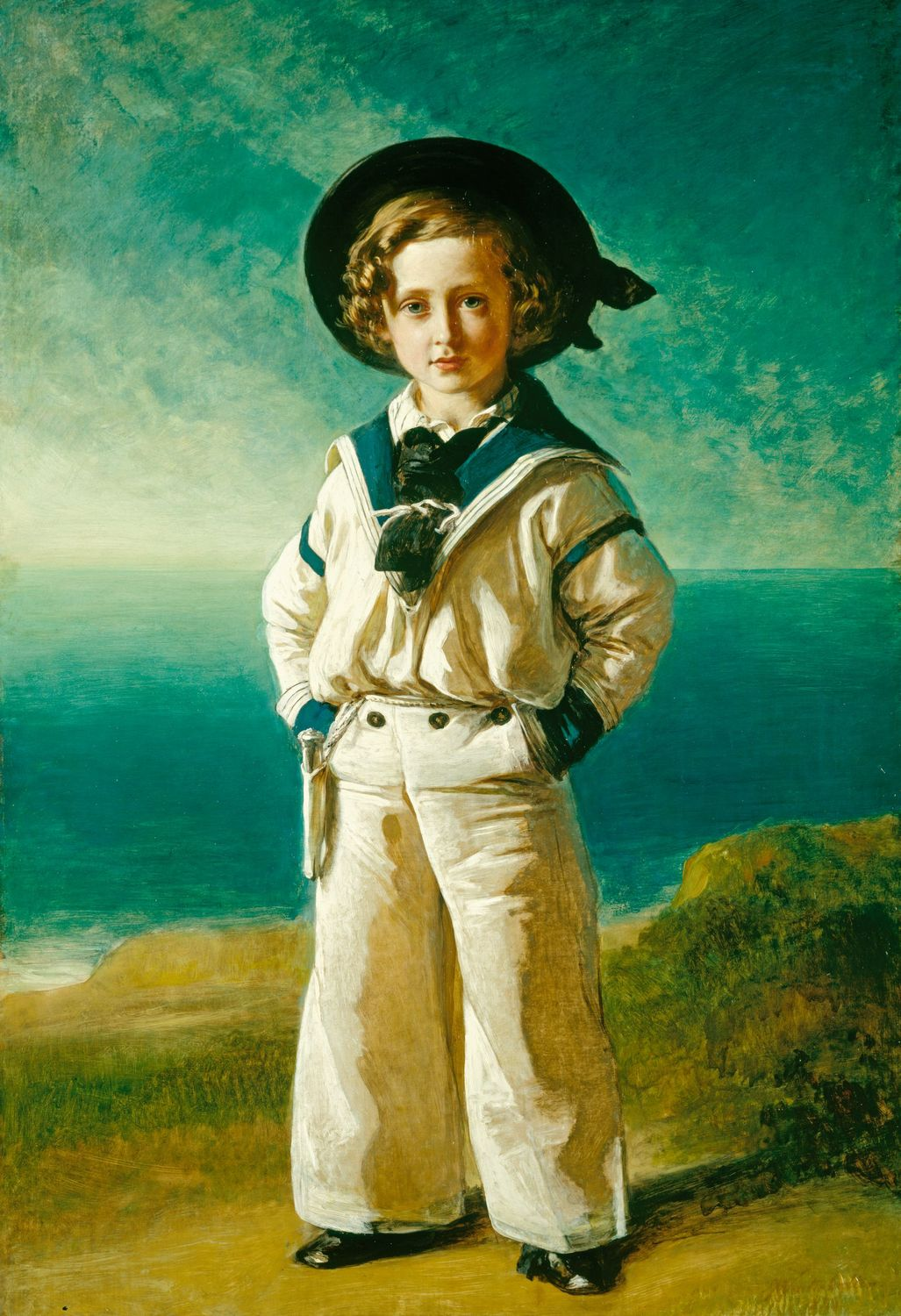
Portrait of Edward, Prince of Wales by Winterhalter, 1846

After Viscount Sidmouth died in 1844, Queen Victoria gave the house to her aunt – the last surviving daughter of George III – Princess Mary, Duchess of Gloucester and Edinburgh. After her death in 1857, Prince Albert decided on White Lodge as a suitable secluded location for his son, the Prince of Wales, the future Edward VII, during his minority and education. Although the Prince of Wales favoured stimulating company to hard study, Prince Albert kept him here in seclusion, with only five companions, two of whom were tutors, the Reverend Charles Feral Tarver, his Latin tutor and chaplain and Frederick Waymouth Gibbs. As a result, the Prince of Wales found the few years at White Lodge boring.

After the Prince of Wales was sent to Ireland to continue his training, Queen Victoria came to White Lodge with Prince Albert in the early months of 1861, after the death of her mother, the Duchess of Kent.

== Teck family and the birth of Edward VIII ==
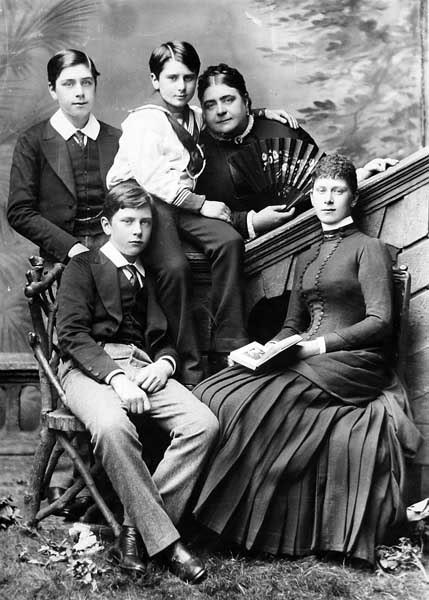
The Duchess of Teck and her family

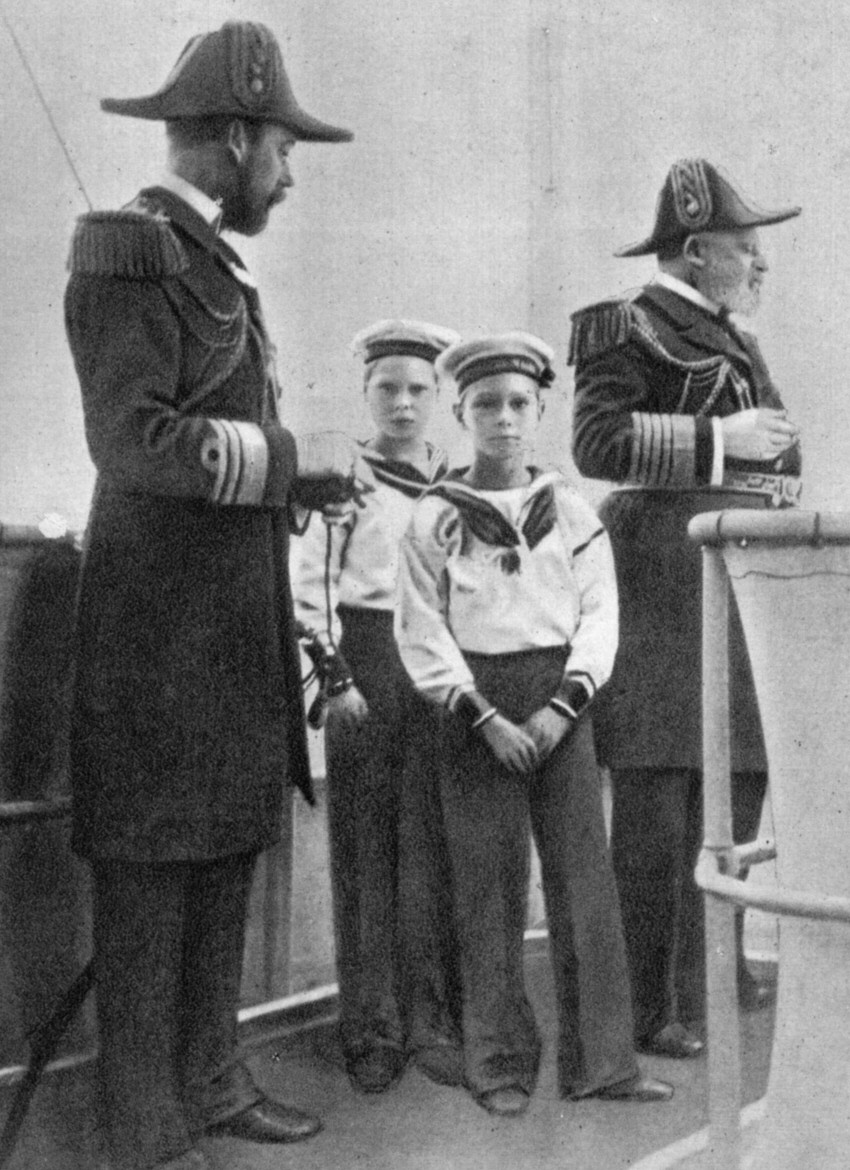
Four kings: Edward VII (far right), his son George, Prince of Wales, later George V (far left), and grandsons Edward, later Edward VIII (rear), and Albert, later George VI (foreground), c. 1908

The next occupants of the Lodge were Prince Francis, Duke of Teck and his wife, Princess Mary Adelaide of Cambridge, who were given use of the house by the mourning Queen Victoria in 1869. Princess Mary Adelaide, a granddaughter of George III and therefore first cousin to the Queen, was famous for her extravagance. Requests for a higher income from the Queen were unsuccessful. Debts increased, and the family fled abroad during the 1880s to escape their creditors.

In 1891, the aged Queen, anxious to find a bride for her grandson, Prince Albert Victor, Duke of Clarence, settled on Princess Mary Adelaide's daughter, Victoria Mary. Following Prince Albert Victor's death a few months before the marriage in 1892, Victoria Mary married his brother, Prince George, Duke of York, the future George V in 1893. In 1894, the Duchess of York gave birth to her first child, the future Edward VIII, at White Lodge. Queen Victoria visited the Lodge to see the Prince shortly afterwards. He was baptised Edward Albert Christian George Andrew Patrick David in the Green Drawing Room of White Lodge on 16 July 1894 by Edward White Benson, Archbishop of Canterbury. Three years later, the Duchess of Teck died at White Lodge, followed by the Duke of Teck in 1900.

== 20th century ==
After Queen Victoria's death in 1901, the Lodge was occupied by Eliza Emma Hartmann, a wealthy widow prominent in London society, who was declared bankrupt in 1909. The house returned to royal use in 1923, during the honeymoon of Prince Albert, Duke of York, the future George VI, and the Duchess of York. Queen Mary, who had lived at White Lodge with her mother, Princess Mary Adelaide, insisted that they make their home at the Lodge. In 1924, Prince Alexander of Yugoslavia, son of the Yorks' friends Prince Paul of Yugoslavia and Princess Olga of Greece and Denmark, was born at the house during the stay of his mother there. The Duke and the Duchess remained in the house until late in 1925 after which the building was leased out by the Crown Estate.

From then on, the house was occupied by various private residents including, from 1927, Arthur Lee, 1st Viscount Lee of Fareham. The last private resident was Colonel James Veitch, who lived at White Lodge until 1954.

== Royal Ballet School ==
In 1955, the Sadler's Wells Ballet School was granted the use of White Lodge on a permanent basis. The school was later granted a Royal Charter and became the Royal Ballet School in 1956. It is now recognised as one of the leading ballet schools in the world.

As part of its redevelopment programme, the Royal Ballet School relocated and enlarged its ballet museum to include a gallery and collections relating to the history of White Lodge. The museum opened to the public in 2009 but closed in 2015.

== See also ==
- Former royal residences
- Richmond Park
- Royal Ballet School
