= Roger Morris (architect) =

English architect (1695–1749)

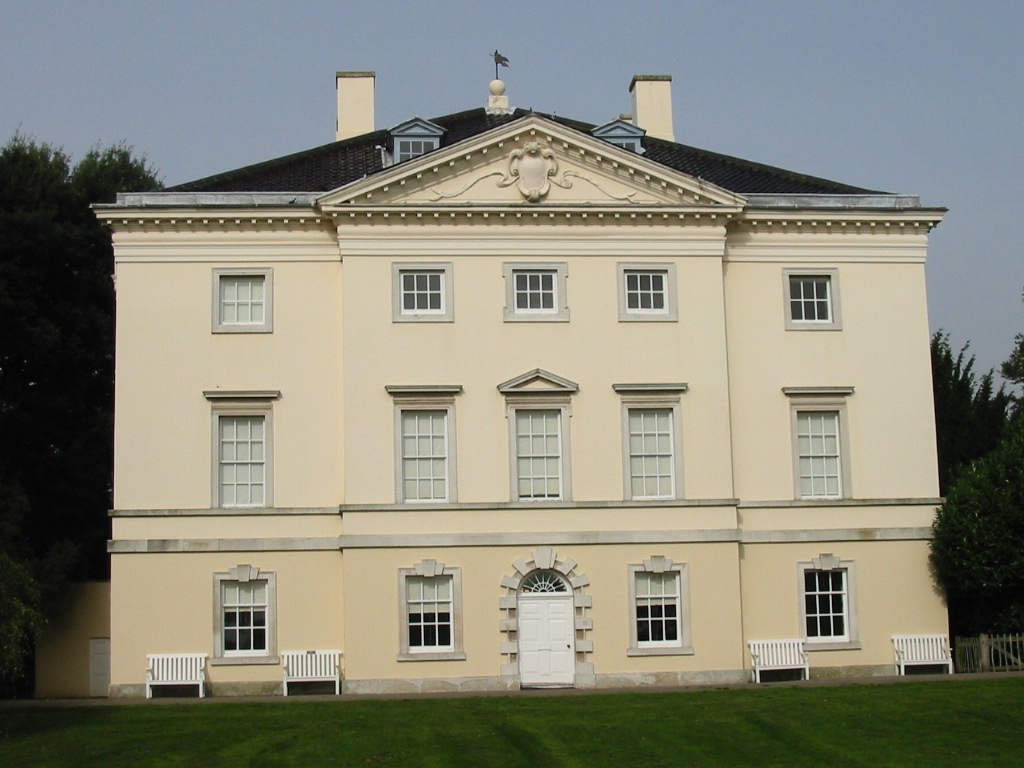
Marble Hill House, with Lord Pembroke, 1724–29: prototype of many English villas and colonial mansions

Roger Morris (19 April 1695 – 31 January 1749) was an English architect whose connection with Colen Campbell brought him to the attention of Henry Herbert, 9th Earl of Pembroke, with whom Morris collaborated on a long series of projects.

== Biography ==
Born in London, Morris received thorough practical training as a bricklayer, as he was described in 1724, when he built a house for himself on the Harley estate in Oxford Street, London. By 1730, in a larger house (which later became known as Hampden House) he built for himself in Green Street, he was described in the rates as a 'gentleman'. On his own account he was successfully involved in speculative building in London, which may have supported his position in life.

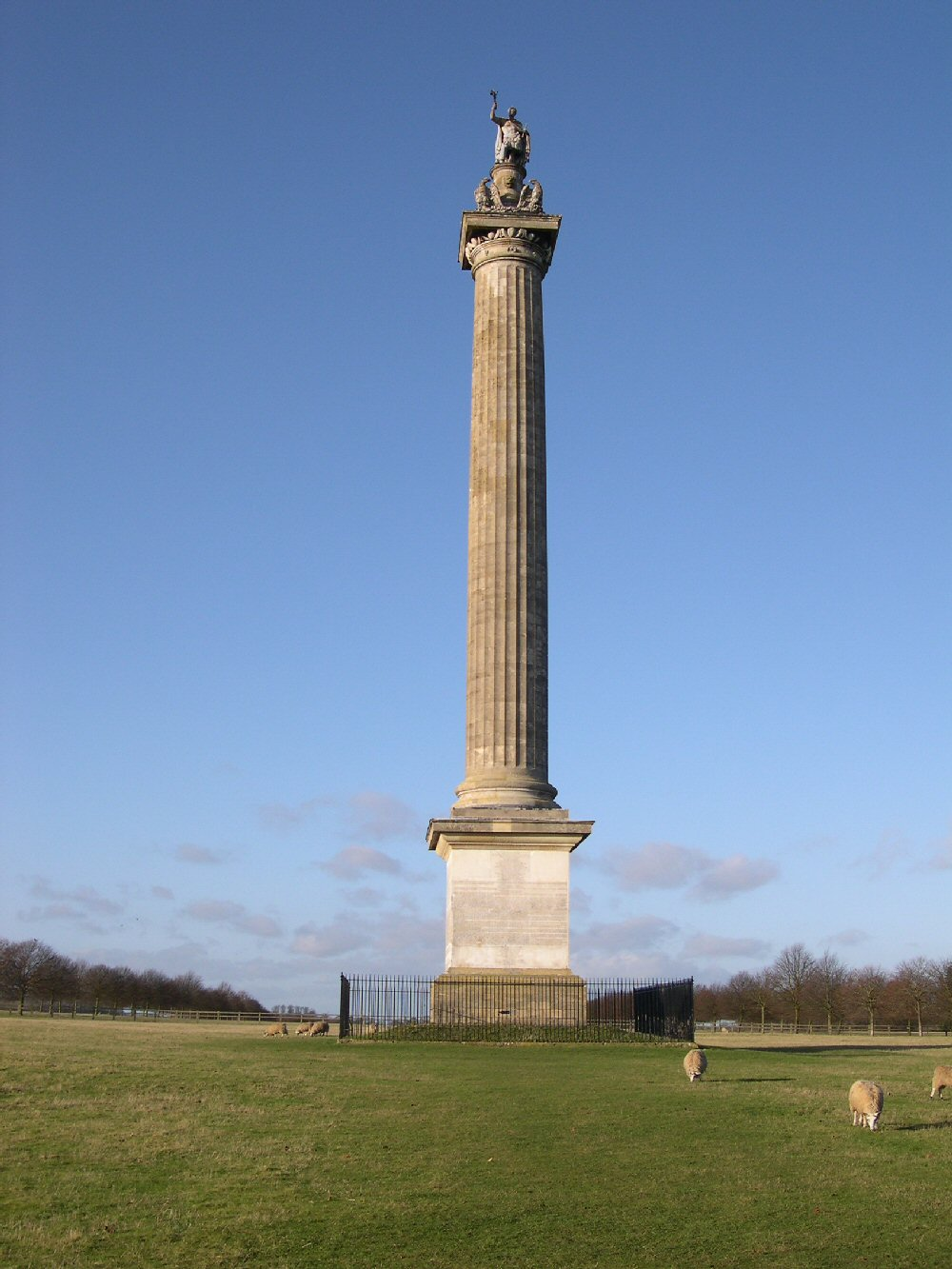
The Blenheim Column of Victory, with Henry Herbert, 1730

Professionally, his career was closely bound at first with Sir Andrew Fountaine, a virtuoso and amateur architect, at Narford, Norfolk; and then to Colen Campbell, to whom he seems to have acted as assistant, as at Studley Royal in Yorkshire; and Lord Pembroke, one of the 'architect earls'. Lord Pembroke's connoisseurship, combined with Morris's practical experience, produced Marble Hill House for Henrietta Howard, Countess of Suffolk, 1724–29; the White Lodge, Richmond Park 1727–28; and, after touring Italy with George Bubb Dodington between June 1731 and September 1732, Morris completed the interiors of Sir John Vanbrugh's incomplete Eastbury House, Dorset, for Dodington, 1733–38 (the house was exploded and razed in 1775); at a later date Morris designed and built a house at Hammersmith, near London, for Bubb Dodington (where a gallery was designed by Giovanni Niccolò Servandoni). He built the Column of Victory at Blenheim Palace for Marlborough's widow, Sarah, Duchess of Marlborough, 1730; Wimbledon House, 1732–33, also for the Duchess; the Palladian Bridge, Wilton House, 1736–37; the neo-Palladian elevation of Apethorpe Palace in Northamptonshire; and probably, Howard Colvin suggests, Westcombe House, Blackheath, near London (c. 1730) which became Pembroke's own. Lord Pembroke presented Morris with a silver cup in 1734 as a token of his regard.

Clearwell Castle in Gloucestershire, of 1727, is attributed to Morris; it is an exceptionally early design in the Gothic Revival castle style. Morris designed Combe Bank, Kent, in the second quarter of the century. John Harris has demonstrated that Morris made a design for the Porter's Lodge at Wilton House, ca. 1733. Remodelling of Lydiard Park, Wiltshire, in the 1740s is attributed to Morris.

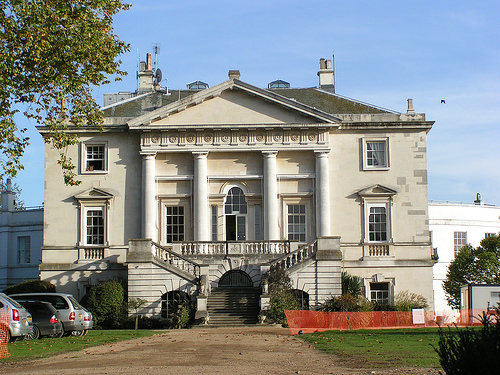
White Lodge, Richmond Park (with Lord Pembroke), 1727–28

Morris's ability and the recommendations of his well-placed patrons secured him a post in the Office of Works, from which all designs for the Crown emanated. The office of Clerk of the Works at Richmond New Park Lodge was created for him in 1727, when he was engaged in building the structure. In 1734 he succeeded in the post of Master Carpenter to the Office of Ordnance, which was worth £2-3,000 a year, for works at the Royal Arsenal, Woolwich and elsewhere. He was also appointed Surveyor to the Mint.

Morris's Palladian villa in town, at 12, Grosvenor Square (1727, for John Aislabie) has been thoroughly analysed by the Survey of London. Morris's independent designs have been praised for their innovatory approach, the architectural historian John Harris writing: "his villas, for example, were, and are, strikingly original in contrast to Campbell's, while Carné's Seat at Goodwood characterises the individual style Morris bestowed upon temple buildings".
