= Eileen Sutherland-Leveson-Gower, Duchess of Sutherland =

British courtier

Her Grace The Duchess of Sutherland
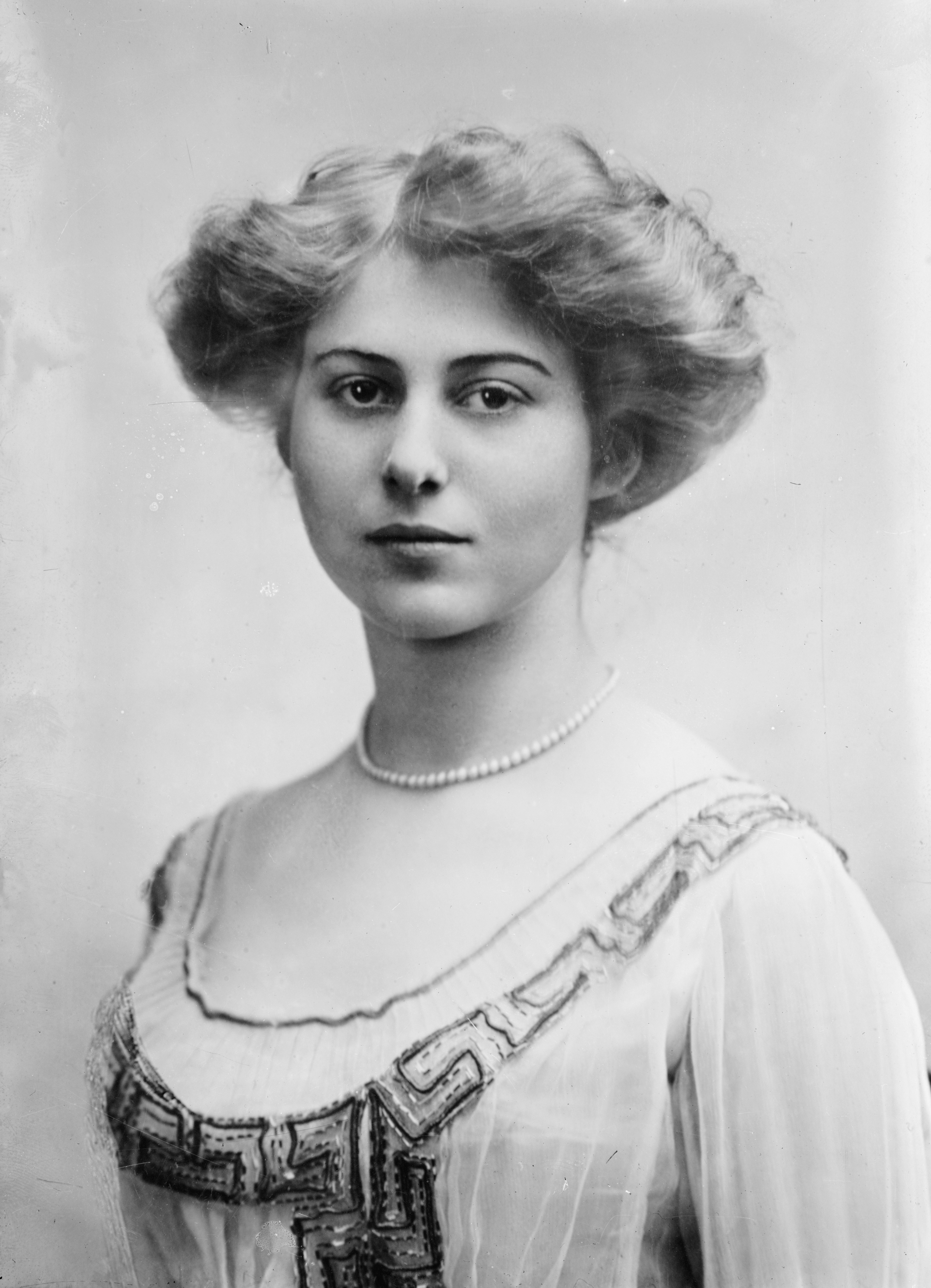
- Born: Lady Eileen Gwladys Butler; 3 November 1891; London
- Died: 24 August 1943 (aged 51)
- Noble family: Butler
- Spouse: George Sutherland-Leveson-Gower, 5th Duke of Sutherland (m. 1912)
- Father: Charles John Brinsley Butler, 7th Earl of Lanesborough
- Mother: Dorothea Gwladys Ellen More Tombs
- Occupation: Mistress of the Robes to Queen Mary

Eileen Sutherland-Leveson-Gower, Duchess of Sutherland (3 November 1891 – 24 August 1943), born Lady Eileen Gwladys Butler and styled Marchioness of Stafford from 1912 to 1913, was a British courtier.

== Biography ==
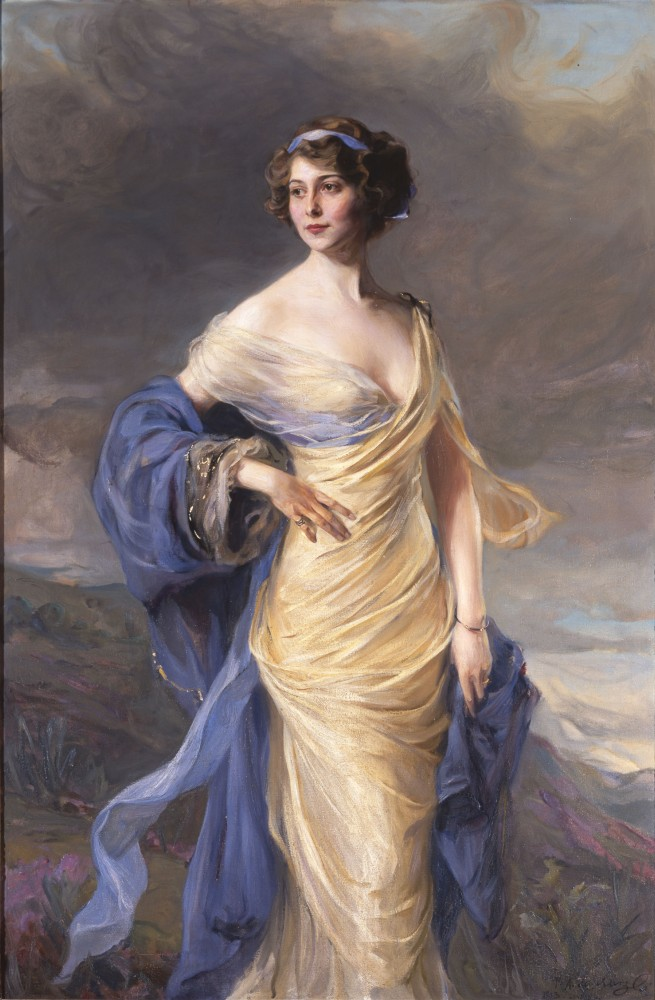
Portrait by Philip de László, 1913

She was born on 3 November 1891 to the 7th Earl of Lanesborough. She was married on 11 April 1912 to George Sutherland-Leveson-Gower, Marquess of Stafford, who succeeded his father as 5th Duke of Sutherland in 1913, whereupon Eileen became Duchess of Sutherland. In World War I, she was a Red Cross nurse. She was Mistress of the Robes to Queen Mary from 1916 to 1921.

She died in 1943, aged 51. She left no children.

Court offices
Preceded by The Duchess of Devonshire	Mistress of the Robes to Queen Mary; 1916–1921	Succeeded by The Duchess of Devonshire
