= Francis Egerton, 7th Duke of Sutherland =

Duke of Sutherland

His Grace The Duke of Sutherland
- Duke of Sutherland; Earl of Ellesmere
- Full name: Francis Ronald Egerton
- Born: 18 February 1940 (age 86); London, Middlesex
- Net worth: £585 million (Sunday Times Rich List 2020)
- Spouse: Victoria Mary Williams (m. 1974)
- Issue: James Egerton, Marquess of Stafford; Lord Henry Egerton
- Parents: Cyril Reginald Egerton; Mary Campbell

Francis Ronald Egerton, 7th Duke of Sutherland (born 18 February 1940), known as Francis Ronald Egerton until 2000, is a British peer from the Egerton family.

== Family ==
Sutherland is the son of Cyril Reginald Egerton, the grandson of Francis Egerton, 3rd Earl of Ellesmere. His mother was Mary, daughter of Sir Ronald Campbell. Sutherland was educated at Eton and Royal Agricultural College.

== Career ==
On 21 July 2000, Sutherland succeeded his first cousin once-removed as 7th Duke of Sutherland and 6th Earl of Ellesmere. Most of Sutherland's wealth is in the form of the art collection put together by the first Duke's uncle, Francis Egerton, 3rd Duke of Bridgewater, which had been inherited by the Ellesmere line of the family. In 2008 he sold Titian's Diana and Actaeon to the National Gallery of Scotland and National Gallery in London for £50 million.

He ranked 107th in the Sunday Times Rich List 2009, with an estimated wealth of £480m in art and land, including Mertoun House and Stetchworth House. In the 2020 edition of the list, his net worth was estimated to be £585 million.

== Marriage and issue ==
In Winterborne Monkton, Dorset, on 11 May 1974, Sutherland married Victoria Mary Williams, daughter of Major-General Alexander Williams and his wife Sybilla Margaret Archdale. They have two sons:

- James Granville Egerton, Marquess of Stafford (born August 12, 1975), the elder son and heir apparent to the peerages, educated at Eton College and the University of Edinburgh. He is married to Barbara Ruth Schneider and they have four daughters.
- Lord Henry Alexander Egerton (born February 28, 1977), who married Harriet Carter, with whom he has three daughters.

== Arms ==
Coat of arms of Francis Egerton, 7th Duke of Sutherland
Coronet The coronet of a Duke Crest On a Chapeau Gules turned up Ermine a Lion rampant of the first supporting an Arrow Or feathered and headed Argent Escutcheon Argent a Lion rampant Gules between three Pheons Sable Supporters Dexter: a Horse Argent ducally gorged Or; Sinister: a Griffin Or ducally gorged Azure Motto Sic Donec (Latin for "Thus until")

Peerage of the United Kingdom
Preceded by John Egerton	Duke of Sutherland; 2000–present	Incumbent
Orders of precedence in the United Kingdom
Preceded by The Duke of Wellington	Gentlemen; The Duke of Sutherland	Succeeded by The Duke of Abercorn
