= Elizabeth Sutherland, 24th Countess of Sutherland =

Scottish noblewoman (1921–2019)

The Right Honourable The Countess of Sutherland
- Countess of Sutherland
- Arms of the Countess of Sutherland
- Tenure: 1 February 1963 – 9 December 2019
- Predecessor: George Sutherland-Leveson-Gower
- Successor: Alistair Sutherland
- Other titles: Lady Strathnaver
- Born: Elizabeth Millicent Sutherland-Leveson-Gower; 30 March 1921; Chelsea, London
- Died: 9 December 2019 (aged 98); London, England
- Residence: Dunrobin Castle
- Spouse: Charles Janson (m. 1946; died 2006)
- Issue: 4
- Parents: Lord Alastair Sutherland-Leveson-Gower; Elizabeth Demarest

Elizabeth Millicent Sutherland, 24th Countess of Sutherland (née Sutherland-Leveson-Gower; 30 March 1921 – 9 December 2019) was a Scottish noblewoman. She was the holder of an earldom in the Peerage of Scotland, and was chief of Clan Sutherland.

== Early life ==
Sutherland was born in Chelsea, London, on 30 March 1921, the only child of Elizabeth Demarest (1892–1931), a daughter of Warren Gardener Demarest of New York City, and Major Lord Alastair Sutherland-Leveson-Gower (1890–1921), a son of Cromartie Sutherland-Leveson-Gower, 4th Duke of Sutherland.

Her father died while taking part in a big game expedition in Rhodesia, contracting malaria and dying there on 28 April 1921, aged 31. In 1931, her mother married Baron George Osten Driesen; she died three months after their wedding. Sutherland became a ward of her uncle George Sutherland-Leveson-Gower, 5th Duke of Sutherland, and when he died without legitimate issue, she succeeded him as the 24th Countess of Sutherland and Lady Strathnaver. The dukedom and the other titles that could only pass in the male line were inherited by the Earl of Ellesmere. She also inherited most of her uncle's large land-holdings, including Dunrobin Castle. She subsequently dropped the double-barrels in her family name, in order to be recognised as chief of Clan Sutherland.

== Marriage ==
On 5 January 1946, Sutherland married journalist Charles Noel Janson (25 December 1917 – 15 June 2006), and together, they had four children:

- Alistair Charles St. Clair Sutherland, 25th Earl of Sutherland (born 7 January 1947); he married Eileen Baker on 29 November 1968, and they were divorced in 1980. They have two daughters. He remarried Gillian Murray on 21 March 1980, and they have two children.
- The Hon. Martin Dearman Sutherland Janson (born 7 January 1947); he married The Hon. Mary Balfour (daughter of Harold Balfour, 1st Baron Balfour of Inchrye) on 14 February 1974. They have five sons.
- Lady Annabel Elizabeth Hélène Janson (born 16 May 1952); she married John Vernon Bainton, son of Richard Bainton, on 29 October 1982.
- The Hon. Matthew Peter Demarest Janson (8 April 1955 – 5 December 1969).

== Later life ==
She died on 9 December 2019 at the London home she shared with her daughter Annabel. She was aged 98. Her funeral took place at Dornoch Cathedral on 21 December.

== Arms ==
Coat of arms of Elizabeth Sutherland, 24th Countess of Sutherland
Coronet A Coronet of an Earl Crest A Cat-a-Mountain sejant rampant proper Escutcheon Gules three Mullets Or (as the ancient arms of Sutherland of that Ilk) on a Bordure of the second a Double Tressure flory counterflory of the first (as an Honourable Augmentation). Supporters On the dexter side a Savage Man wreathed about the head and loins with Laurel proper, holding in his exterior hand a Club Gules resting upon his shoulder, and on the sinister side another like Savage sustaining in his sinister hand and against his shoulder, upon a Staff ensigned by the Coronet of an Earl a Bannerette Gules, charged of three Mullets Or. Motto Sans Peur (Without fear)

Peerage of Scotland
Preceded by George Sutherland-Leveson-Gower	Countess of Sutherland; 1963–2019	Succeeded by Alastair Sutherland
