= John Egerton, 6th Duke of Sutherland =

British peer

His Grace The Duke of Sutherland TD DL
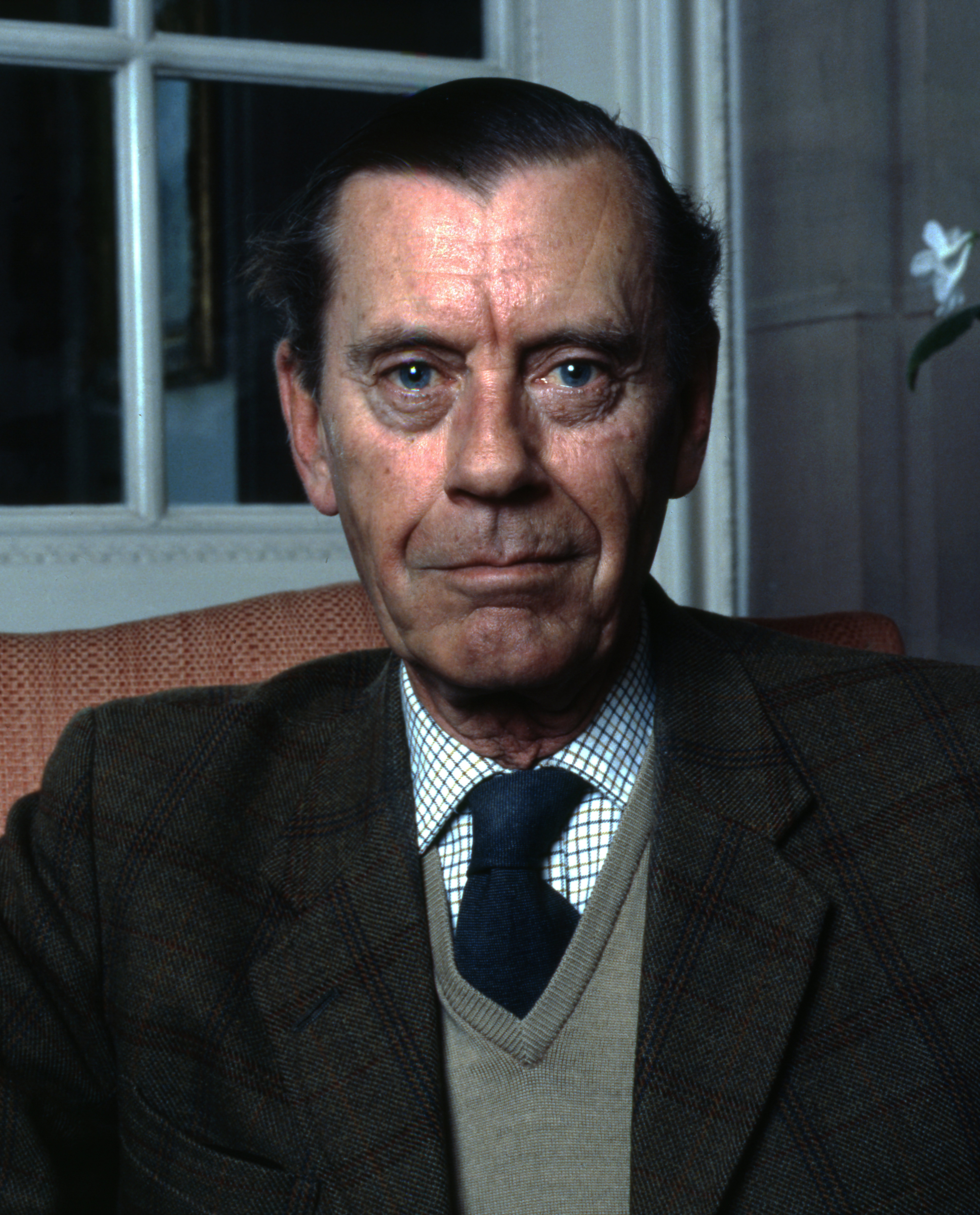
- Portrait by Allan Warren, 1983
- Born: John Sutherland Egerton, Viscount Brackley; 10 May 1915
- Died: 21 September 2000 (aged 85)
- Education: Eton; Trinity College, Cambridge
- Occupations: Peer, politician
- Political party: Conservative
- Spouses: Lady Diana Percy (m. 1939; died 1978) Evelyn Moubray (m. 1979)
- Parent(s): John Egerton, 4th Earl of Ellesmere; Lady Violet Lambton

Arms of the Dukes of Sutherland (Egerton family)

John Sutherland Egerton, 6th Duke of Sutherland, TD, DL (10 May 1915 – 21 September 2000) was a British peer from the Egerton family. He was styled Viscount Brackley until 1944, when he became the 5th Earl of Ellesmere on inheriting his father's substantive title. He inherited his ducal title in 1963 from a distant cousin.

== Background and education ==
The son of John Egerton, 4th Earl of Ellesmere, and Lady Violet Lambton, he was educated at Eton and Trinity College, Cambridge. He travelled to France with the British Expeditionary Force and was captured at Saint-Valery-sur-Somme in 1940. He spent four years in a prisoner of war camp. Upon his return in 1944, he succeeded his father as Earl of Ellesmere.

== Career ==
In 1963, George Sutherland-Leveson-Gower, 5th Duke of Sutherland, his distant cousin "Geordie", died, leaving no immediate male heir. Egerton succeeded to the dukedom, but did not inherit the Sutherland estates or Dunrobin Castle, which went to Elizabeth Janson, Geordie's niece, who became the Countess of Sutherland.

Estate duty forced the Duke to sell many pieces from the family's renowned collection of paintings and drawings. The family's wealth had shifted from landholdings to an estimated £120m collection of paintings which included Raphaels, Titians, Tintorettos, Poussins, and a large part of the famous Orléans collection from the Palais Royal in Paris. The wealth had come from the acquisitions of Francis Egerton, 3rd Duke of Bridgewater, who built the famous canal and passed on his mining riches, and from intermarriage. Benjamin Disraeli once paid tribute to the family's "talent for absorbing heiresses".

Despite the hundreds of paintings the Duke was forced to sell, he retained the Dutch masters for Mertoun House. The Scottish National Gallery in Edinburgh had a number of notable paintings in its possession on long-term loan from the Duke of Sutherland's estate, including pieces by Titian, El Greco, Raphael and van Dyck (one of which, the Venus Anadyomene, was bought by the gallery after his death towards inheritance tax). The Duke made it clear, by selling Bridgewater House in London, that he was abandoning metropolitan pursuits. He maintained the family horse racing tradition.

A Conservative, he took his seat in the House of Lords in 1945, but eschewed his right to vote or speak for more than half a century. He did find his political voice as a Berwickshire county councillor.

The sixth duke kept a very local profile. In 1984 he sold four masterpieces to fund improving his 20-acre (0.081 km^{2}) garden for opening to the public. In 1994 he disagreed when the National Gallery of Scotland sought to rehouse some of his paintings in a new gallery in Glasgow, preferring them to be dispersed around Scotland.

== Family ==
Sutherland married Lady Diana Percy (23 November 1917 – 16 June 1978), daughter of Alan Percy, 8th Duke of Northumberland, on 29 April 1939. Following the death of his first wife, on 16 August 1979 he married Evelyn Moubray, a former interior decorator who shared his love of fishing. There were no children from either marriage.

Peerage of the United Kingdom
Preceded by George Sutherland-Leveson-Gower	Duke of Sutherland; 1963–2000	Succeeded by Francis Egerton
Preceded by John Egerton	Earl of Ellesmere; 1944–2000	Succeeded by Francis Egerton
