= George Sutherland-Leveson-Gower, 5th Duke of Sutherland =

British duke (1888–1963)

His Grace The Duke of Sutherland KT PC
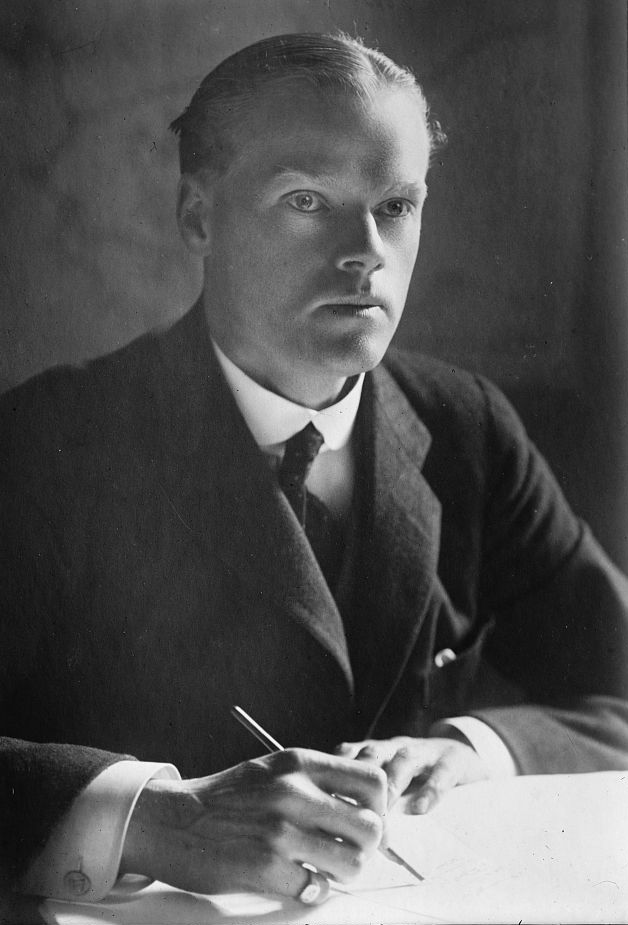

Under-Secretary of State for Air
- In office 31 October 1922 – 22 January 1924
- Monarch: George V
- Prime Minister: Bonar Law; Stanley Baldwin
- Preceded by: The Lord Gorell
- Succeeded by: William Leach

Paymaster General
- In office 28 January 1925 – 2 December 1928
- Monarch: George V
- Prime Minister: Stanley Baldwin
- Preceded by: Vacant
- Succeeded by: The Earl of Onslow

Under-Secretary of State for War
- In office 2 December 1928 – 4 June 1929
- Monarch: George V
- Prime Minister: Stanley Baldwin
- Preceded by: The Earl of Onslow
- Succeeded by: The Earl De La Warr

Member of the House of Lords
- Lord Temporal
- Hereditary peerage 27 June 1913 – 1 February 1963
- Preceded by: The 4th Duke of Sutherland
- Succeeded by: The 6th Duke of Sutherland

Personal details
- Born: 29 August 1888 Cliveden, Buckinghamshire
- Died: 1 February 1963 (aged 74)
- Party: Conservative
- Spouses: Lady Eileen Butler (m. 1912; died 1943) Clare Josephine O'Brian (m. 1944)
- Parent(s): Cromartie Sutherland-Leveson-Gower, 4th Duke of Sutherland; Lady Millicent St Clair-Erskine

George Granville Sutherland-Leveson-Gower, 5th Duke of Sutherland, KT, PC (29 August 1888 – 1 February 1963), styled Earl Gower until 1892 and Marquess of Stafford between 1892 and 1913, was a British courtier, patron of the film industry and Conservative party politician from the Leveson-Gower family. He held minor office in the Conservative administration of Bonar Law and Stanley Baldwin in the 1920s and was later Lord Steward of the Household from 1935 to 1936. As a noted patron of the British film industry, the Sutherland Trophy, awarded by the British Film Institute, is named in his honour.

== Early life ==
Sutherland was born at Cliveden House, Buckinghamshire, in 1888. He was the eldest son of Cromartie Sutherland-Leveson-Gower, 4th Duke of Sutherland, by Lady Millicent St Clair-Erskine, daughter of Robert St Clair-Erskine, 4th Earl of Rosslyn.

He was educated at Summer Fields School, Oxford, and Eton College.

== Career ==
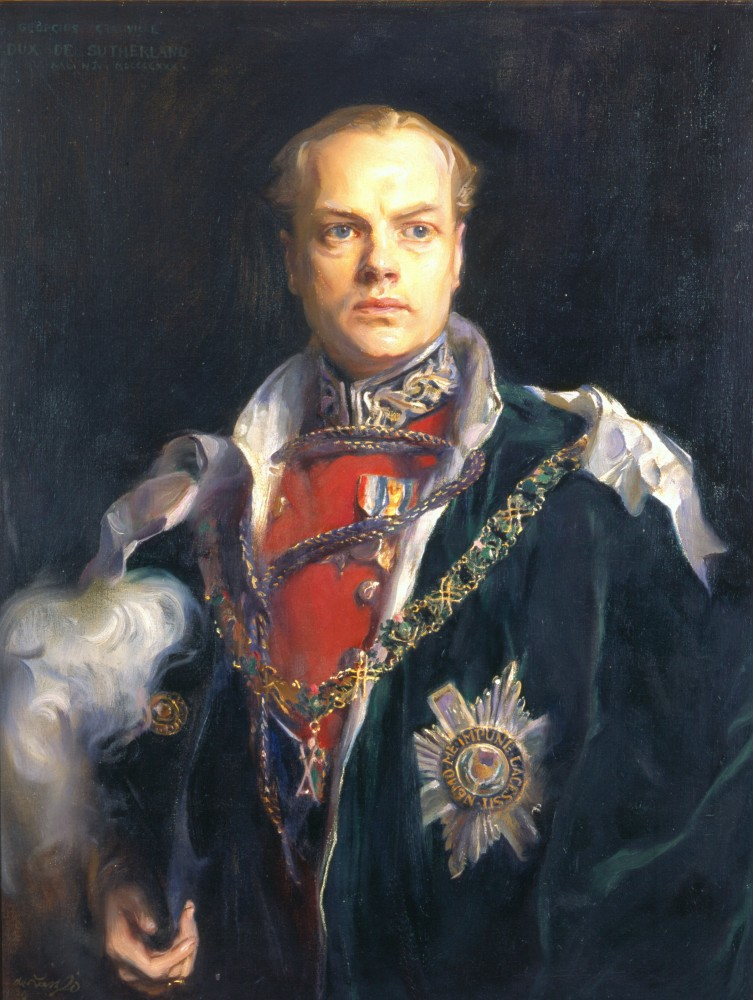
Portrait of The Duke, by Philip de Laszlo, 1930

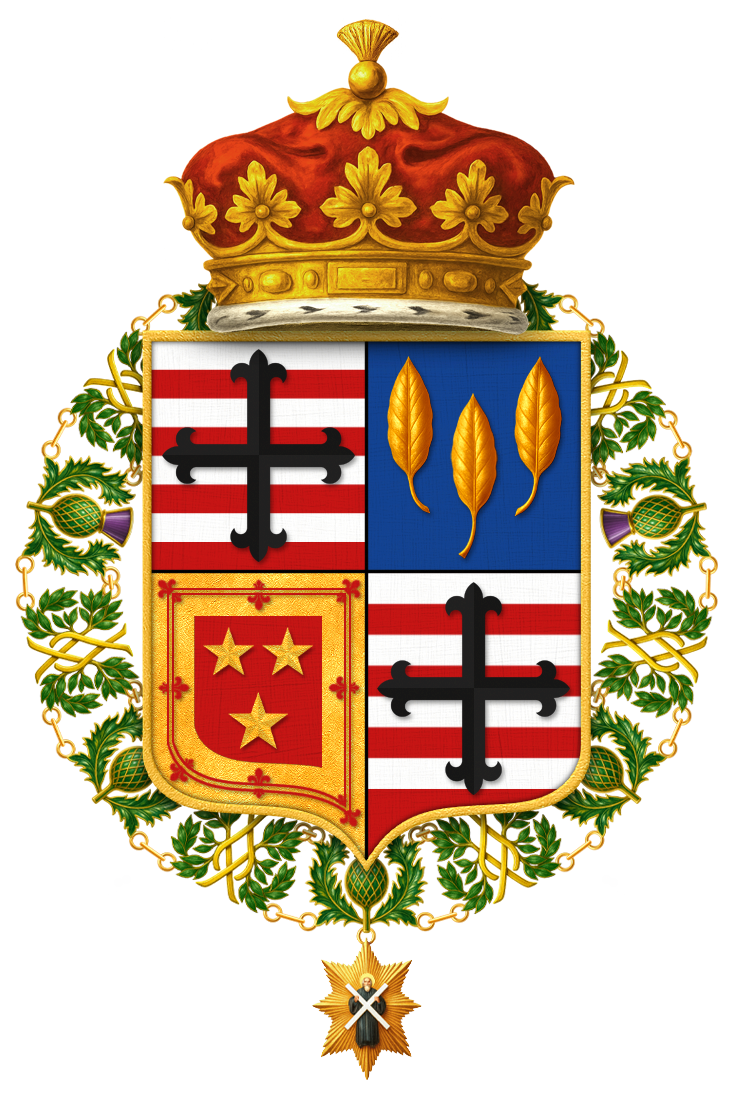
Shield of Arms of George Granville Sutherland-Leveson-Gower, 5th Duke of Sutherland, KT, PC

=== Army and naval service ===
Sutherland initially served in the Lovat Scouts, a part-time yeomanry unit, and held the rank of second lieutenant in 1908. He then served in the regular British Army, transferring to the 2nd Dragoons (Royal Scots Greys) on 10 July 1909. After a year, he moved to part-time service in the Territorial Force, and was appointed a captain in the 5th Battalion of the Seaforth Highlanders on 1 September 1910. From 1914, he was honorary colonel of the same battalion.

He later took a commission in the Royal Naval Reserve, with which he served in the First World War, rising to the rank of commander. In 1914, he commanded HMT Catania and served on the British Military Mission to Belgium from 1914 to 1915. From 1915 to 1917, he commanded the Motor Flotilla sailing between Egypt and the Adriatic Sea. He was awarded the Order of the Crown of Italy.

=== Political career ===
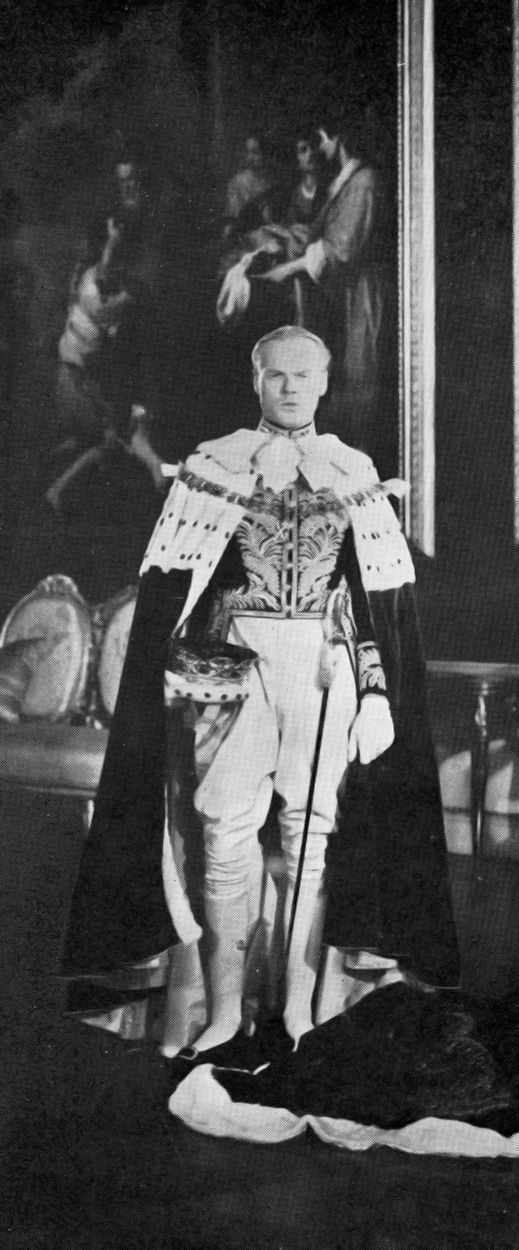
the Duke during the Coronation of George VI. (1937)

Sutherland succeeded his father in the dukedom in 1913 and took his seat in the House of Lords. The same year he was appointed Lord-Lieutenant of Sutherland (succeeding his father), a position he retained until 1944. He was Lord High Commissioner to the General Assembly of the Church of Scotland in 1921 and then served in the Conservative governments of Bonar Law and Stanley Baldwin as Under-Secretary of State for Air from 1922 to 1924, as Paymaster General from 1925 to 1928, and as Under-Secretary of State for War from 1928 to 1929. He was appointed a Knight of the Thistle in 1929. In 1936, he was sworn of the Privy Council and appointed Lord Steward of the Household, a post he held until 1937. In the latter year he bore the orb at the coronation of King George VI.

Sutherland was the first Chairman of the British Film Institute, from 1933 to 1936, and remained its patron until his death. From 1958, the BFI awarded the Sutherland Trophy, named after him, to "the maker of the most original and imaginative film introduced at the National Film Theatre during the year".

== Personal life ==
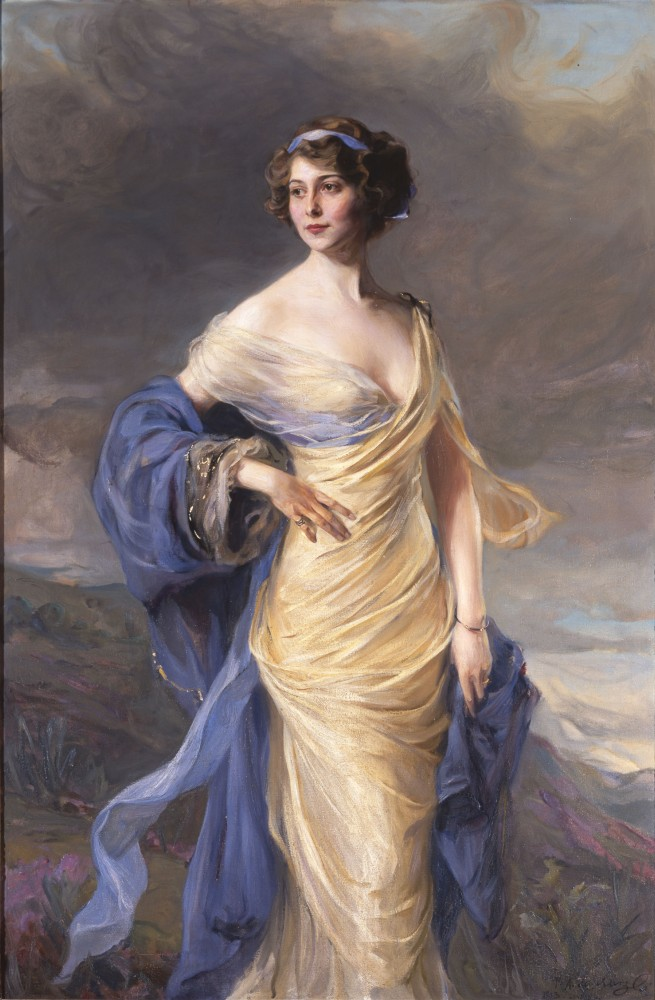
Portrait of his first wife, Lady Eileen by Philip de László, 1913

On 11 April 1912, Sutherland married Lady Eileen Gwladys Butler, daughter of Charles Butler, 7th Earl of Lanesborough. During World War I, she was a Red Cross nurse. She died, without surviving issue, on 24 August 1943.

After her death in 1943, he married Clare Josephine (née O'Brian) Dunkerly (1903–1998), the second daughter of Herbert O'Brian of Calcutta, on 1 July 1944. She was previously married to Alexander Blake Shakespear (who she divorced in March 1944), and Col. Vincent Ashforth Blundell Dunkerly.

Sutherland died in 1963, aged 74 and without issue. His titles were divided according to their patents: the Earldom of Sutherland and Lordship of Strathnaver passed to his niece, Elizabeth Sutherland, 24th Countess of Sutherland, only daughter of Lord Alastair Sutherland-Leveson-Gower, while the remainder of his titles passed to the heir male, a distant relative, the Earl of Ellesmere.

Political offices
Preceded by The Lord Gorell	Under-Secretary of State for Air; 1922–1924	Succeeded by William Leach
Vacant Title last held by Harry Gosling	Paymaster General; 1925–1928	Succeeded by The Earl of Onslow
Preceded by The Earl of Onslow	Under-Secretary of State for War; 1928–1929	Succeeded by The Earl De La Warr
Court offices
Preceded by The Earl of Shaftesbury	Lord Steward; 1936–1937	Succeeded by The Duke of Buccleuch
Honorary titles
Preceded by The Duke of Sutherland	Lord Lieutenant of Sutherland; 1913–1944	Succeeded by G. C. B. Paynter
Peerage of the United Kingdom
Preceded by Cromartie Sutherland-Leveson-Gower	Duke of Sutherland; 1913–1963	Succeeded by John Egerton
Peerage of Scotland
Preceded by Cromartie Sutherland-Leveson-Gower	Earl of Sutherland; 1913–1963	Succeeded by Elizabeth Leveson-Gower
