= Catholic school =

Parochial educational institution operated by a Catholic organization

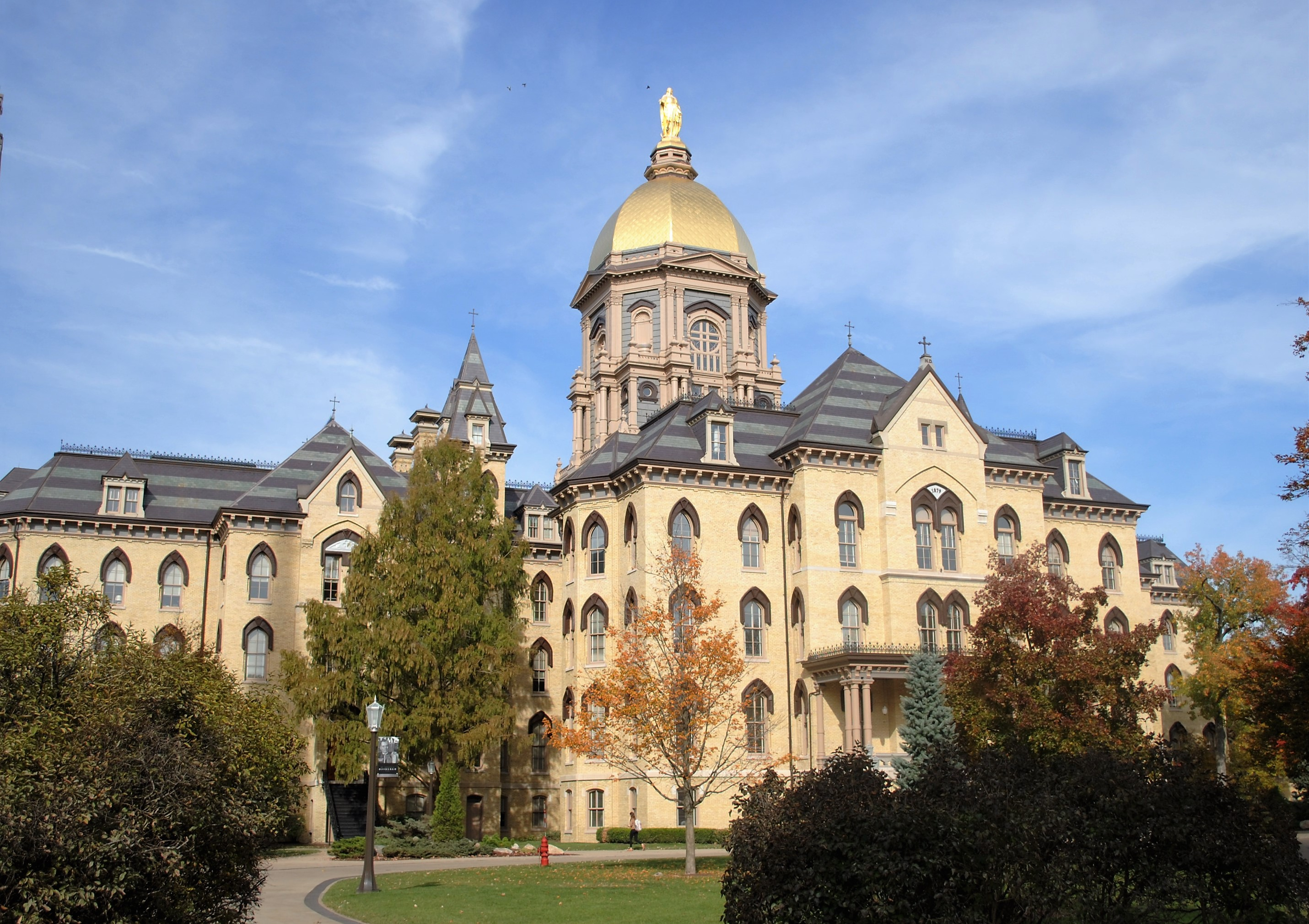
The Main Building of the University of Notre Dame, a Catholic research university in the U.S.

Catholic schools are pre-primary, primary and secondary educational institutions administered in association with the Catholic Church. As of 2011, the Catholic Church operates the world's largest religious, non-governmental school system. In 2016, the church supported 43,800 secondary schools and 95,200 primary schools. The schools include religious education alongside secular subjects in their curriculum. Catholic schools are often linked with Catholic church parishes.

== Background ==
Across Europe, North America, Australia and New Zealand, a major historical driver for the establishment of Catholic schools was Irish immigration. Historically, the establishment of Catholic schools in Europe encountered various struggles following the creation of the Church of England in the Elizabethan Religious settlements of 1558–63. Anti-Catholicism in this period encouraged Catholics to create modern Catholic education systems to preserve their traditions. The Roman Catholic Relief Act 1782 and the Catholic Emancipation Act 1829 later extended the possibility of practicing Catholic Christianity in England more openly and the ability of the Church to create charitable institutions. This led to the development of numerous native religious congregations which established schools, hospitals, orphanages, reformatories, and workhouses.

== Purpose ==
Catholic schools are distinct from their public school counterparts in focusing on the development of individuals as practitioners of the Christian faith. A definitive statement of their purpose was issued by the Second Vatican Council in 1965:

The influence of the Church in the field of education is shown in a special manner by the Catholic school. No less than other schools does the Catholic school pursue cultural goals and the human formation of youth. But its proper function is to create for the school community a special atmosphere animated by the Gospel spirit of freedom and charity, to help youth grow according to the new creatures they were made through baptism as they develop their own personalities, and finally to order the whole of human culture to the news of salvation so that the knowledge the students gradually acquire of the world, life and man is illumined by faith.

The same document notes the "almost entire" reliance of Catholic schools on the teachers in the school.

The Catholic Education Commission of Victoria (Australia) states that the leaders, teachers, and students of a Catholic school must focus on four fundamental rules initiated by the Church and school: the Catholic identity of the school, education in regards to life and faith, the celebration of life and faith, and action and social equality.

Pope Leo XIV observes that "when they are faithful to their name", Catholic schools will be "places of inclusion, integral formation and human development". He adds that "by combining faith and culture, they sow the seeds of the future, honor the image of God and build a better society".

=== Character ===
Like other Christian-affiliated institutions, Catholic schools generally adopt nondenominational admission policies, in that they accept anyone regardless of religion or denominational affiliation, sex, race or ethnicity, or nationality, provided the admission or enrollment requirements and legal documents are submitted, and rules and regulations are obeyed for a fruitful school life. The Second Vatican Council's Declaration considers "very dear" to the Church "those Catholic schools, found especially in the areas of the new churches, which are attended also by students who are not Catholics. However, non-Catholics, whether Christian or not, may need to participate in or be exempted from required activities, particularly those of a religious nature. These are in keeping with the spirit of social inclusiveness.

Many Catholic schools were established by religious orders. The Council observed that in the case of schools led by religious, they are subject to the authority of the local bishop "for purposes of general policy-making and vigilance", but can in other respects be directed as the order itself may determine.

=== Religious education ===
The religious education as a core subject is a vital element of the curriculum where individuals are to develop themselves "intellectually, physically, socially, emotionally and of course, spiritually". The education also involves "the distinct but complementary aspect of the school's religious dimension of liturgical and prayer life of the school community". In Catholic schools in the US, teachers teach a Religious Education Program provided by the Bishop and Superintendent. The teacher, pastor, and Bishop therefore, contribute to the planning and teaching Religious Education Lessons.

The Church is also cognizant of the importance of religious education "for the great number who are being trained in schools that are not Catholic" and recognises the role of Catholic teachers and associates who "work in [non-Catholic] schools" and set an example "by the witness of [their] lives".

Catholic education has been identified as a positive fertility factor: Catholic education at the college level and, to a lesser degree, at secondary school level is associated with a higher number of children, even when accounting for the confounding effect that higher religiosity leads to a higher probability of attending religious education.

=== Oversight and support ===
Catholic schools are subject to the oversight of their diocesan education office, which also seeks to support Catholic schooling and wider education within the diocese. For example, the Diocesan Education Service in the Northampton Diocese (UK) states that it aims "to support Catholic education and formation across the Diocese of Northampton. Our remit is wide including the management of Schools and Academies, Adult Education and Religious Education in Schools."

== Americas ==
=== North America ===
==== Canada ====
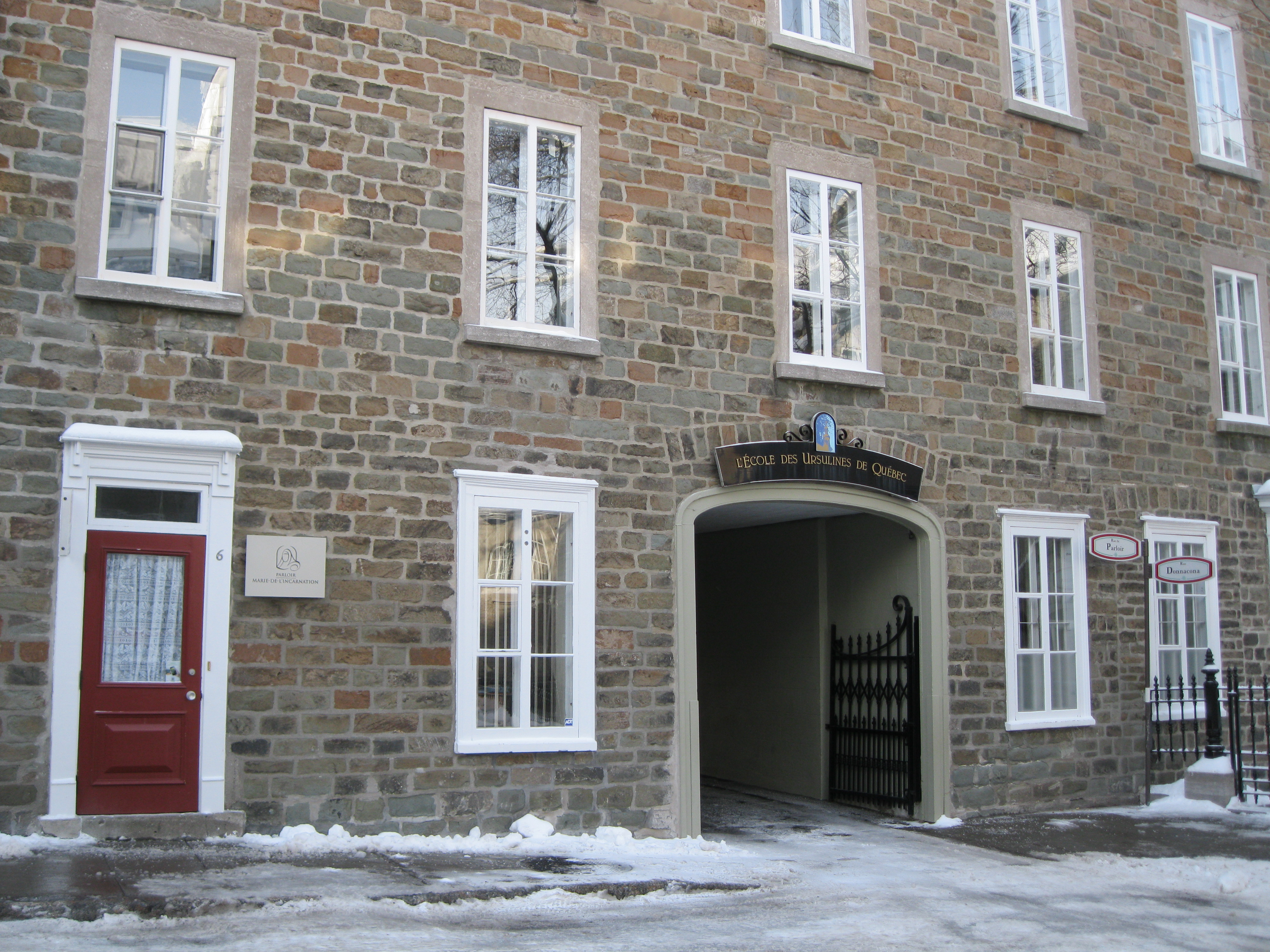
École des Ursulines is a private Catholic school. Founded in 1639, it is one of the oldest active schools in North America

The existence of Catholic schools in Canada can be traced to the year 1620, when the first school was founded by the Catholic Recollet Order in Quebec. Most schools in Canada were operated under the auspices of one Christian body or another until the 19th century. Currently publicly supported Catholic schools operate in three provinces (Alberta, Ontario, and Saskatchewan), as well as all three federal territories (Northwest Territories, Nunavut, and Yukon [to grade 9 only]). Publicly funded Catholic schools operate as separate schools in Canada, meaning they are constitutionally protected. The constitutional protection enjoyed by separate schools in Canadian provinces is enshrined in Section 93 of the Constitution. It gives provinces power over education but with restrictions designed to protect minority religious rights. These restrictions resulted from the significant debate between Protestants and Catholics in Canada over whether schools should be parochial or nondenominational. As opposed to the provinces, the right to separate schools is protected in the three federal territories by the federal Acts of Parliament, which establish those territories.

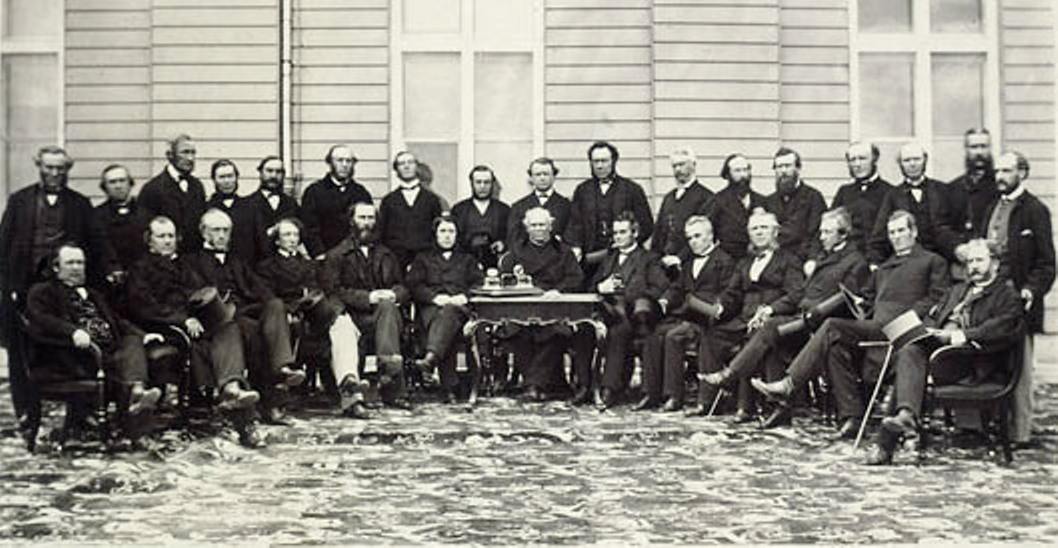
Delegates of the Quebec Conference of 1864. Retention of separate school boards with public funding was a major issue towards Canadian Confederation

Section 93 was the result of constitutional negotiations in the 1860s. Pre-existing rights for tax-funded minority Catholic and Protestant schools had become a significant point for negotiations surrounding Canadian Confederation. Retention of separate school boards with public funding was a significant issue, chiefly due to ethnic and religious tension between Canada's (primarily French-speaking) Catholic population and the (primarily English-speaking) Protestant majority. The issue was a subject of debate at the 1864 Quebec Conference. It was finally resolved at the London Conference of 1866 with a proposal to preserve the separate school systems in Quebec and Ontario. The agreement was written into the Constitution to the effect that the condition of education in each colony (or territory) when it entered Confederation would be constitutionally protected after that.

Despite the compromise, the debate over separate Catholic schools continued to be an issue in the new country. Manitoba's adoption of a single, secular school system in 1890 resulted in a national political crisis. The Manitoba Schools Question was a political crisis in the 1880s and 1890s, revolving around publicly funded separate schools for Catholics and Protestants in Manitoba. The crisis eventually spread to the national level, becoming one of the critical issues in the federal election of 1896. Due to the close link between religion and language during this period in Canada, the Schools Question represented a deeper issue of French survival as a language and culture in Western Canada. The secular system was upheld, with the guarantee of French instruction later revoked in 1916, leaving English as the only official language in use in the province until it was reinstated in 1985.

In the province of Quebec, publicly funded Catholic and Protestant schools were maintained until 1997, when the system was replaced by a linguistic-based secular school system, after passing a constitutional amendment that exempted Quebec from certain conditions of Section 93. Newfoundland and Labrador also operated separate schools for several Christian denominations, including Catholics, prior to 1997. This school system emerged before Newfoundland entered into Confederation in 1949 and continued until 1997 when the province established a secular public system. The absence of Catholic-Protestant tensions in the provinces of British Columbia, New Brunswick, Nova Scotia, and Prince Edward Island resulted in no separate school systems emerging in these provinces.

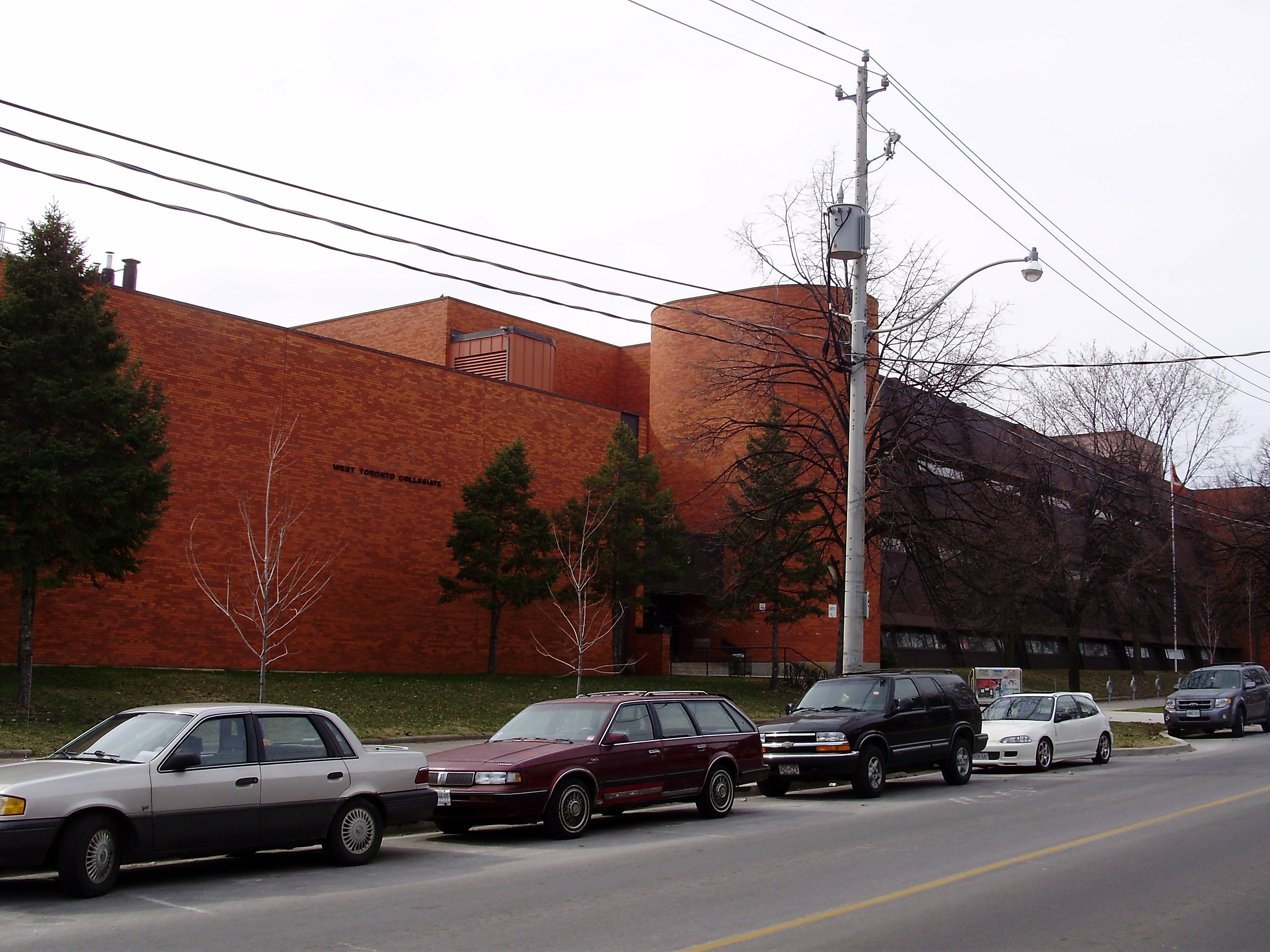
École secondaire catholique Saint-Frère-André in Toronto is one of many publicly funded French Catholic schools in the province of Ontario.

Presently, the Ontario Ministry of Education funds 29 English-language Catholic school boards and 8 French-language Catholic school boards (in addition to 31 English-language secular school boards, 4 French-language secular school boards, and one English-language Protestant school board). Originally, most of the province's secular school boards were Protestant-based. However, it was gradually transformed into a secular public system. Public funding of Catholic schools was initially provided only to Grade 10 in Ontario. However, in 1985, it was extended to cover the final three years of secondary education (Grade 11 to Grade 13/OAC). Publicly funded Catholic separate schools are also present in Alberta and Saskatchewan. However, they are not as prevalent as in the province of Ontario.

The near-exclusive public funding for a single religious denomination in the province of Ontario has garnered controversy in the last few decades. The controversy led to a Supreme Court decision in 1996 that held that the provincial education power under section 93 of the Constitution Act, 1867 is plenary, and is not subject to Charter attack. They also noted it was the product of a historical compromise crucial to Confederation and formed a comprehensive code for denominational school rights that cannot be enlarged through the operation of the Charter of Rights and Freedoms. The issue has garnered criticism internationally. On November 5, 1999, the United Nations Human Rights Committee condemned Canada and Ontario for having violated the equality provisions (Article 26) of the International Covenant on Civil and Political Rights. The Committee restated its concerns on November 2, 2005, when it published its Concluding Observations regarding Canada's fifth periodic report under the Covenant. The Committee observed that Canada had failed to "adopt steps in order to eliminate discrimination on the basis of religion in the funding of schools in Ontario."

It is estimated that 60% of Residential Schools were operated by the Catholic Church.

==== United States ====
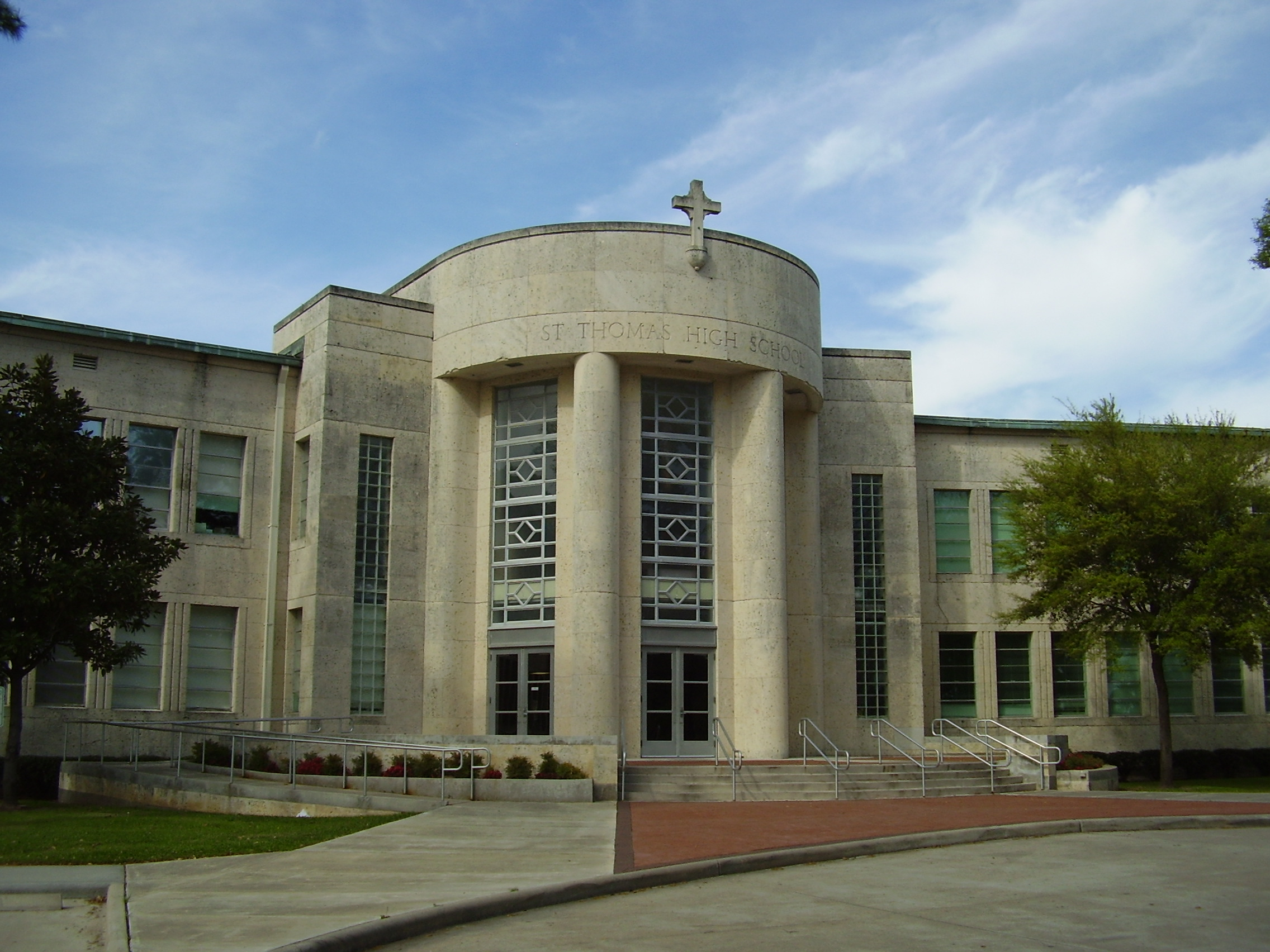
St. Thomas High School in Houston, Texas

Catholic schools form the largest non-public, Christian school system in the United States. In 2010, 2 million students attended 6,980 schools. Three hundred thirty-one of these are private (not affiliated with a particular parish or diocese). They were first established in the United States during the 19th century with the arrival of English immigrants. American Catholic schools wield great significance in the country as they were instrumental in professing Catholicism, which has played a critical role in shaping and developing American culture. Enrollment and development of Americans in Catholic schools increased after World War II, post-war development and Cold War in the battle against anti-religious Communism. By the time of 1964–1965, Catholic schools accounted for nearly 89% of all private school attendance and 12% of all school-age children in school (K-12) in the USA. The number of religious (priests, brothers, and sisters) was at its highest, allowing schools to offer qualified teachers at minimal costs, meaning that most children in the 1940s and 1950s attended their parish school free of charge. Since then, despite American Catholics' widely favorable views of these institutions, there has been a large decline in enrollment predominantly believed to be due to "suburbanization, liberalization of education and the rise of the Catholic middle-class." In the United States, Catholic schools are accredited by independent or state agencies, and teachers are generally certified. Schools are supported through tuition payments, donations, and fundraising charities.

In contrast to its public school counterpart, Catholic urbanization has made more significant achievements in poor areas than wealthier areas. For example, Holy Angels has become one of the strongest academic institutions in the country; it serves the Kenwood, Oakland neighborhoods of South Side Chicago, Illinois, where 3 out of 4 people live in poverty and violent crime is frequent. A recent study of U.S. elementary school students also finds that, regardless of demographic, students who attend Catholic schools exhibit less disruptive behavior and greater self-control than students in other private or public schools, suggesting the benefit that these kinds of environments can have for students of all backgrounds.

The United States Conference of Catholic Bishops listed six key responsibilities of Catholic schools. These are:

1. Encouraging and supporting efforts in Catholic education by fostering the distribution and implementation of both universal Church documents on education as well as related documents developed by the bishops of the United States
2. Supporting educational efforts in the Church in the United States by developing policies, guidelines, and resources for use by bishops in their dioceses
3. Providing consultation on educational issues when requested, including advising and representing the bishops
4. Collaborating with the Committee on Evangelization and Catechesis regarding evangelization and catechesis in Catholic schools and universities
5. Providing support and advocacy in federal public policy on behalf of Catholic educational institutions from pre-school through high school levels
6. Bringing to Catholic education the perspectives and concerns of other cultures and people with special pastoral needs through collaboration with other committees/offices

In 2015, the Inner-city Scholarship Fund run by the Archdiocese of New York announced the largest-ever gift of private money to Catholic schooling. Christine and Stephen Schwarzmann gave $40 million to an endowment that will provide 2,900 children per year with scholarships.

A noticeable decline in enrollment has stemmed from economic downturn from world events such as the COVID-19 pandemic. Between the pandemic's origin in 2020 and 2024, the Catholic School system faced a 6.4% decrease in enrollment as well as the closures or mergers of over 200 schools across the nation. Negative economic fluctuation is noted as a major reason for these declining numbers, as families have struggled to balance finances with uncertainty in employment statuses.

=== South America ===
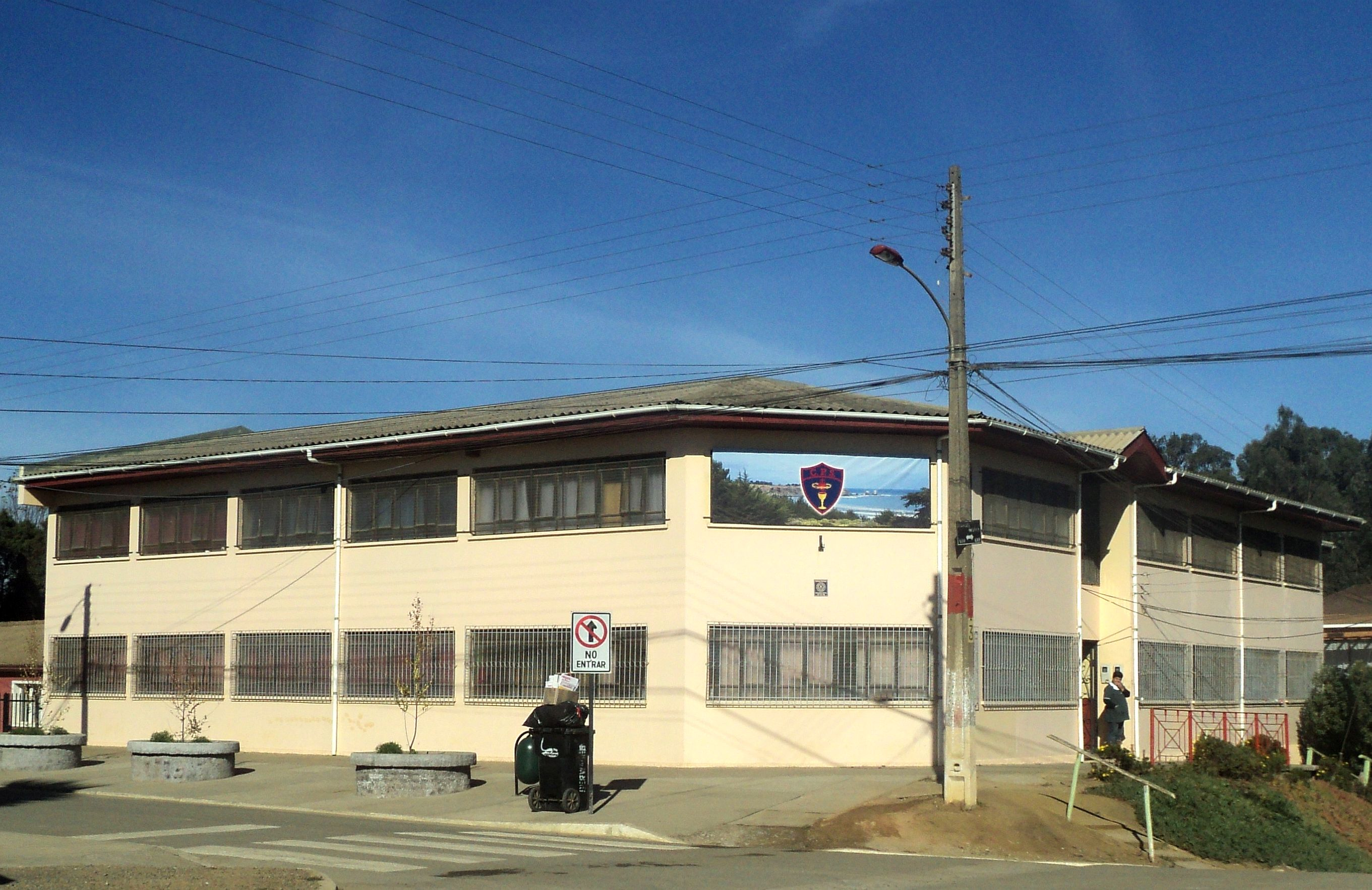
The Colegio de la Preciosa Sangre in Pichilemu, Chile

The vast majority of South Americans are Christians, mostly Catholics. Over 80% in Hispanic countries and some 65%-70% in Brazil consider themselves Catholic. Catholic educational practices were brought to the indigenous population of the Inca by Spaniards, Portuguese and European cultures. Anticlericalism was established in the 19th century resulting in a temporary alienation between church and state.

== Asia ==
=== Malaysia ===
Catholic schools in Malaysia have been important to the country's formal education. The missionaries who opened schools in Malaysia created a solid education framework but Catholic schools have undergone many changes since independence in the late 50s and early 60s. The education policy in Malaysia is very centralized. In 1988, all Catholic religious brothers older than 55 were asked to retire with immediate effect, creating vacancies for lay teachers to take over. Any new brother wanting to join the teaching profession in Malaysia must be in the civil service and share the same status as lay teachers. Many Lasallian traditions such as inter-La Salle games or sports are now integrated into other more extensive government-funded programmes. With Islam being the state religion, compulsory or elective Bible lessons today are limited only to those of the Catholic faith. Today, there are 68 Sisters of the Infant Jesus, 11 parish convents, and 46 La Salle Brothers schools in the country.

=== Pakistan ===
The Catholic Church in Pakistan is active in education, managing leading schools in addition to its spiritual work. The Catholic Church runs 534 schools, 53 hostels, 8 colleges, and 7 technical institutes, according to 2008 statistics.

The Catholic Board of Education is the arm of the Catholic Church in Pakistan, responsible for education. Each diocese has its own board.

The Government of Pakistan nationalised most church schools and colleges in Punjab and Sindh in 1972. Leading schools such as St Patrick's High School, Karachi, St Joseph's Convent School (Karachi) and St Michael's Convent School were never nationalised.

The Government of Sindh oversaw a denationalization program from 1985 to 1995, and the Government of Punjab began a similar program in 1996. In 2001, the Federal Government and the courts ordered the provincial governments to complete the denationalization process.

=== Philippines ===
In the Philippines, private schools have been operated by the Catholic Church since the time of Spanish colonization. The Philippines is currently one of two predominantly Catholic nations in Southeast Asia, the other being Timor-Leste, with a 2004 study by UNESCO indicating that 83% of the population identify themselves as Catholics. The oldest existing university in Asia, University of Santo Tomas, is located in the Philippines. It is the largest single Catholic university in the world. The university was established by the Order of Preachers, also known as the Dominican Order, on April 28, 1611.

== Europe ==
=== Belgium ===
In the past there were conflicts between state schools and Catholic schools (de schoolstrijd), and disputes regarding whether the Catholic schools should be funded by the government. The 1958 School Pact was an agreement by the three large political parties (the Christian Democratic, Socialist and Liberal parties) to end these conflicts.

Due to the federalization of Belgium, education is organized by the three communities since 1989. The educational system of each language community is organized in a different manner. The Dutch-, the French- and the German-speaking part of Belgium can organize its own educational system. This is the immediate reason why Catholic schools are also managed in a different way in each part of the country.

==== Flanders ====
Catholic schools in Flanders are organized by Catholic Education Flanders (Katholiek Onderwijs Vlaanderen), a membership organization of Catholic schools in Flanders and the Brussels region. Catholic Education Flanders is the biggest educational player in Flanders. It oversees education for approximately 935 000 pupils and students through its 2,200 maintained schools. In addition, the organization includes 10 education centers for adults, 11 colleges and a university.

In 2016 the pedagogical project of the ‘dialogue schools’ was introduced. At the crossroads of education, Church and society, this type of Catholic school admits everyone, whatever his or her religious or ideological background may be. The Catholic dialogue school is first and foremost a pedagogical project inspired by the Catholic tradition where dialogue is central. Dialogue with each other, with the context, with tradition, with God, with other worldviews. By engaging in dialogue, the project aims to re-contextualize the Christian tradition in the contemporary context.

=== Ireland ===
Catholic schools in Ireland are state-aided, rather than state owned. Not all costs of operating, building, and maintenance are provided by the central government. Local communities raise funds, as well.

Church groups in Ireland privately own most primary and secondary schools. Evidence indicates that approximately 60% of secondary schools pupils attend schools owned by religious congregations.

=== Slovakia ===
Education gained in these schools is equal to education gained in public schools. The purpose of Catholic schools, besides education and upbringing, is to give alternative content of education and upbringing, new methods and forms.

=== United Kingdom ===
==== England and Wales ====
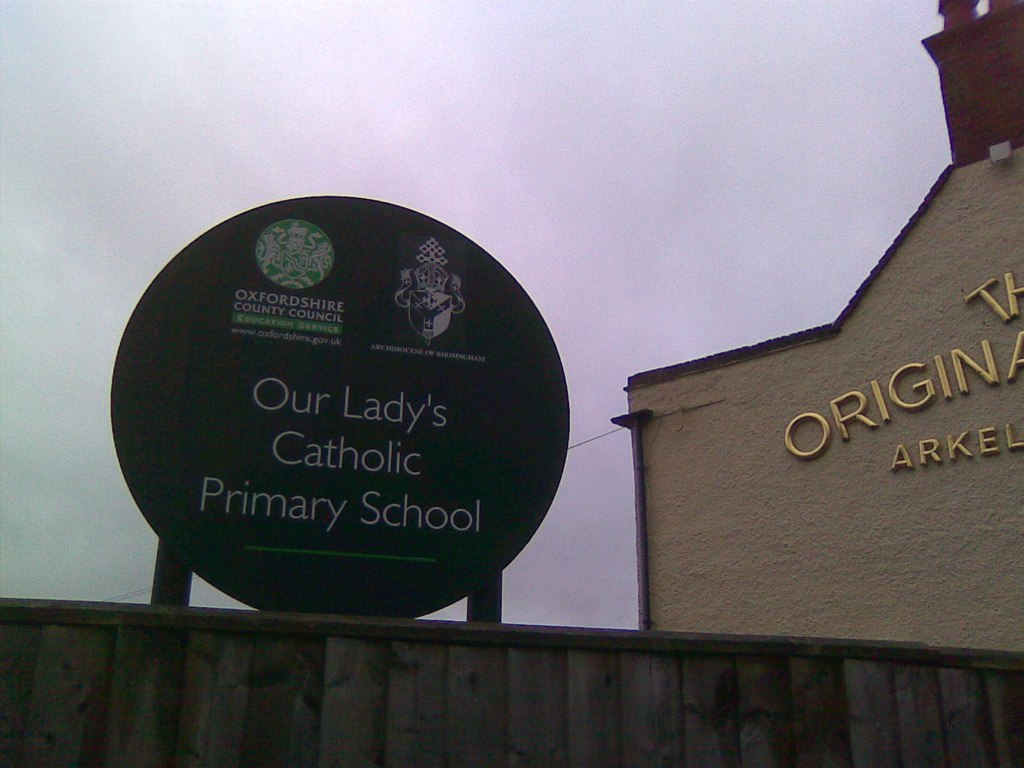
A sign for a Catholic school in Oxford, with the coat-of-arms of the Archdiocese of Birmingham and the logo of the Oxfordshire County Council.

In England and Wales, Catholic schools are either private, and therefore funded privately through students' fees, or maintained by the state. Maintained Catholic schools are either Voluntary Aided, where 10% of the capital funding is provided by the Church, or Academies, which are fully state funded. The Catholic Education Service (CES) oversees education for approximately 840,000 pupils each year through its 2,300 maintained schools. In addition, some 130 independent schools have a Catholic character.

The CES interacts on behalf of all bishops with the government and other national bodies on legal, administrative, and religious education matters to: "promote Catholic interests in education; safeguard Catholic interests in education; and, contribute to Christian perspectives within educational debate at national level." They have refused to open any schools under the Free School programme due to the 50% Rule, which limits the number of places that can be reserved for Catholics.

In 2009, Catholic schools in England comprised two-thirds of all religious secondary schools.

==== Northern Ireland ====
The Council for Catholic Maintained Schools (CCMS) is the advocate for the Catholic Maintained Schools sector in Northern Ireland. CCMS represents trustees, schools, and governors on issues such as raising and maintaining standards, the school's estate, and teacher employment. As the largest employer of teachers in Northern Ireland (8500 teachers), CCMS plays a central role in supporting teachers through its welfare service or in working parties such as the Independent Inquiry into Teacher Pay and Conditions of Service. According to the latest figures from the Department of Education, N.I. Statistics Branch 2006/2007, the number of pupils registered at school in Northern Ireland is 329,583. The number of pupils attending Catholic managed schools is 148,225.

==== Scotland ====
Like in England and Wales, Catholic schools in Scotland are either independent or state-run and overseen by the Scottish Catholic Education Service, established in 1972 as part of the Catholic Education Commission to assist the Bishops' Conference of Scotland in matters of education. The Education Act 1918 guaranteed the rights of Scottish Catholics to educate their children in local Catholic schools and protected the rights of Catholic schools to preserve their religious character. During the 1920s, ownership of most Catholic schools transferred from the Dioceses or the resident order to the state sector. They are known as "denominational schools" and are open to pupils who meet the specified prerequisites regardless of financial situation. A select few, most notably St Aloysius' College and Kilgraston School, remain private.

== Oceania ==
=== Australia ===
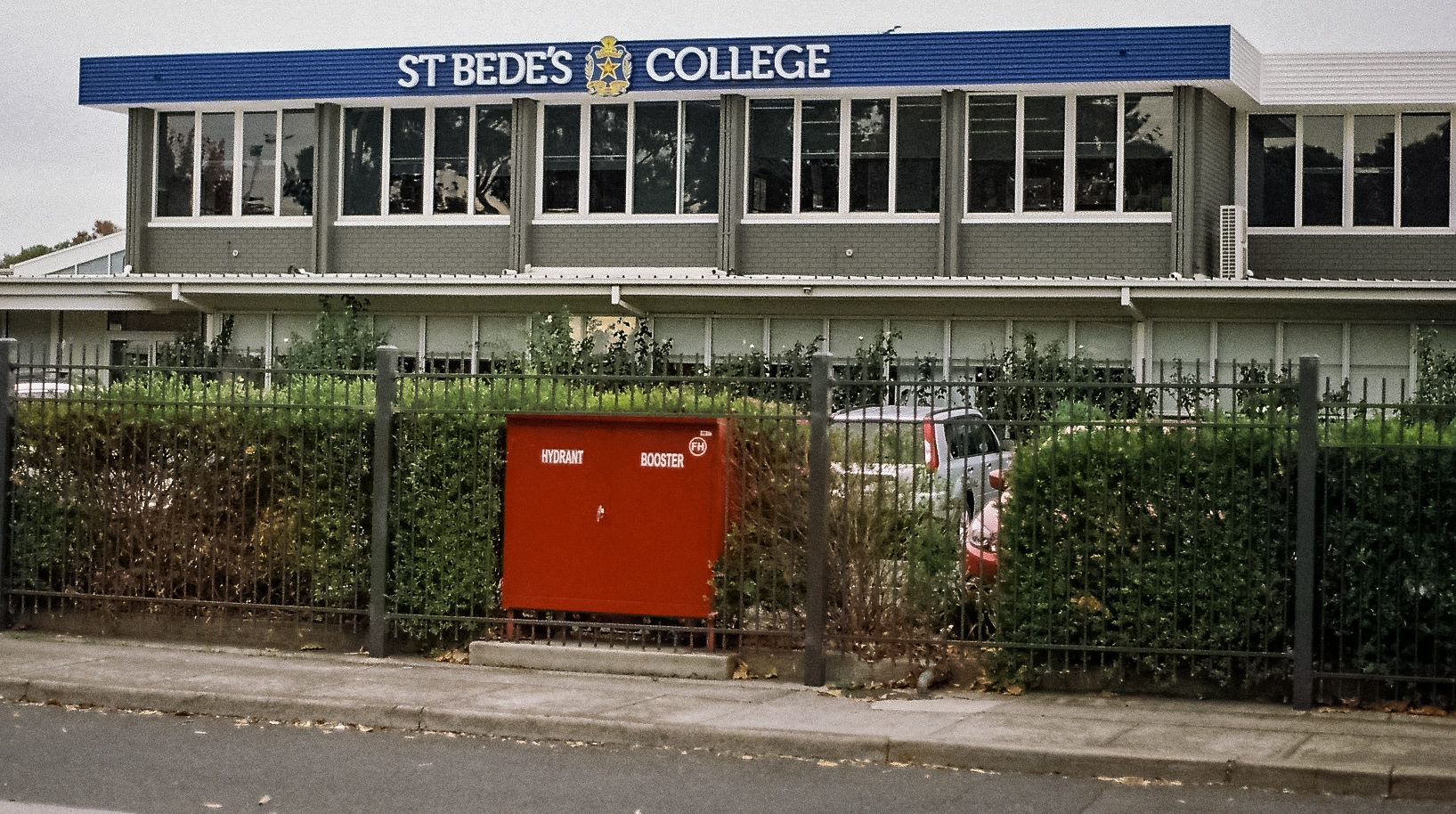
Catholic Secondary College in Victoria Australia.

In Australia, Catholic schools have been operating for over 200 years. The arrival of the first European fleet brought the first Irish Catholics to Australia, predominantly by the transport of convicts. Catholics consisted of one-tenth of the convicts settling in Australia, mostly Irish, while the rest were English and Scottish. By 1803, 2,086 convicts of Irish descent and majority being Catholics had been transported to Botany Bay.

Catholic schools are the largest group of non-government schools in Australia accounting for some 18% of institutions (1,738 of 9,414 as of 2016), compared to 11% for independent schools (1042). Catholic schools are those run by the diocesan Catholic Department of Education; some independent schools are owned and run by Catholic religious orders. In addition, there is at least one school operating within the Society of St Pius X, Catholic traditionalists in irregular canonical status with Rome (Their current canonical status is being resolved in Rome presently): St Thomas Aquinas College in Tynong, Victoria.

As with other non-government schools in Australia, Catholic schools receive funding from the Commonwealth Government. As this does not constitute the establishment of a church, nor the restriction of the free exercise of religion, nor does it create a religious test for public office, it is not considered to breach the separation of Church and State in Australia.

=== New Zealand ===
Catholic education in New Zealand was first introduced following the arrival of the first Catholic Bishop, Jean Baptiste Pompallier, in 1838. A year after signing the Treaty of Waitangi, the first Catholic school in New Zealand was developed in Auckland in 1841.

The schools were originally managed by seven Irish sisters and aimed to assist the Maori population and the new settlers. From 1853 to 1875, the provincial governments financed grants for the Catholic schools. The Education Act 1877, however, allowed all schools to be free, compulsory, and secular, disallowing the public funding of Catholic schools. In the early 1970s, increasing rolls and funding constraints saw Catholic schools accumulating large amounts of debt or being run down. The government, concerned that the state system could not cope with an influx of students if the Catholic schools folded, enacted the Private Schools Conditional Integration Act 1975. The Act allowed Catholic schools and other private schools to 'integrate' with the state system, receiving public funding and keeping their Catholic character, in exchange for being subject to the conditions of being a state school, such as teaching the nationally set curriculum. The first Catholic schools were integrated in August 1979, and by 1984, all Catholic schools in New Zealand had integrated.

As of July 2013, 65,700 students attended Catholic schools in New Zealand, making up 8.6 percent of the total student population. The majority are New Zealand Europeans.

The Catholic schools are owned by a proprietor, typically by the diocese bishop. Currently, Catholic schools in New Zealand are termed 'state-integrated schools' for funding purposes, meaning that teachers' salaries, learning materials, and operations of the school (e.g., power and gas) are publicly funded but the school property is not. New Zealand Catholic schools are built on land owned by the diocese; if the government were to fund Catholic school property maintenance and capital works above the entitlement of any other private property owner, it would be transferring wealth to the bishop, breaking the separation of church and state. Instead, parents of students at Catholic schools pay "attendance dues" to the proprietors to fund property costs: these are typically NZ$390 to $430 per year for primary school students (ages 5–12), and NZ$730 to $860 per year for secondary school students (ages 13–18).

== Funding ==
=== State funding ===
In some countries, Catholic schools are funded by the state. These are institutions that requires assistance from the government. This is the same in public schools where government who mandate schools pay for the needs of schools whether in whole or in part, by taxes of the population. Australian Catholic schools fall under this category, where the Australian government fund Catholic schools as well as state schools. Non-independent Catholic schools in Scotland are another example of where institutions are fully funded by the Scottish Government.

=== Private schools ===
Private schools, also known as independent schools, are not managed by local, state, or national governments. They instead may select their students and are funded in whole or in part by the tuition fees charged to students, rather than relying on the government as public schools do. Students may also get scholarships to enter into a private school depending on the student's talent.

=== Voluntary aided schools ===
Voluntary aided schools are a kind of "maintained school", meaning that they receive the majority of their running costs from the central government via the local authority and do not charge fees to students. In contrast to other types of a maintained school, only 90% of the capital costs of a voluntary aided school are met by the government. The foundation contributes the rest of the capital costs, owns the school's land and buildings, and appoints a majority of the school governors. The governing body runs the school, employs the staff, and decides the school's admission arrangements, subject to rules imposed by the central government. Pupils follow the National Curriculum, except that faith schools may teach Religious Education according to their faith. Within the maintained sector in England, approximately 22% of primary schools and 17% of secondary schools are voluntary aided, including all Catholic schools and the schools of non-Christian faiths.

== International benefits ==
=== Preference for the poor ===
Catholic schools have experienced changes heralded by the Second Vatican Council in regards to Catholic social teaching centered on the poor: "First and foremost, the Church offers its educational services to the poor, or those who are deprived of family help and affection or those who are far from faith...." These changes have led to instances in Brazil, Peru and Chile where the contributions has led to "a new way of being in school" by including the disadvantaged and people in poor areas to education.

=== High attendance and performance ===
Empirical evidence in the United States and Australia indicates that education performance and attendance are greater in Catholic schools in contrast to its public counterparts. Evans and Schwab (1998) in their experiment found that attendance at Catholic schools in the United States increases the probability of completing high school or commencing college by 13%. Similarly, an experiment conducted by Williams and Carpenter (1990) of Australia through comparing the previous examination by private and public schools concluded that students in private education outperform those from government schools on all educational, social and economic indicators.

=== Development of girls in society ===
Catholic schooling has indicated a large impact in the changing role of women for countries such as Malta and Japan. For example, Catholic schooling of girls in Malta indicates: "...evidence of remarkable commitment to the full development of girls in a global society". Similarly, all-girl schools in Japan have also contributed powerfully to the "personal and educational patriarchal society".

== Criticisms ==
=== Economic inequality ===
The expensive cost and necessity to provide high salary levels contribute to the difficulty of maintaining Catholic schools. Many Catholic schools in the United States in inner America which have traditionally served the most are being forced to close at an increasing rate. This apparent abandonment of some poor may contradict the Catholic schools' core principles. There is an apparent contradiction when wealthier Catholic schools receive better resources and are more privileged than those in areas of low-income.

=== Political context ===
There have been instances where some political ideologies that are engaged with secularism or countries that have high nationalism are suspicious of what Catholic schools are teaching. The moral and social teachings by Catholic schools may be seen as "continuation of Colonial cultural dominance of the society" still being felt in Zambia, Malawi, and the [former] colonies of Spain.

=== Outcomes ===
Michael Bayldon argues that "billions of pounds spent on Catholic schooling has not produced a convinced, mature and expanding adult Catholic Church in this country [i.e. the United Kingdom].

== See also ==
- Catholic higher education
- Catholic school uniform
- Christian school
- Parochial school
