= Granville Leveson-Gower =

Granville Leveson-Gower may refer to:

- Granville Leveson-Gower, 1st Marquess of Stafford (1721 – 1803)
- Granville Leveson-Gower, 1st Earl Granville (1773 - 1846)
- Granville Leveson-Gower, 2nd Earl Granville (1815 – 1891)
- Granville Leveson-Gower, 3rd Earl Granville (1872 – 1939)
