= Granville Leveson-Gower, 5th Earl Granville =

British soldier, banker, peer, and landowner

- Born: 6 December 1918
- Died: 31 October 1996 (aged 77)
- Spouse: Doon Plunket (m. 1958)
- Children: 3, including Fergus
- Parents: William Leveson-Gower (father); Rose Bowes-Lyon (mother)
- Relatives: Rosie Stancer (niece); Claude Bowes-Lyon (grandfather); Granville Leveson-Gower (grandfather)
- Military career
- Allegiance: United Kingdom
- Branch: British Army
- Rank: Major
- Unit: Coldstream Guards
- Wars: World War II
- Awards: Military Cross

Granville James Leveson-Gower, 5th Earl Granville MC (6 December 1918 – 31 October 1996) was a British soldier, banker, peer, and landowner, a member of the House of Lords from 1953 until his death.

He was laird of North Uist from 1960 and Lord Lieutenant of the Western Isles from 1983 to 1993.

== Early life ==
The son of Vice-Admiral William Leveson-Gower, 4th Earl Granville, and his wife Lady Rose Bowes-Lyon, a daughter of Claude Bowes-Lyon, 14th Earl of Strathmore and Kinghorne, he was educated at Eton College. Known formally as Lord Leveson until 1953, he was commissioned into the Coldstream Guards and saw active service during the Second World War, in which he was twice wounded and mentioned in despatches. Rising to the rank of Major, he was awarded the Military Cross in 1945.

== Later career ==
After the war, Lord Leveson joined Coutts & Co., a private bank.

On 25 June 1953, he succeeded his father as Earl Granville (created 1833), Viscount Granville (1814), and Baron Leveson of Stone (1814), giving him a seat in the House of Lords.

In 1958, Granville married Doon Aileen Plunket, daughter of Brindsley Sheridan Bushe Plunket and granddaughter of William Plunket, 5th Baron Plunket. Her mother was Aileen Sibell Mary Guinness, a granddaughter of Edward Guinness, 1st Earl of Iveagh. They had three children:

- Granville George Fergus Leveson-Gower, later 6th Earl Granville (born 1959)
- Lady Marcia Rose Aileen Leveson-Gower (1961–2005)
- Niall James Leveson-Gower (born 1963)

In 1960, shortly after the birth of his first child, Granville bought the island of North Uist in the Outer Hebrides from the Duke of Hamilton, becoming its laird. Settling there, he built himself a new house, Callernish, near Lochmaddy, designed by the architect Sir Martyn Beckett.

In 1974 Granville was appointed as a Deputy Lieutenant of Inverness-shire and was Vice-Lord-Lieutenant of the Western Isles between January 1976 and 1983, then Lord-Lieutenant from 1983 to December 1993, when he was succeeded by Viscount Dunrossil.

== Notes ==
Peerage of the United Kingdom
Preceded by William Leveson-Gower	Earl Granville; 2nd creation 1953–1996	Succeeded by Granville George Fergus Leveson-Gower
