= Fergus Leveson-Gower, 6th Earl Granville =

British peer, landowner, and artist

The Right Honourable The Earl Granville
- Born: 10 September 1959 (age 67)
- Education: University of Aberdeen
- Spouse(s): Anne Topping (m. 1997) Florence Pearson
- Children: 5
- Father: Granville Leveson-Gower
- Relatives: William Leveson-Gower (grandfather); Rose Bowes-Lyon (grandmother)

Granville George Fergus Leveson-Gower, 6th Earl Granville (born 10 September 1959) is a British peer, landowner, and artist. He was known as Lord Leveson until 1996 and was a member of the House of Lords from 1996 to 1999.

== Biography ==
The elder son of Granville Leveson-Gower, 5th Earl Granville, whose mother Rose Leveson-Gower, Countess Granville, was a daughter of the Earl of Strathmore and Kinghorne and a sister of Queen Elizabeth the Queen Mother, he was educated at Eton College and from 1973 to 1976 was Page of Honour to Queen Elizabeth II, who was his godmother. He then joined the University of Aberdeen to take a degree in English literature and History.

In 1960, his father bought the island of North Uist in the Outer Hebrides from the Duke of Hamilton, and he grew up there.

On 31 October 1996, he succeeded as Earl Granville (1833), Viscount Granville (1814), and Baron Leveson of Stone (1814), all in the peerage of the United Kingdom, at the time giving him a seat in the House of Lords. This was lost when the House of Lords Act 1999 came into force.

Granville is the resident laird of North Uist, living on the island at Callernish House, Griminish, near Lochmaddy, a house shaped like a doughnut designed in the 1960s by Sir Martyn Beckett. In 1999, a local smokehouse business came up for sale and Granville took it over, aiming to produce high quality smoked salmon and sea trout. Twenty years later, managing the Hebridean Smokehouse was reported to have been his "day job" during those years. With a passion for beachcombing, Granville has also become an artist and sculptor, inspired by flotsam and jetsam and has exhibited his work in North Uist and Edinburgh.

On 23 May 1997, Granville married Anne Topping, a daughter of Bernard Topping, and they had three children. In 2021, Granville was reported to be living at Callernish with a new wife, Florence Pearson (married in 2016), an artist, their two young sons, a labrador trained to find ambergris, and a parrot.

== Notes ==
Peerage of the United Kingdom
Preceded by Granville James Leveson-Gower	Earl Granville; 2nd creation 1996–	Incumbent
