= Countess Granville =

Countess Granville is a title that has been held by a number of women, either in their own right or as wife of Earl Granville. They include:

== Countess in her own right ==
- Grace Carteret, 1st Countess Granville (c.1667–1744)

== Countesses through marriage ==
- Harriet Leveson-Gower, Countess Granville (1785-1862)
- Rose Leveson-Gower, Countess Granville (1890-1967)
