= Pom Oliver =

British polar explorer and film producer (born 1952)

Pom Oliver (full name Rosamund Cherry Jane Oliver) is a British polar explorer and former film producer, born in May 1952.

When she was 18 years old she began travelling, and eventually hitchhiked from Cape Town to Sydney, where she settled for twelve years. She became a film producer in 1977 and worked on the films Cathy's Child (1979) and Hoodwink (1981), before returning to Britain where she worked on Biggles (1986).

In 1997 she was part of the relay team which reached the North Pole, and in 1999-2000 part of the M&G Polar Team, making her one of the five who became the first British all-women's team to ski to the South Pole.

Following her polar expedition she set up the outdoor education Woodland Skills in Shadow Woods near Billingshurst in West Sussex.

Oliver walked the Monarch's Way in England in 2020. She then travelled across the Aralkum Desert in 2021 and the Sinai Peninsula in 2023 with Rosie Stancer, Arabella Dorman and Lee Watts.
