= Butterstone House School =

Location
- Arthurstone House; Meigle, Perthshire, PH12 8QW; Scotland

Information
- Type: Preparatory school
- Established: 1947
- Founder: The Hon Elizabeth Lyle
- Closed: 2003
- Gender: Girls
- Age: 8 to 13

Butterstone House Preparatory School was the only completely independent boarding preparatory school for girls in Scotland, until its merger with Kilgraston School in 2003.

== History ==
Butterstone House Preparatory School was founded in 1947 by The Hon Elizabeth Lyle, the younger daughter of Sir Archibald Sinclair of Ulbster, MP for Caithness and Sutherland, leader of the Liberal Party, Winston Churchill's wartime Secretary of State for Air and in 1952 created Viscount Thurso. Between 1947 and 1991 the school was located at Butterstone House, near Dunkeld in Perthshire.

Elizabeth Langlands was headmistress between 1973 and 1987. Langlands was succeeded by Christopher Syers-Gibson who remained at the school until his retirement in 1998.

Under the guidance of Christopher Syers-Gibson, the school moved to larger premises at Arthurstone House, Meigle, in 1991. (In 1992 Baroness Linklater of Butterstone, established the New School, Butterstone to cater for children with special needs.)

In June 2003, Butterstone announced that they would be merging with Kilgraston School, Bridge of Earn.

== Notable alumni ==
- Veronica Linklater
- Rosie Stancer
