= Arabella Dorman =

British war artist and portrait painter

Arabella Dorman (born 1975 in London) is a British war artist and portrait painter. She was chosen as one of the BBC's "100 Women" in 2014.

== Life ==
Dorman was born in 1975 in London. She studied at the Byam Shaw School of Art in London (since absorbed into Central Saint Martins) and the University of Edinburgh. She is married to Dominic Elliot.

In 2006 Dorman was Britain's first official war artist to go to the front line in Iraq after being invited by Lt Gen Richard Shirreff, who had purchased one of her works. She started her time in Iraq with the Royal Green Jackets in Basra Palace, where she frequently came under enemy fire, then went to the desert near the Iranian border. She spent time with British forces in Afghanistan in 2009-2014. In 2009 she was embedded with 2nd Battalion, The Rifles in Sangin, Helmand, though she was not allowed to accompany soldiers on patrol, and in 2010 travelled within Afghanistan from her base in Kabul.

Her humanitarian work has taken her to Gaza, Palestine & Israel (2017), Lebanon, Syria (2018) and most recently, Ukraine (2023). Dorman's work explores the realities of modern conflict, its immediate impacts and long-term consequences, and the light that can be born out of the darkness of war.

She worked with refugees in Lesbos, Calais and Dunkirk in 2015 and 2016. In December 2015 she created an art installation by suspending a dinghy, which had been used to transport refugees across the Mediterranean, from the roof of St James's Church, Piccadilly. Called Flight, the exhibit was on display until February 2016, and related the flight of refugees to the ancient tradition of hanging boats from church roofs.

Following on from Dorman's critically acclaimed work Flight, Suspended formed part of her ongoing series of works seeking to highlight the humanitarian crisis of forced displacement across the world today. Suspended premiered in 2017 in St. James's Piccadilly, before touring the UK from 2018-2019, and was notably installed in Canterbury Cathedral and Leicester Cathedrals.

Dorman has exhibited at venues including the Imperial War Museum, the Frost and Reed Gallery, and La Galleria Pall Mall. She works as an Ambassador to the charities Beyond Conflict and Afghanaid and is a member of the Guild of St John of Jerusalem Eye Hospital.

She travelled across the Aralkum Desert in 2021 and the Sinai Peninsula in 2023 with Pom Oliver, Rosie Stancer and Lee Watts.

In 2024 Dorman exhibited Child of War at the Ukrainian Catholic Cathedral, London. This body of work explores the plight of children in war across the world today.

== Publications ==
- Drawing Fire (2014) ISBN 978-0993102301
