= William Leveson-Gower, 4th Earl Granville =

British naval commander and governor

Vice-Admiral The Right Honourable The Earl Granville KG GCVO CB DSO

2nd Governor of Northern Ireland
- In office 7 September 1945 – 1 December 1952
- Monarchs: George VI; Elizabeth II
- Preceded by: The Duke of Abercorn
- Succeeded by: The Lord Wakehurst

Lieutenant Governor of the Isle of Man
- In office 1937–1945
- Monarch: George VI
- Preceded by: Sir Montagu Butler
- Succeeded by: Sir Geoffrey Bromet

Personal details
- Born: William Spencer Leveson-Gower; 11 July 1880
- Died: 25 June 1953 (aged 72)
- Spouse: Lady Rose Constance Bowes-Lyon (m. 1916)
- Children: 2
- Parent(s): Granville Leveson-Gower, 2nd Earl Granville; Castila Rosalind Campbell
- Relatives: Rosie Stancer (granddaughter)

Military service
- Allegiance: United Kingdom
- Branch/service: Royal Navy
- Years of service: 1894–1935
- Rank: Vice Admiral
- Commands: Coast of Scotland
- Battles/wars: World War I

William Spencer Leveson-Gower, 4th Earl Granville (11 July 1880 – 25 June 1953), styled The Honourable William Leveson-Gower until 1939, was a British naval commander and governor from the Leveson-Gower family.

== Background ==
Leveson-Gower was the younger son of Granville Leveson-Gower, 2nd Earl Granville, by his second wife Castilia Rosalind Campbell (daughter of Walter Frederick Campbell).

== Career ==
After Wixenford School, William Leveson-Gower joined the Royal Navy in 1894. He was promoted to Sub Lieutenant in 1900, and lieutenant on 26 June 1902, when he was re-appointed to the torpedo cruiser HMS Scout. In August 1902 he was posted to HMS Hood, serving with the Mediterranean Fleet.

Promotion to commander followed in 1913. Leveson-Gower served in the First World War and was awarded the Distinguished Service Order in 1919.

Leveson-Gower was appointed Chief of Staff to the Commander-in-Chief, The Nore in 1924, aide-de-camp to the King in 1929 and Commander-in-Chief, Coast of Scotland in 1931. He was made a Companion of the Bath in 1930 and retired in 1935.

Leveson-Gower became Lieutenant Governor of the Isle of Man in 1937. He set up the War Consultative Committee in November 1939 to act as a 'war cabinet' during World War II. The committee consisted of members of the House of Keys and the Legislative Council of the Isle of Man.

In 1939 Leveson-Gower succeeded his elder brother in the earldom. Granville was appointed a Knight Commander of the Royal Victorian Order (KCVO) in 1945 and became Governor of Northern Ireland in 1945, serving until 1952. He was made a Knight Companion of the Garter that same year.

== Family ==
In 1916, Lord Granville married Lady Rose Bowes-Lyon, the second surviving daughter of the 14th Earl of Strathmore and Kinghorne, and elder sister of Queen Elizabeth the Queen Mother. They had two children (Lady Mary Cecilia Leveson-Gower (1917–2014) and Granville James Leveson-Gower, 5th Earl Granville (1918–1996)), five grandchildren and eleven great-grandchildren. Lord Granville died in June 1953, aged 72. He was cremated at Golders Green Crematorium.

Flag of the governor of Northern Ireland

Military offices
| Preceded by Theodore Hallett | Commander-in-Chief, Coast of Scotland; 1931–1933 | Succeeded by Everard Hardman-Jones |
Government offices
| Preceded by Sir Montagu Butler | Lieutenant Governor of the Isle of Man; 1937–1945 | Succeeded by Sir Geoffrey Bromet |
Political offices
| Preceded by The Duke of Abercorn | Governor of Northern Ireland; 1945–1952 | Succeeded by The Lord Wakehurst |
Peerage of the United Kingdom
| Preceded by Granville George Leveson-Gower | Earl Granville; 2nd creation 1939–1953 | Succeeded by Granville James Leveson-Gower |
