= Fiona Thornewill =

British explorer

Fiona Thornewill (born 10 July 1966) is an English explorer who reached the South Pole solo and unaided in a record 42 days in 2004, walking and skiing over 700 miles in the process.

== Background ==
Born in Upton, Nottinghamshire, England, Fiona was into sports as a child, especially gymnastics, horse-racing and ice-skating. She attended Lowes Wong Junior School in nearby Southwell before going to The Rodney School in Kirklington.

Later, Fiona worked as an administrator for the RAF where she able to gain experience in flying and gliding. She also opened her own gymnasium, but tragedy struck when her husband, Bill, was killed in a road accident.

In 1992, Fiona met her present husband, Mike, who introduced her to outdoor sports such as mountaineering. Mike also had ambitions to cross the South Pole overland, and these plans encouraged Fiona to follow suit.

== Expeditions ==
In 2000, Michael and Fiona became the first married couple to reach the South Pole, along with Catherine Hartley.

In 2001, Mike and Fiona set up an expedition to reach the North Pole, raising money for charity in the process. Guiding them was Canadian mountaineer and arctic adventurer Paul Landry. They reached their destination in 56 days.

Fiona's greatest feat came in 2004 though, when from the edge of the continent at Hercules Inlet, she reached the South Pole in 41 days on 10 January, beating her rival Rosie Stancer in the process. The previous record was 44 days, and the previous best for a woman was 50 days – by the Norwegian Liv Arneson. Walking 22 miles a day, Fiona had to pull a sledge weighing 285 pounds, and her success is perhaps even more remarkable considering she lost her satellite navigation system 10 days in. Base camp then had to follow Fiona's mandatory emergency beacon, which showed location, and temperature only, via satellite link.

As news reached home she was congratulated by friends and family, and husband Mike was part of a party racing to meet her on Antarctica.
