= Earl Granville =

Noble title of the United Kingdom

Earldom of Granville
- Blazon Arms: Quarterly: 1st & 4th, Barry of eight Argent and Gules, a Cross-Flory Sable (Gower); 2nd, Azure, three Laurel-Leaves Or (Leveson); 3rd, Gules, three Clarions Or (Granville), in the centre fess point a Crescent for difference. Crest: A Wolf passant Argent, collared and lined Or. Supporters: On either side a Wolf Argent, plain collared with a line reflexed over the back Gold, charged on the shoulder with an Escutcheon Gules, charged with a Clarion Or.
- Creation date: 10 May 1833
- Creation: Second
- Created by: William IV
- Peerage: Peerage of the United Kingdom
- First holder: Granville Leveson-Gower, 1st Earl Granville
- Present holder: Fergus Leveson-Gower, 6th Earl Granville
- Heir apparent: Granville Leveson-Gower, Lord Leveson
- Subsidiary titles: Viscount Granville; Baron Leveson
- Status: Extant
- Motto: FRANGAS NON FLECTES (You may break, but you will not bend me)

Earl Granville is a title that has been created twice, once in the Peerage of Great Britain and once in the Peerage of the United Kingdom. It is now held by members of the Leveson-Gower family.

== First creation ==
The first creation came in the Peerage of Great Britain in 1715 when Grace Carteret, Lady Carteret, was made Countess Granville and Viscountess Carteret. She was the daughter of John Granville, 1st Earl of Bath, and the widow of George Carteret, 1st Baron Carteret. The Carteret family descended from the celebrated royalist statesman George Carteret, who had been created a baronet, of Melesches, Jersey, in 1645. It was later intended that he should be elevated to the peerage but he died before the title could be granted. As his eldest son, Philip, predeceased him, the peerage was eventually bestowed on his namesake grandson, George, who was made Baron Carteret, of Hawnes in the County of Bedford, in 1681, with remainder to his brothers.

Lord Carteret and Lady Granville were both succeeded by their son, the second Earl. He was a prominent statesman, mainly known under the title Lord Carteret. The titles became extinct in 1776 on the death of his son, the third Earl, without heirs. The Carteret estates were passed on to the late Earl's first cousin, the Hon. Henry Frederick Thynne, second son of Thomas Thynne, 2nd Viscount Weymouth, and his wife Lady Louisa Carteret, daughter of the second Earl Granville. He assumed the surname of Carteret and was created Baron Carteret in 1784.

== Second creation ==
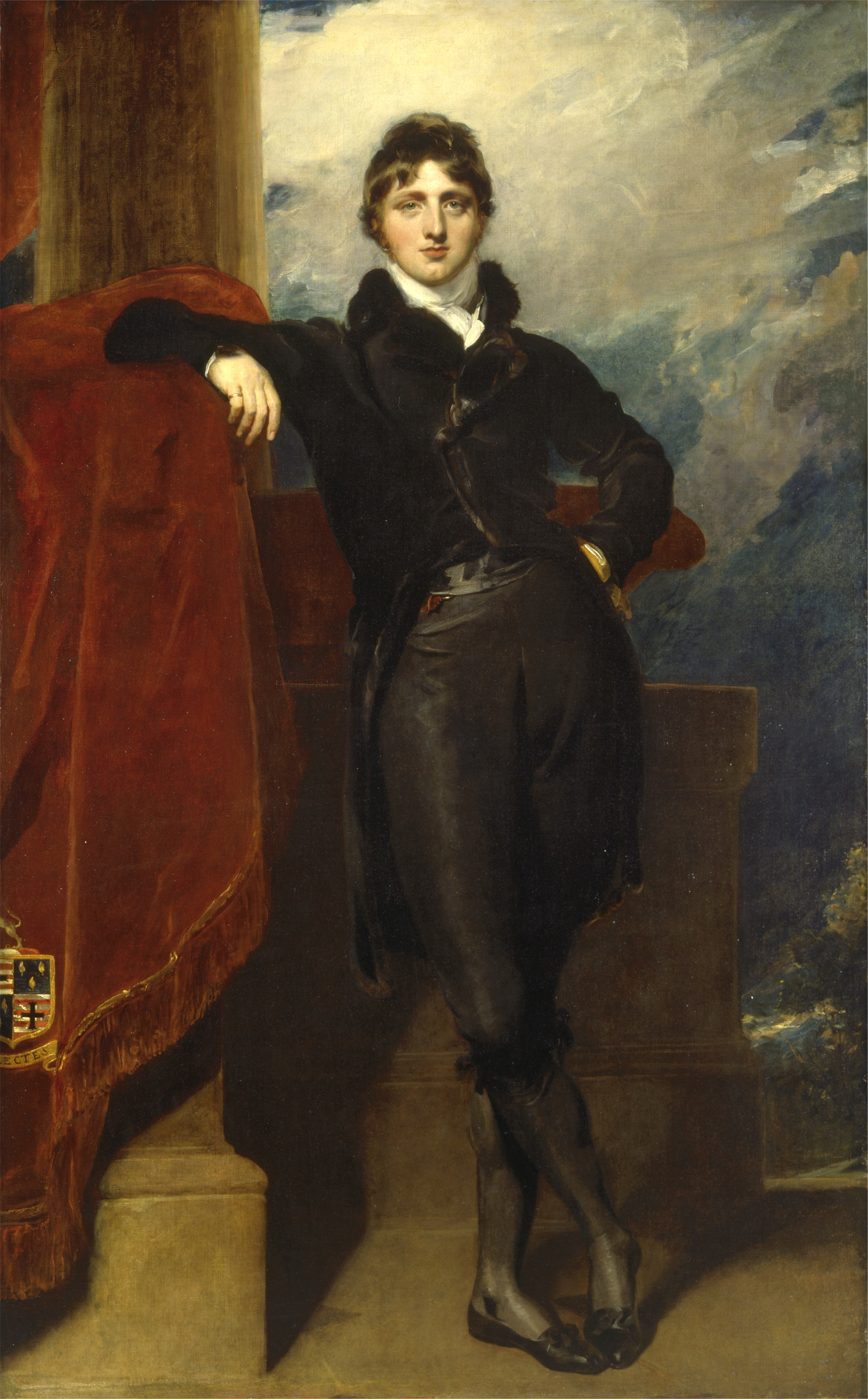
Granville Leveson-Gower, 1st Earl Granville, by Thomas Lawrence

The second creation came in the Peerage of the United Kingdom in 1833 when the noted diplomat Granville Leveson-Gower, 1st Viscount Granville, was made Earl Granville and Baron Leveson, of Stone Park in the County of Stafford. He had already been created Viscount Granville, of Stone Park in the County of Stafford, in 1815. Leveson-Gower was the son of Granville Leveson-Gower, 1st Marquess of Stafford, by his third wife, Susanna. He was the younger half-brother of George Granville Leveson-Gower, 1st Duke of Sutherland, and the uncle of Francis Egerton, 1st Earl of Ellesmere. He was also a great-great-nephew of the aforementioned Grace Carteret, 1st Countess Granville. Hence, the 1833 creation of the earldom of Granville was a revival of the title created in 1715.

Lord Granville was succeeded by his son, the second Earl. He was a prominent Liberal politician and served three times as Foreign Secretary. His son, the third Earl, was also a diplomat and notably served as Ambassador to Belgium from 1928 to 1933. He was succeeded by his younger brother, the fourth Earl. He was a vice-admiral in the Royal Navy and also served as Governor of Northern Ireland from 1945 to 1952. Lord Granville married Lady Rose Constance Bowes-Lyon, second surviving daughter of Claude Bowes-Lyon, 14th Earl of Strathmore and Kinghorne, and elder sister of Lady Elizabeth Bowes-Lyon, wife of George VI.

As of 2017, the titles are held by his grandson, the sixth Earl, who succeeded his father in 1996.

The Hon. Frederick Leveson-Gower, younger son of the first Earl, was Member of Parliament for Derby, Stoke-upon-Trent and Bodmin. His son George Leveson-Gower was also a Member of Parliament.

The family seat is Callernish House, near Lochmaddy, North Uist.

== Carteret baronets, of Melesches (1645) ==
- Sir George Carteret, 1st Baronet (c. 1610–1680)
  - Sir Philip Carteret (died 1672)
- Sir George Carteret, 2nd Baronet (1669–1695) (created Baron Carteret in 1681)

== Barons Carteret (1681) ==
- George Carteret, 1st Baron Carteret (1667–1695)
- John Carteret, 2nd Baron Carteret (1690–1763) (succeeded as Earl Granville in 1744)

== Earls Granville, first creation (1715) ==
- Grace Carteret, 1st Countess Granville (1654–1744)
- John Carteret, 2nd Earl Granville (1690–1763)
- Robert Carteret, 3rd Earl Granville (1721–1776)

== Earls Granville, second creation (1833) ==
- Granville Leveson-Gower, 1st Earl Granville (1773–1846)
- Granville George Leveson-Gower, 2nd Earl Granville (1815–1891)
- Granville George Leveson-Gower, 3rd Earl Granville (1872–1939)
- William Spencer Leveson-Gower, 4th Earl Granville (1880–1953)
- Granville James Leveson-Gower, 5th Earl Granville (1918–1996)
- (Granville George) Fergus Leveson-Gower, 6th Earl Granville (born 1959)

The heir apparent is the present holder's son, Granville George James Leveson-Gower, Lord Leveson (born 1999).

== Family tree ==
Gordon, Leveson-Gower, and Egerton family trees: Earls Gower, Marquesses of Stafford, Earls and Dukes of Sutherland and subsidiary titles

Earl of Sutherland and Lord Strathnaver, 1228 or 1231
William de Moravia a.k.a. Sutherland c. 1210–1248; 1st Earl of Sutherland, etc.
William de Moravia a.k.a. Sutherland c. 1235–1307; 2nd Earl of Sutherland, etc.
William de Moravia a.k.a. Sutherland fl. Early 14th century 3rd Earl of Sutherland, etc. | Kenneth de Moravia a.k.a. Sutherland d. 1333; 4th Earl of Sutherland, etc.
William de Moravia a.k.a. Sutherland d. 1370; 5th Earl of Sutherland, etc.
Robert Sutherland d. 1444; 6th Earl of Sutherland, etc.
John Sutherland d. 1460; 7th Earl of Sutherland, etc.
Alex Sutherland d. 1456; Master of Sutherland | John Sutherland d. 1508; 8th Earl of Sutherland, etc.
John Sutherland d. 1514; 9th Earl of Sutherland, etc. | Elizabeth Sutherland d. 1535; 10th Countess of Sutherland and Lady Strathnaver
Earldom of Sutherland resigned, 1527
Alexander Gordon c. 1505-1530; Earl of Sutherland, etc., 1527
John Gordon; 1525–1567; 11th Earl of Sutherland, etc.
Alexander Gordon d. 1594; 12th Earl of Sutherland, etc.
John Gordon; 1576–1615; 13th Earl of Sutherland, etc.
John Gordon; 1609–1679; 14th Earl of Sutherland, etc.
George Gordon; 1633–1703; 15th Earl of Sutherland, etc.
John Gordon; 1661–1733; 16th Earl of Sutherland, etc.
Baron Gower of Sittenham in the County of York, 1703
William Gordon; 1683–1720 styled Lord Strathnaver | John Leveson-Gower; 1675–1709; 1st Baron Gower, 5th Baronet
Earl Gower and Viscount Trentham of Trentham in the County of Stafford, 1746
William Sutherland; 1708–1750; 17th Earl of Sutherland, etc. | John Leveson-Gower; 1694–1754; 1st Earl Gower, etc., 2nd Baron Gower
Marquess of Stafford, 1786
William Sutherland; 1735–1766; 18th Earl of Sutherland, etc. | Granville Leveson-Gower; 1721–1803; 1st Marquess of Stafford, 2nd Earl Gower, etc., 3rd Baron Gower
Duke of Sutherland, 1833 | Viscount Granville, of Stone Park in the County of Stafford, 1815; Earl Granville (2nd creation) and Baron Leveson of Stone Park in the County of Stafford, 1833
Lady Elizabeth Sutherland; 1765–1839; 19th Countess of Sutherland, etc. suo jure | George Granville Leveson-Gower; 1758–1833; 1st Duke of Sutherland, 2nd Marquess of Stafford, 3rd Earl Gower, etc., 4th Baron Gower | Granville Leveson-Gower; 1773–1846; 1st Earl Granville, etc.
Earl of Ellesmere and Viscount Brackley of Brackley in the County of Northampton, 1846
George Granville Sutherland-Leveson-Gower; 1786–1861; 2nd Duke of Sutherland, 3rd Marquess of Stafford, 20th Earl of Sutherland, etc., 4th Earl Gower, etc., 5th Baron Gower | Francis Egerton; 1800–1857; 1st Earl of Ellesmere, etc.
George Granville Sutherland-Leveson-Gower; 1828–1892; 3rd Duke of Sutherland, 4th Marquess of Stafford, 21st Earl of Sutherland, etc., 5th Earl Gower, etc., 6th Baron Gower | George Granville Francis Egerton; 1823–1862; 2nd Earl of Ellesmere, etc. | Granville George Leveson-Gower; 1815–1891; 2nd Earl Granville, etc.
George Granville Sutherland-Leveson-Gower; 1850–1858; Earl Gower | Cromartie Sutherland-Leveson-Gower; 1851–1913; 4th Duke of Sutherland, 5th Marquess of Stafford, 22nd Earl of Sutherland, etc., 6th Earl Gower, etc., 7th Baron Gower | Francis Charles Granville Egerton; 1847–1914; 3rd Earl of Ellesmere, etc.
George Granville Sutherland-Leveson-Gower; 1888–1963; 5th Duke of Sutherland, 6th Marquess of Stafford, 23rd Earl of Sutherland, etc., 7th Earl Gower, etc., 8th Baron Gower | Lord Alastair St Clair; 1890–1921; Sutherland-Leveson-Gower | John Francis Granville Scrope Egerton; 1872–1944; 4th Earl of Ellesmere, etc. | Thomas Henry Frederick Egerton; 1876–1953 | Granville George Leveson-Gower; 1872–1939; 3rd Earl Granville, etc. | William Spencer Leveson-Gower; 1880–1953; 4th Earl Granville, etc.
Elizabeth Millicent Sutherland; 1921–2019; 24th Countess of Sutherland, etc. suo jure | John Sutherland Egerton; 1915–2000; 6th Duke of Sutherland, 7th Marquess of Stafford, 5th Earl of Ellesmere, etc., 8th Earl Gower, etc., 9th Baron Gower | Reginald Cyril Egerton; 1905–1992 | Granville James Leveson-Gower; 1918–1996; 5th Earl Granville, etc.
Alastair Charles St Clair Sutherland b. 1947; 25th Earl of Sutherland, etc. | Francis Ronald Egerton b. 1940; 7th Duke of Sutherland, 8th Marquess of Stafford, 6th Earl of Ellesmere, etc., 9th Earl Gower, etc., 10th Baron Gower | (Granville George) Fergus Leveson-Gower b. 1959; 6th Earl Granville, etc.
Rachel Elizabeth Sutherland b. 1970 styled Mistress of Sutherland | Alexander Charles Robert Sutherland; 1981–2022 styled Lord Strathnaver | James Granville Egerton b. 1975 styled Marquess of Stafford | George James Leveson-Gower b. 1999
Heir presumptive to the Earldom of Sutherland | Heir apparent to the Dukedom of Sutherland and Earldom of Ellesmere | Heir apparent to the Earldom of Granville

== See also ==
- Earl of Bath (1661 creation)
- Baron Carteret
- Duke of Sutherland
- Countess of Sutherland
- Earl of Ellesmere
- Earl of Cromartie
