= Granville Leveson-Gower, 3rd Earl Granville =

British diplomat (1872–1939)

The Right Honourable The Earl Granville GCMG GCVO PC
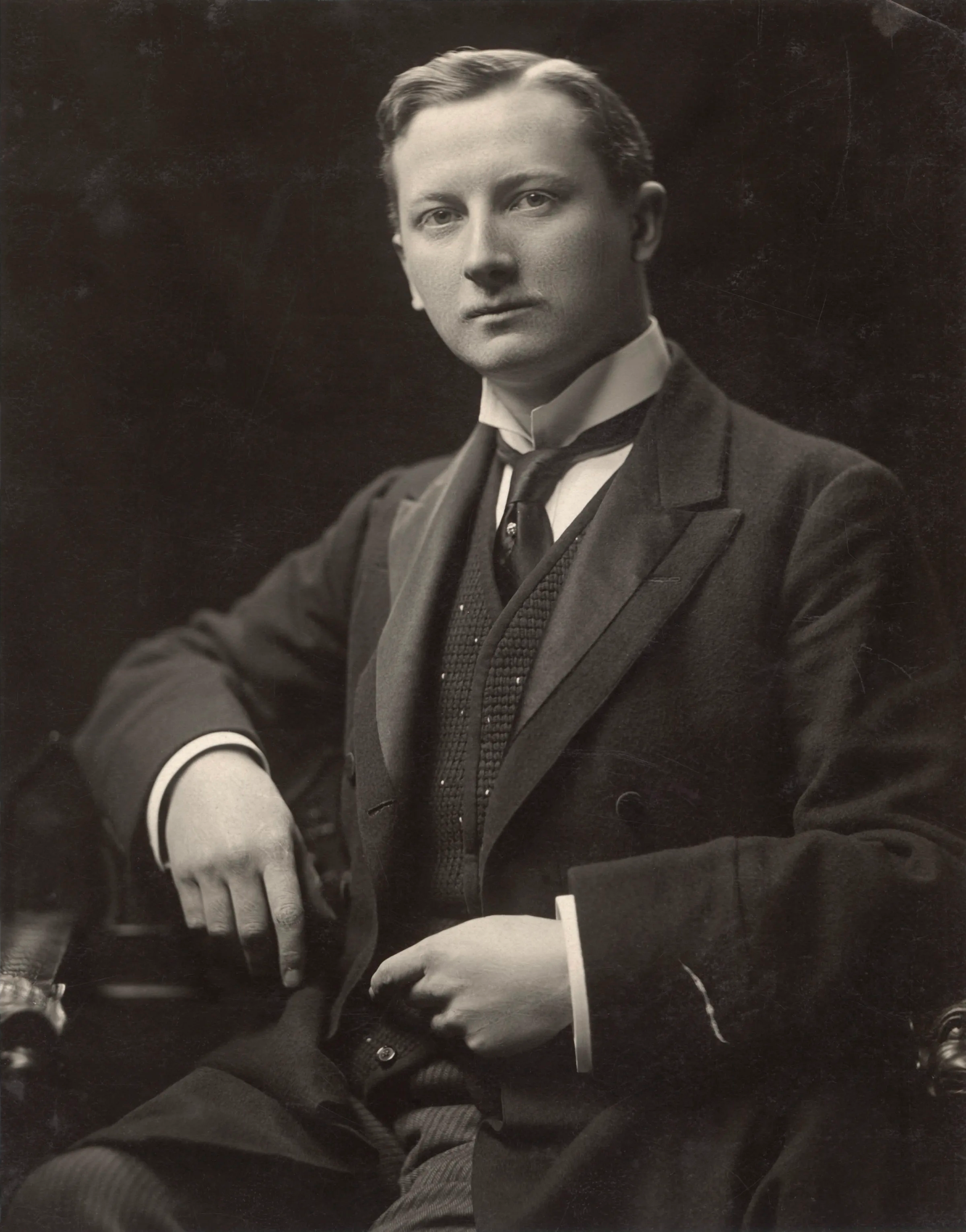
- Portrait by H. Walter Barnett, c. 1904
- Born: 4 March 1872
- Died: 21 July 1939 (aged 67)
- Education: Eton College
- Occupation: Diplomat
- Years active: 1893–1933
- Spouse: Nina Ayesha Baring (m. 1900)
- Parent(s): Granville George Leveson-Gower, 2nd Earl Granville; Castila Rosalind Campbell
- Relatives: William Leveson-Gower, 4th Earl Granville (brother)
- Family: Leveson-Gower

Granville George Leveson-Gower, 3rd Earl Granville GCMG GCVO PC (4 March 1872 – 21 July 1939) was a British diplomat from the Leveson-Gower family who was an envoy to several countries.

== Career ==
The elder son of the 2nd Earl Granville, Leveson-Gower was educated at Eton College and joined the Diplomatic Service in 1893 as an attaché in Berlin. He served in Cairo, Vienna, The Hague and Brussels, then was appointed back to Berlin with the rank of Counsellor in 1911. In 1913 he was appointed to Paris, again as counsellor, and moved to Bordeaux when the French government relocated there in September 1914 as the German army approached the capital before the First Battle of the Marne.

On 1 January 1917 he was appointed Diplomatic Agent to the Greek provisional government of Eleftherios Venizelos in Salonika, shortly afterwards formalised as Minister Plenipotentiary.

In June 1917, King Constantine abdicated, the previous British Minister to the Greek Government, Sir Francis Elliot, departed and Granville became official Minister to Greece in Athens. He was Minister to Denmark 1921–26, Minister to the Netherlands 1926–28 and Ambassador to Belgium and Luxembourg 1928–33.

As a Privy Counsellor, Earl Granville took part in the official procedures legalising the accession of King Edward VIII in 1936 and, later that year, his abdication and the accession of King George VI.

== Honours ==
Earl Granville was appointed MVO in 1904, raised to CVO in 1913 on the occasion of King George V's visit to Berlin, and knighted GCVO in the 1914 Birthday Honours. He was given the additional, senior knighthood of KCMG in the 1924 New Year Honours and raised to GCMG in the 1932 Birthday Honours. He was made a Privy Counsellor in 1928.

=== Orders ===
The Earl received several awards and orders from European foreign dignitaries.

- The King of Belgium awarded him the Order of Leopold.
- Awarded Order of the Dannebrog from Denmark.
- Awarded Order of the Polar Star from Sweden.
- Awarded Order of the Immaculate Conception of Vila Viçosa from Portugal.
- Awarded Order of the Crown (Prussia).

He had also been a Lord-in-waiting to Queen Victoria in 1895, to King Edward VII from 1905 to 1910 and to King George V from 1910 to 1915.

== Family ==
On 27 September 1900, he married Nina Ayesha Baring (daughter of the diplomat Walter Baring, a grandson of Sir Francis Baring, 1st Baronet) but, in 1939, died without issue and his titles passed to his brother William.

Political offices
Preceded by Robert Collier, 2nd Baron Monkswell	Lord-in-waiting; 1895	Succeeded by John Henniker-Major, 5th Baron Henniker
Preceded by Rudolph Feilding, 9th Earl of Denbigh	Lord-in-waiting; 1905–1915	Succeeded by Arthur Annesley, 11th Viscount Valentia
Diplomatic posts
Preceded by Sir Francis Elliot	Envoy Extraordinary and Minister Plenipotentiary to His Majesty the King of Greece; 1917–1921	Succeeded by Francis Lindley
Preceded by Sir Charles Marling	Envoy Extraordinary and Minister Plenipotentiary to His Majesty the King of Denmark and Iceland; 1921–1926	Succeeded by Sir Milne Cheetham
Preceded by Sir Charles Marling	Envoy Extraordinary and Minister Plenipotentiary to Her Majesty the Queen of the Netherlands; 1926–1928	Succeeded by Sir Odo Russell
Preceded by Sir George Grahame	Ambassador Extraordinary and Plenipotentiary to His Majesty the King of the Belgians, and Envoy Extraordinary and Minister Plenipotentiary to Her Royal Highness the Grand Duchess of Luxemburg; 1928–1933	Succeeded by Sir George Clerk
Peerage of the United Kingdom
Preceded by Granville Leveson-Gower	Earl Granville; 2nd creation 1891–1939	Succeeded by William Leveson-Gower
