= Kilgraston School =

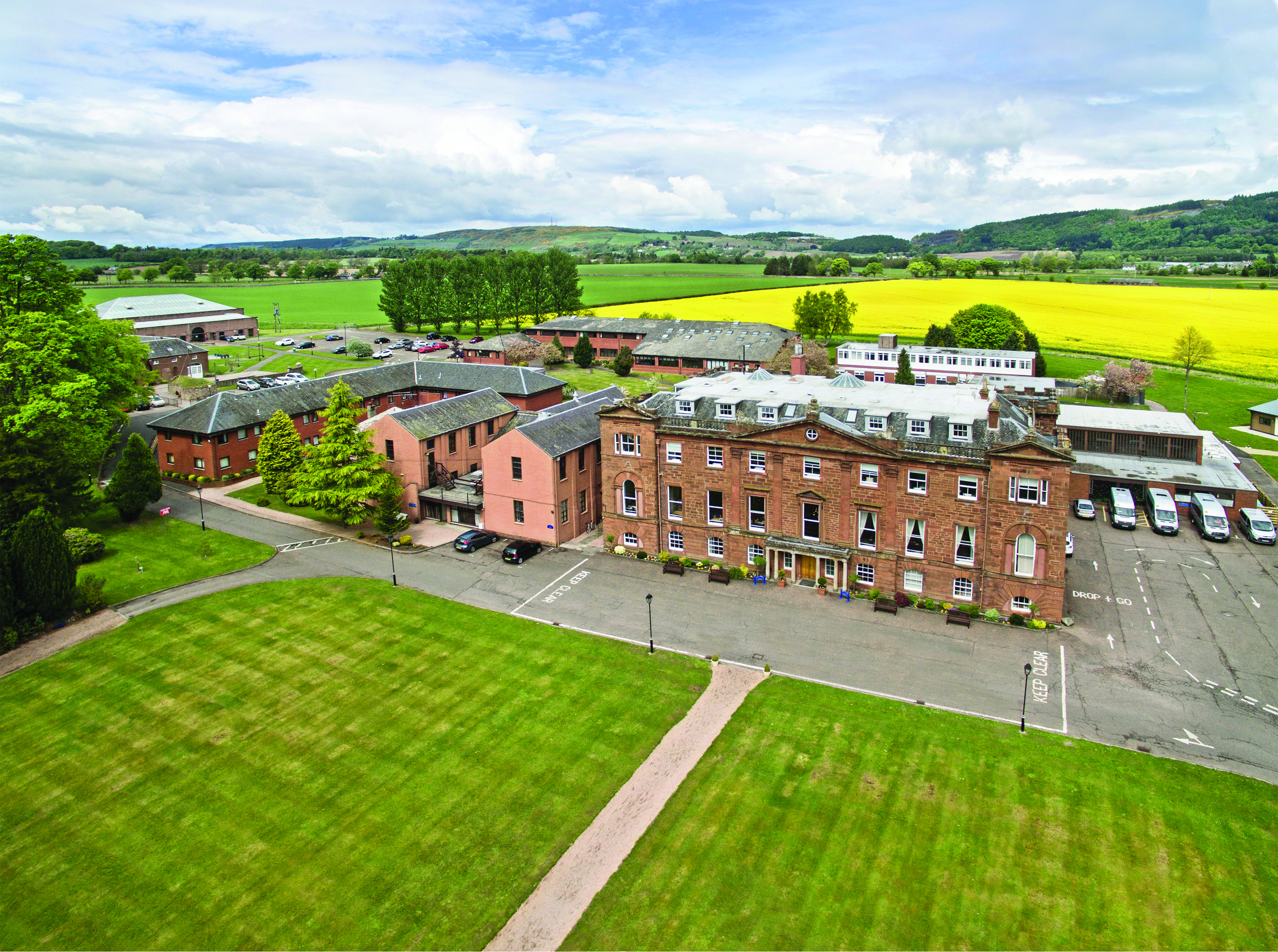

Location
- Bridge of Earn; Perth, PH2 9BQ; Scotland; 56.3414°N 3.416°W

Information
- Type: Private day and boarding
- Motto: Act with determination
- Religious affiliation: Roman Catholic
- Established: 1930
- Founder: Society of the Sacred Heart
- Closed: 2024
- Local authority: Perth and Kinross
- Headteacher: Tanya Davie
- Gender: Girls (Senior school) Co-educational (Junior school)
- Age: 4 to 18
- Enrolment: 550
- Campus: Rural; 72 acres (290,000 m^{2})
- Website: www.kilgraston.com

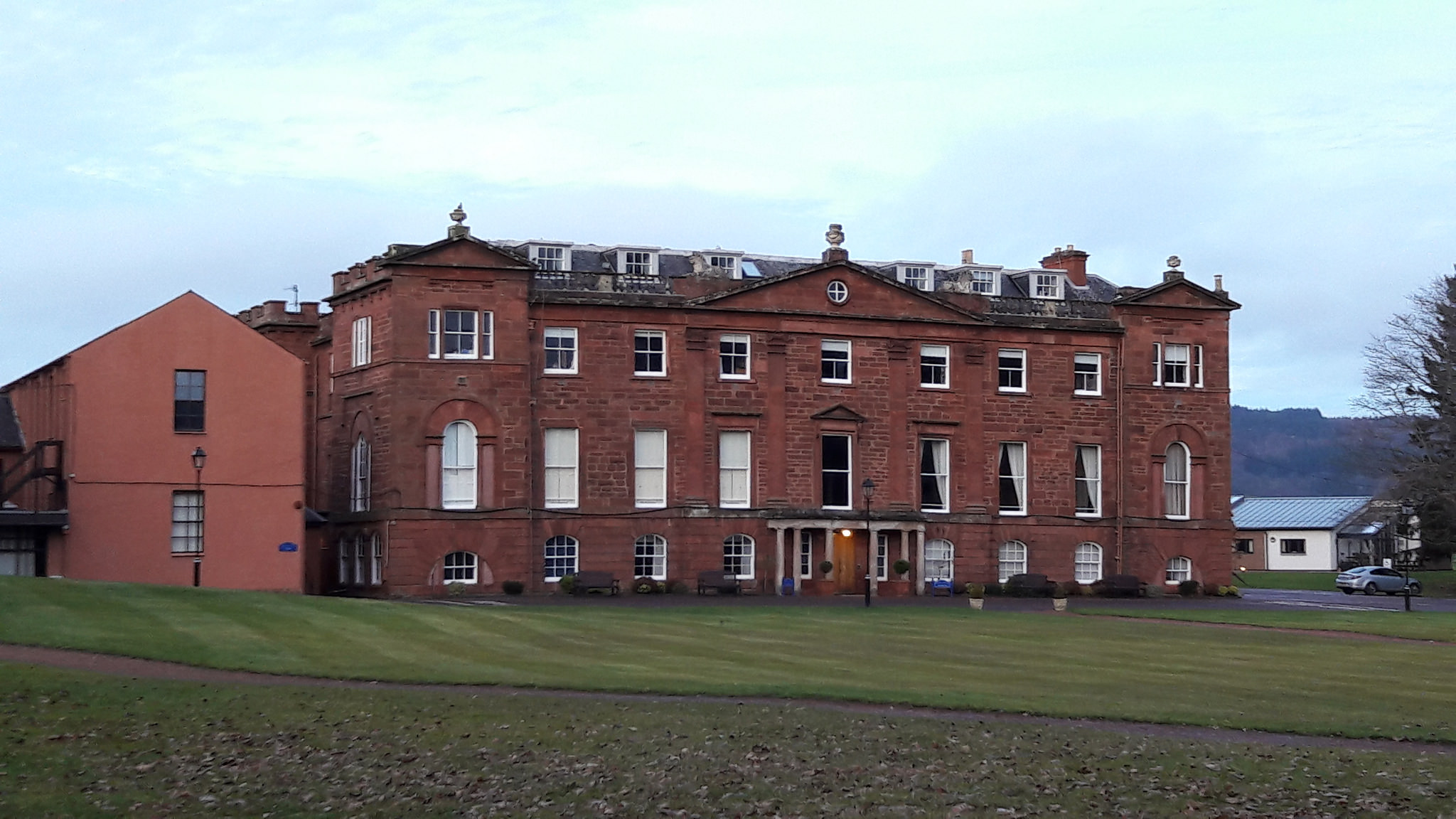
Front of school

Kilgraston School was a Scottish private boarding and day school that offered single-sex education for girls aged from five to eighteen years old, and a co-educational junior school for girls and boys aged from five to twelve. Boarding was available for girls only, aged eight years old and above.

The school was centred on a mansion house set in 72 acres (290,000 m^{2}) of parkland, at Bridge of Earn, 3 miles (4.8 km) south of Perth. It was the only Catholic boarding school in Scotland and is located within the Diocese of Dunkeld. The school had links with the boys' school Merchiston Castle School, in Edinburgh, and they occasionally co-organised socials and functions together. Kilgraston had music and arts departments, hockey, tennis and swimming academies, and was Scotland's only school with an on-site equestrian centre. In 2013 Kilgraston was ranked fourth in the top Scottish schools by Advanced Highers. In 2015, Kilgraston was named as the Sunday Times top performing independent school for Highers and Advanced Highers 2015.

The school had Junior Years (ages 5–12), Senior School (ages 13–16) and Sixth Form. It was a member of the Girls' Schools Association.

== History ==
=== Building ===
Kilgraston's earliest records date back to the 13th century where it was called Gilgryston. John Grant, the eldest son of Patrick Grant of Glenlochy, in Strath Spey, Inverness-shire, and whose principal wealth was made in Jamaica, was for several years a member of the Assembly there. He became an assistant Judge of Jamaica's Supreme Court and eventually succeeded Thomas French as Chief Justice of that island in January 1783, which office he held until 1790. Also, in 1783, he was confirmed as an armiger by the Lord Lyon King of Arms. Towards the end of the 18th century, Grant purchased the contiguous estates of Kilgraston and Pitcaithly from the Murray and Craigie families, situated in the east end of the beautiful and rich valley of Strath Earn, and extending over part of the Ochil Hills. He died without issue at Edinburgh on 29 March 1793, and is buried under a marble tablet in St Cuthbert's Churchyard. He was succeeded in his estates by his brother Francis (d. 1819), who built the mansion. The mansion was used as a private home until World War I, during which it was used as a hospital.

=== School ===
In 1930 the house and grounds were purchased by the Society of the Sacred Heart and opened as a school with 40 boarders. The Society ran the school as a charitable trust until 2000 when it became a private school. It briefly participated in the Assisted Places Scheme during the 1990s until its abolishment. In 2003, it absorbed the nearby all-girls Butterstone Prep School due to the latter's financial difficulties. Its girls were transferred 22 miles to Kilgraston and one of the boarding houses was named Butterstone after the school.

Capital investments included the opening of a 25m indoor swimming pool complex and upgrades to the equestrian centre (Kilgraston was the only school in Scotland with equestrian facilities on campus) including a 60m x 40m floodlit arena and an international sized all-weather floodlit hockey pitch. Other developments had been a new theatre with retractable seating for 150, a bistro style dining room, sports pavilion as well as an upgrade of the residential facilities. As a member of the Network of Sacred Heart Schools, there were exchange and twinning programmes available for girls to interact with fellow students from sister schools around the world. Sixth Form pupils had access to their own study centre with individual work stations. In 2014, Professor Yellowlees, Chair of the Royal Society of Chemistry and Vice President and Head of the School of Science and Engineering at Edinburgh University, formally opened Kilgraston's £1 million Science Centre.

In January 2012, Kilgraston was named "Independent School of the Year" ahead of 27 other independent schools across Britain at the Independent School Awards. It was also nominated for the Outstanding Strategic Initiative Award in recognition of the changes the school had made to achieve 55% growth in the last five years and received the Outstanding Financial Initiative prize for its £2m investment in facilities and the introduction of a number of Sports Academies.

In June 2023, it was announced that Kilgraston would be permanently closing at the end of the 2022–2023 academic year. Within 4 days of this announcement £1.2 million had been pledged to Kilgraston from current and former parents, alumnae and friends of the school with a goal of Kilgraston remaining open. 6 days after the closure announcement, Kilgraston was reported to be in final talks with a long term investor, Achieve Education Limited.

In August 2024, it was announced that Kilgraston would close immediately due to a sale falling through with Achieve Education Limited.

In 2025, the school was put up for auction for £1.6 million. The new owner, Lumara Capital, stated in October 2025 that it wanted to see Kilgraston’s “outstanding facilities" come alive once more.

== Academics ==
In August 2023, 50% of grades at AH were A grades against a national average of 33.7% and 76.5% of grades were A-B against a national average of 59.7%. At Higher level, 52% of pupils achieved a grade A and 79% achieved a grade A-B.

== Boarding ==
Boarding was provided to girls aged 8 and above. Approximately half of pupils were boarders, most of whom had boarded on weekdays or on flexible arrangements. The girls resided in three boarding houses: Butterstone and Austin (Junior Years), Mater (Senior School) and Barat or Swinton (Sixth Form). Senior School and Sixth Form boarders had their own bedrooms.

== Former staff and pupils ==
- Louise Baxter, former Scotland international hockey player and Head of PE
- Mairi Gougeon, politician

== Sources ==
- Burke, John, Esq., A Genealogical History of The Commoners of Great Britain and Ireland enjoying Territorial Possessions or High Official Rank, London, 1835, volume II, p. 613.
- Smith, John, & Balfour Paul, Sir James, editor, Monumental Inscriptions in St. Cuthbert's Churchyard, Edinburgh, Scottish Record Society, Edinburgh, 1915, p. 13.
