= Granville Leveson-Gower, 2nd Earl Granville =

British statesman and diplomat

The Right Honourable The Earl Granville KG PC FRS
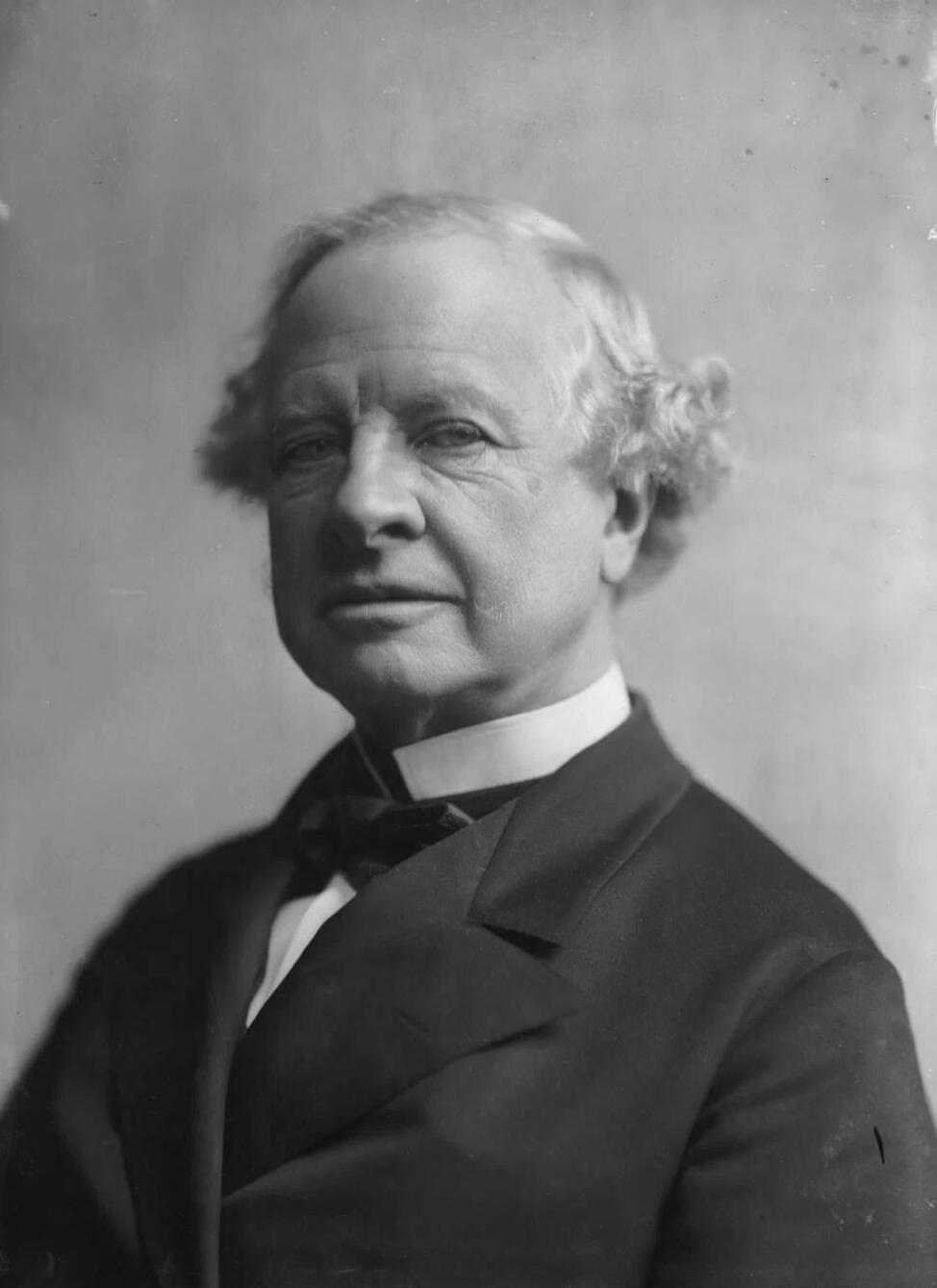
- The 2nd Earl Granville, by Alexander Bassano, c. 1885–90

Leader of the House of Lords
- In office 6 February 1886 – 20 July 1886
- Monarch: Victoria
- Prime Minister: William Ewart Gladstone
- Preceded by: The 3rd Marquess of Salisbury
- Succeeded by: The 3rd Marquess of Salisbury
- In office 28 April 1880 – 9 June 1885
- Monarch: Victoria
- Prime Minister: William Ewart Gladstone
- Preceded by: The Earl of Beaconsfield
- Succeeded by: The 3rd Marquess of Salisbury
- In office 9 December 1868 – 17 February 1874
- Monarch: Victoria
- Prime Minister: William Ewart Gladstone
- Preceded by: The Earl of Malmesbury
- Succeeded by: The Duke of Richmond
- In office 18 June 1859 – 29 October 1865
- Monarch: Victoria
- Prime Minister: The Viscount Palmerston
- Preceded by: The 14th Earl of Derby
- Succeeded by: The Earl Russell
- In office 8 February 1855 – 21 February 1858
- Monarch: Victoria
- Prime Minister: The Viscount Palmerston
- Preceded by: The Earl of Aberdeen
- Succeeded by: The 14th Earl of Derby

Foreign Secretary
- In office 28 April 1880 – 24 June 1885
- Monarch: Victoria
- Prime Minister: William Ewart Gladstone
- Preceded by: The 3rd Marquess of Salisbury
- Succeeded by: The 3rd Marquess of Salisbury
- In office 6 July 1870 – 21 February 1874
- Monarch: Victoria
- Prime Minister: William Ewart Gladstone
- Preceded by: The Earl of Clarendon
- Succeeded by: The 15th Earl of Derby
- In office 26 December 1851 – 27 February 1852
- Monarch: Victoria
- Prime Minister: Lord John Russell
- Preceded by: The Viscount Palmerston
- Succeeded by: The Earl of Malmesbury

Secretary of State for the Colonies
- In office 6 February 1886 – 20 July 1886
- Monarch: Victoria
- Prime Minister: William Ewart Gladstone
- Preceded by: Frederick Stanley
- Succeeded by: Edward Stanhope
- In office 9 December 1868 – 6 July 1870
- Monarch: Victoria
- Prime Minister: William Ewart Gladstone
- Preceded by: The Duke of Buckingham and Chandos
- Succeeded by: The Earl of Kimberley

Lord President of the Council
- In office 18 June 1859 – 6 July 1866
- Monarch: Victoria
- Prime Minister: The Viscount Palmerston; The Earl Russell
- Preceded by: The 2nd Marquess of Salisbury
- Succeeded by: The Duke of Buckingham and Chandos
- In office 8 February 1855 – 26 February 1858
- Monarch: Victoria
- Prime Minister: The Viscount Palmerston
- Preceded by: Lord John Russell
- Succeeded by: The 2nd Marquess of Salisbury
- In office 28 December 1852 – 12 June 1854
- Monarch: Victoria
- Prime Minister: The Earl of Aberdeen
- Preceded by: The Earl of Lonsdale
- Succeeded by: Lord John Russell

Chancellor of the Duchy of Lancaster
- In office 21 June 1854 – 30 January 1855
- Monarch: Victoria
- Prime Minister: The Earl of Aberdeen
- Preceded by: Edward Strutt
- Succeeded by: The Earl of Harrowby

Additional positions

Personal details
- Born: 11 May 1815 London, England
- Died: 31 March 1891 (aged 75) London, England
- Party: Liberal
- Spouse(s): Mary Louise von Dalberg (m. 1840; died 1860) Castila Rosalind Campbell (m. 1865)
- Children: Granville Leveson-Gower, 3rd Earl Granville; William Leveson-Gower, 4th Earl Granville
- Parent(s): Granville Leveson-Gower, 1st Earl Granville; Lady Harriet Cavendish
- Education: Christ Church, Oxford

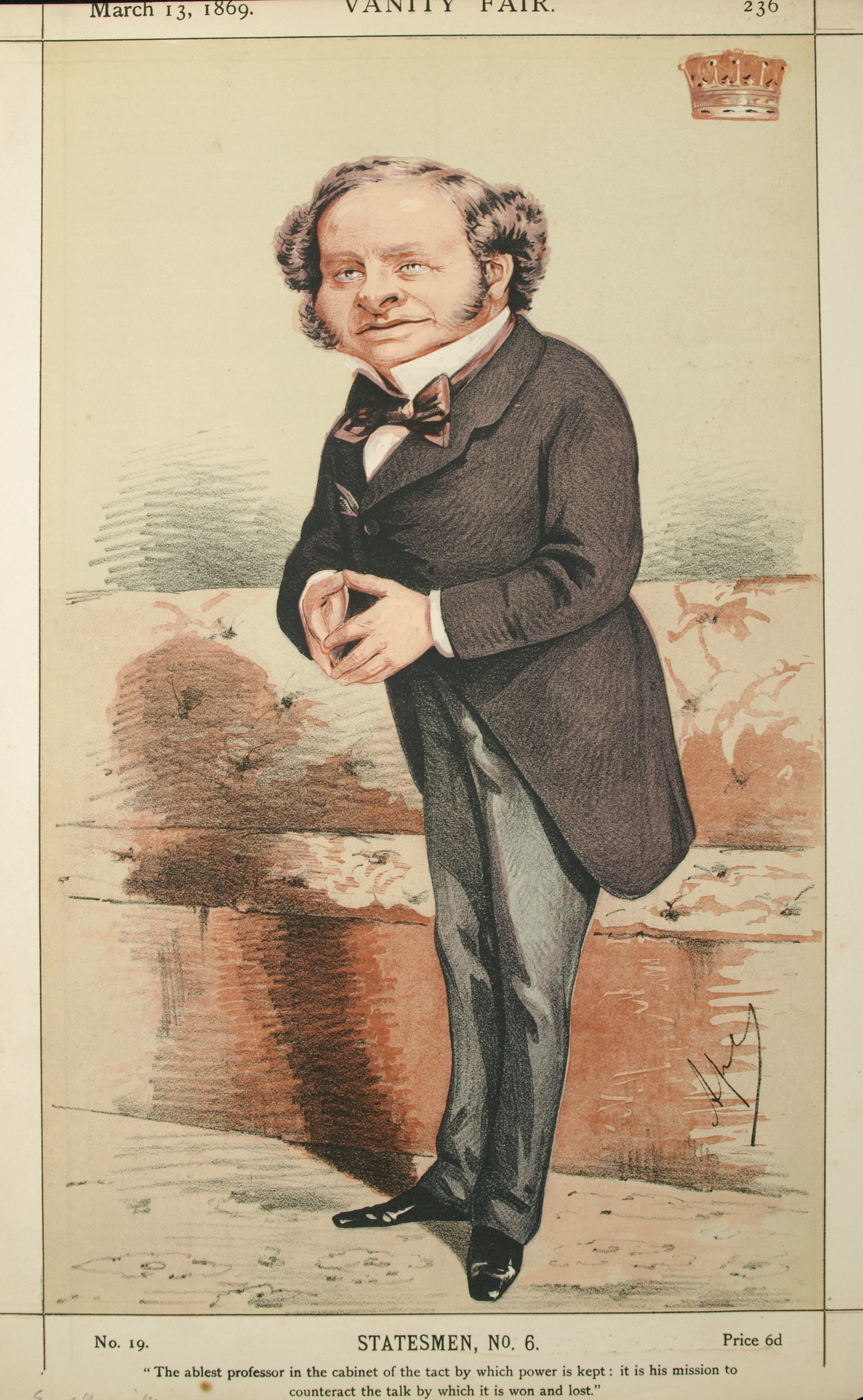
Caricature by Ape published in Vanity Fair in 1869.

Granville George Leveson-Gower, 2nd Earl Granville (11 May 1815 – 31 March 1891), styled Lord Leveson until 1846, was a British Liberal statesman and diplomat from the Leveson-Gower family. He is best remembered for his service as Secretary of State for Foreign Affairs.

His foreign policy kept Britain free from European wars and improved relations with the United States after the strain during the American Civil War.

== Background and education ==
Leveson-Gower was born in London, the eldest son of Granville Leveson-Gower, 1st Earl Granville and Lady Harriet Cavendish, daughter of Lady Georgiana Spencer and William Cavendish, 5th Duke of Devonshire. His father was a younger son of Granville Leveson-Gower, 1st Marquess of Stafford and his third wife; an elder son with his second wife (a daughter of the 1st Duke of Bridgwater) became the 2nd Marquess of Stafford, and his marriage with the daughter and heiress of the 18th Earl of Sutherland (Countess of Sutherland in her own right) led to the merging of the Gower and Stafford titles in that of the Dukes of Sutherland (created 1833), who represent the elder branch of the family. He was educated at Eton and Christ Church, Oxford.

== Political career ==
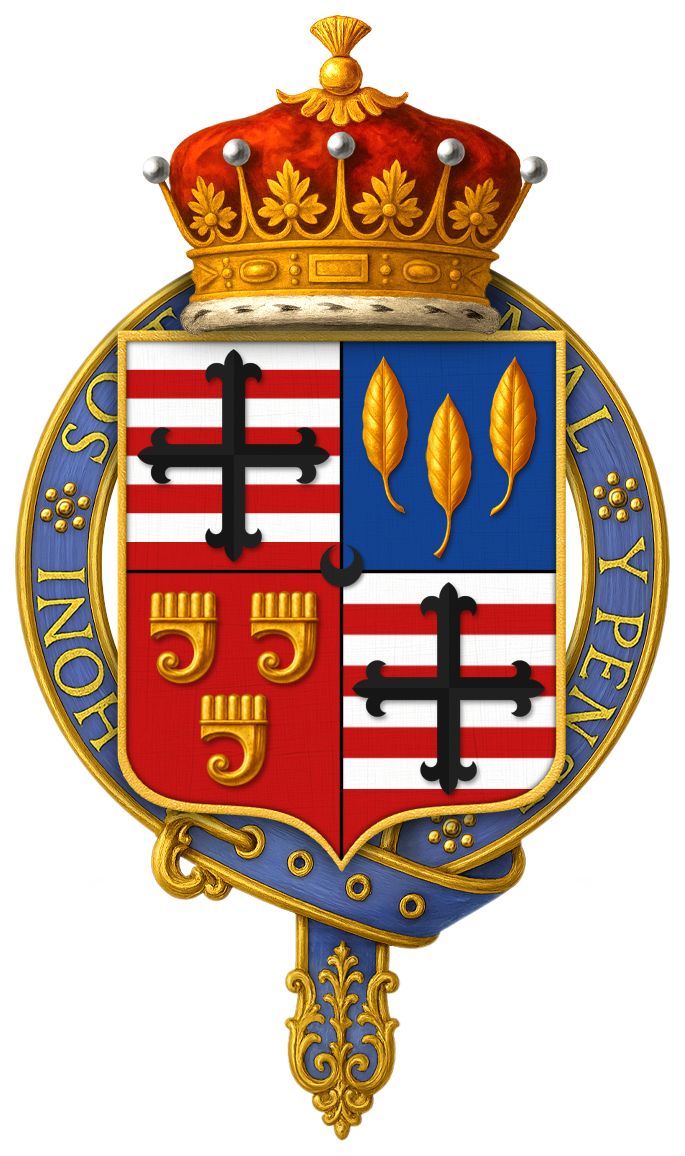
Quartered arms of Granville Leveson-Gower, 2nd Earl Granville, KG, PC, FRS

Leveson-Gower went to Paris for a short time under his father, and in 1836 was elected to Parliament as Whig MP for Morpeth. For a short time (1840-1) he was Under-Secretary of State for Foreign Affairs in Lord Melbourne's ministry. From 1841 until his father's death in 1846, when he succeeded to the title, he sat for Lichfield.

In the House of Lords he distinguished himself as a Free Trader, and when Lord John Russell formed a government in 1846 he made him Master of the Buckhounds. He became Vice-President of the Board of Trade in 1848, and took a prominent part in promoting the Great Exhibition of 1851. Having already been admitted to the Cabinet, for about two months at the end of 1851 and the start of 1852 he succeeded Palmerston as Foreign Secretary until Russell's defeat in 1852.

When Lord Aberdeen formed his coalition government at the end of 1852, Granville became first Lord President of the Council, and then Chancellor of the Duchy of Lancaster (1854). Under Lord Palmerston (1855) he was again President of the Council. His interest in education (a subject associated with this office) led to his election (1856) as chancellor of the University of London, a post he held for thirty-five years; and he was a prominent champion of the movement for the admission of women, and also of the teaching of modern languages.

From 1855 Lord Granville led the Liberals in the Upper House, both in office and, after Palmerston's resignation in 1858, in opposition. In 1856 he was head of the British mission to Tsar Alexander II of Russia's coronation in Moscow. In June 1859 Queen Victoria asked him to form a ministry, but he was unable to do so, and Palmerston again became Prime Minister, with Russell as Foreign Secretary and Granville once again as President of the Council.

He retained his office when, on Palmerston's death in 1865, Lord Russell (now a peer) became Prime Minister and took over the leadership in the House of Lords. Granville, now an established Liberal leader, was made Lord Warden of the Cinque Ports.

He received an honorary degree from Cambridge University in 1864.

== Military career ==
He served in the part-time Staffordshire Yeomanry, being commissioned as a major on 12 December 1848 and being promoted to lieutenant-colonel on 3 July 1854. He continued in the regiment until the early 1860s. As Lord Warden, he was appointed honorary colonel of the 1st Cinque Ports Artillery Volunteers on 23 April 1866.

== Industrial career ==
Lord Granville owned coal and ironstone mines at Stoke-on-Trent and was the principal shareholder of the Shelton Iron & Steel Co In 1873 the company operated 8 blast furnaces and 97 puddling furnaces. He also held shares in the Lilleshall Company.

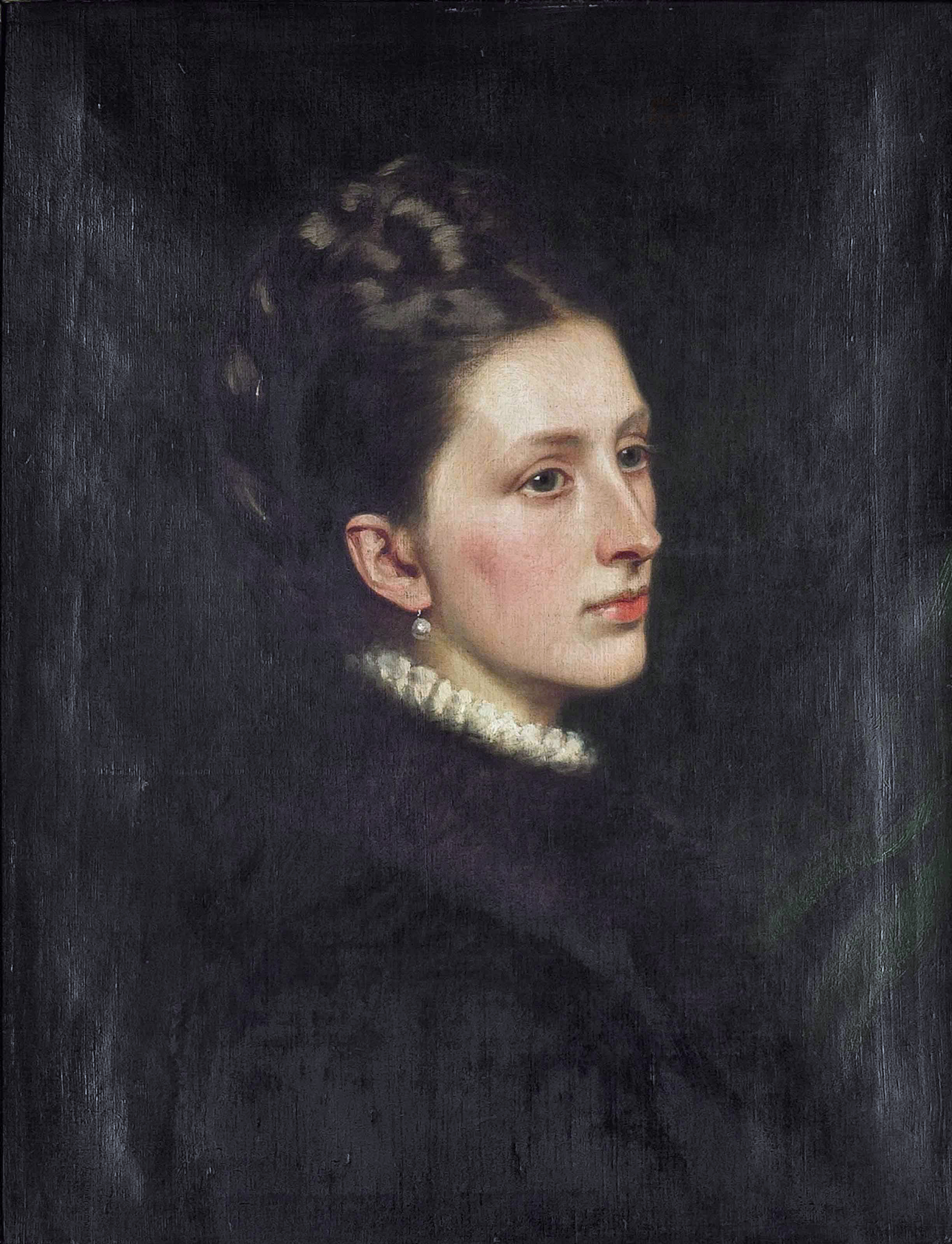
Castila Rosalind, Countess Granville (1847–1938)

== Foreign policy ==
During the American Civil War, Granville was non-interventionist along with the majority of Palmerston's cabinet. His memorandum against intervention in September 1862 drew Prime Minister Palmerston's attention. The document proved to be a strong reason for Palmerston's refusal to intervene and for Britain's relations with the North to remain basically stable for the rest of the conflict despite tensions. From 1866 to 1868, he was in opposition, but in December 1868 he became Colonial Secretary in Gladstone's first ministry. His tact was invaluable to the government in carrying the Irish Church and Land Bills through the House of Lords. On 27 June 1870, on Lord Clarendon's death, he became foreign secretary. With war clouds gathering in Europe, Granville worked to authorise preliminary talks to settle American disputes and in appointing the British High Commission to sail to the United States and negotiate the most comprehensive treaty of the nineteenth century in Anglo-American relations with an American commission in Washington.

Lord Granville's name is mainly associated with his career as foreign secretary (1870–1874 and 1880–1885). It brought better relations with the United States, and it was innovative in supporting Gladstone's wish to settle British-American fisheries and Civil War disputes over the Confederate cruisers built in Britain, like the Alabama, through international arbitration in 1872. For example, the long-standing San Juan Island Water Boundary Dispute in Puget Sound, which had been left ambiguous in the Oregon Treaty of 1846 to salve relations and get a treaty sorting out the primary differences, was arbitrated by the German Emperor also in 1872. In putting British-American relations up to the world as a model for how to resolve disputes peacefully, Granville helped create a breakthrough in international relations.

The Franco-Prussian War of 1870 broke out within a few days of Lord Granville's quoting in the House of Lords (11 July 1870) the opinion of the permanent under-secretary (Edmund Hammond) that "he had never known so great a lull in foreign affairs." Russia took advantage of the situation to denounce the Black Sea clauses of the Treaty of Paris, and Lord Granville's protest was ineffectual. In 1871 an intermediate zone between Asiatic Russia and Afghanistan was agreed on between him and Shuvalov; but in 1873 Russia took possession of the Khanate of Khiva, within the neutral zone, and Lord Granville had to accept the aggression (See also: The Great Game).

When the Conservatives came into power in 1874, his part for the next six years was to criticise Disraeli's "spirited" foreign policy, and to defend his own more pliant methods. He returned to the foreign office in 1880, only to find an anti-British spirit developing in German policy which the temporising methods of the Liberal leaders were generally powerless to deal with.

Lord Granville failed to realise in time the importance of the Angra Pequena question in 1883–1884, and he was forced, somewhat ignominiously, to yield to Bismarck over it. Finally, when Gladstone took up Home Rule for Ireland, Lord Granville, whose mind was similarly receptive to new ideas, adhered to his chief (1886), and gave way to Lord Rosebery when the latter was preferred to the foreign office; the Liberals had now realised that they had lost ground in the country by Lord Granville's occupancy of the post. He went into Colonial Office service for six months, and in July 1886 retired from public life.

== Family ==
Lord Granville married Lady Acton (Marie Louise Pelline de Dalberg), daughter of the Duke of Dalberg, Emmerich Joseph de Dalberg (a famous diplomat), widow of Sir Ferdinand Dalberg-Acton, Bt and mother of the historian Lord Acton, in 1840. She died in 1860.

Photograph of Marie Louise Pelline von Dalberg (1813–1860)

He was engaged in 1864 to an envoy and former spy from the Confederate States of America, Rose O'Neal Greenhow; but shortly thereafter, in returning to the Confederacy, she drowned off Wilmington, North Carolina, when her rowboat overturned as she was escaping a US blockade ship.

He married, as his second wife, Castilia Rosalind Campbell (or Castalia), daughter of Walter Frederick Campbell, on 26 September 1865; their children were:

- Lady Victoria Alberta Leveson-Gower (14 April 1867 – 11 February 1953), married Harold Russell (son of Lord Arthur John Edward Russell) on 8 September 1896. They had three children:
  - Elizabeth Frances Russell (6 July 1899 – 1986)
  - Rachel Georgiana Russell (28 January 1903 – 1 December 1995)
  - Anthony Arthur Russell (2 October 1904 – 7 April 1978)
- Lady Sophia Castelia Mary Leveson-Gower (25 February 1870 – 22 March 1934), married Hugh Morrison on 16 August 1892. They had two children:
  - John Granville Morrison, 1st Baron Margadale (16 December 1906 – 26 May 1996), married The Honorable Margaret Smith on 16 October 1928. They had four children.
  - Marjorie Morrison (15 December 1910 – 1992), married Lt.-Col. Scrope Egerton on 16 January 1933. They had one daughter:
    - Susan Alexandra Egerton (born 1936)
- Granville Leveson-Gower, 3rd Earl Granville (4 March 1872 – 21 July 1939), married Nina Baring (daughter of Walter Baring) on 27 September 1900.
- Lady Susan Katherine Leveson-Gower (21 August 1876 – 7 May 1878)
- Vice-Admiral William Spencer Leveson-Gower, 4th Earl Granville (11 July 1880 – 25 June 1953), married Lady Rose Bowes-Lyon on 24 May 1916. They had two children.

== Death ==
Granville died in London on 31 March 1891 and was succeeded in his peerages by his elder son, who became the 3rd Earl. He was buried in the family vault in the churchyard of St Michael and St Wulfad, Stone, Staffordshire.

== Legacy ==
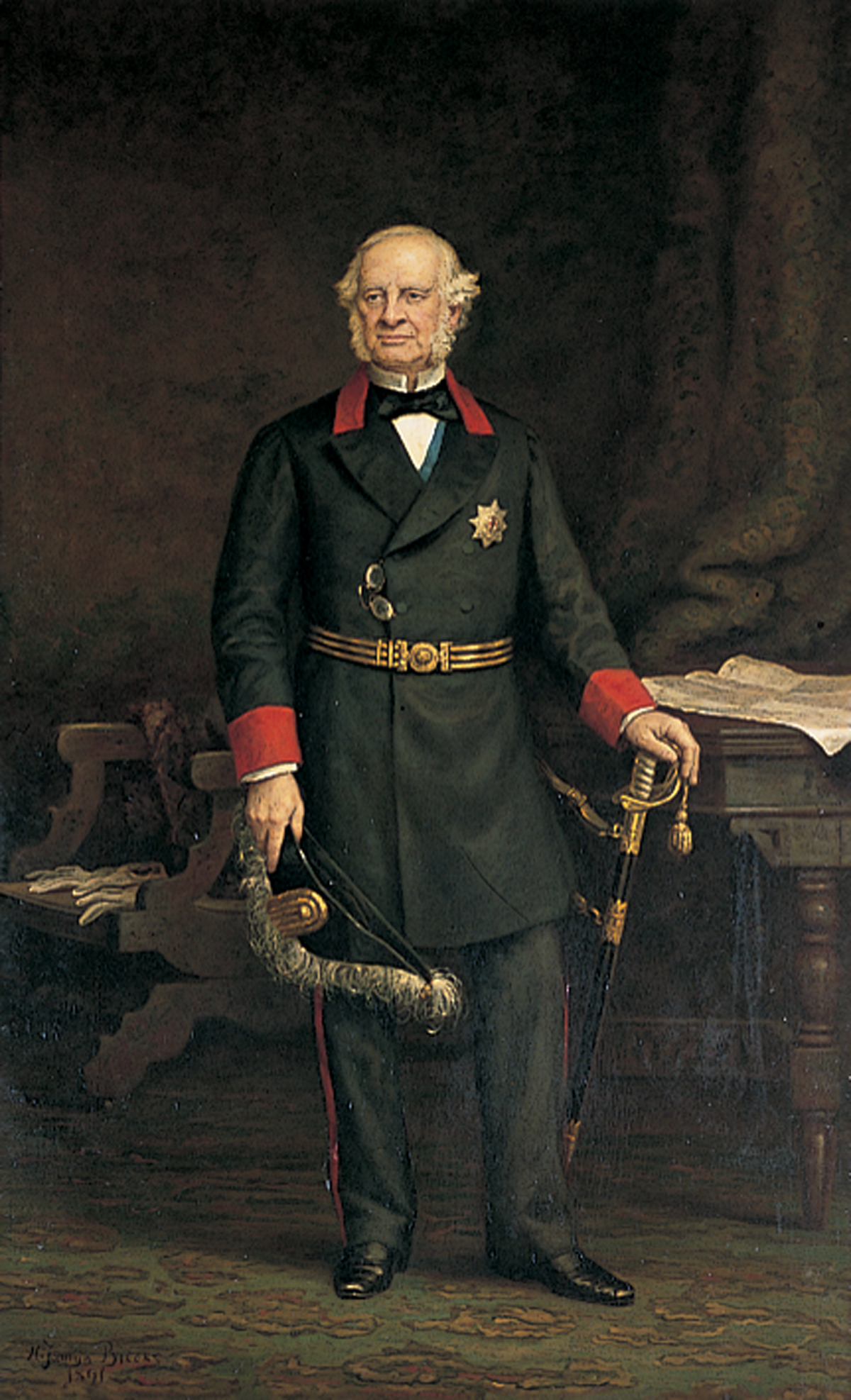
Earl Granville (1815–1891), Lord Warden of the Cinque Ports by Henry Jamyn Brooks (1891)

- Granville was the name of the present Canadian city of Vancouver from 1870 until its incorporation in 1886. Granville Street is a major north–south thoroughfare in the city.
- Granville house at Epsom College was named in his honour.
- Granville is also the name of a suburb and train station in Sydney. It was named in 1880.
- Granville Road, Granville Square and Granville Circuit in Hong Kong are named after him.
- The Granville Hotel, Ramsgate, (designed by Edward Welby Pugin) was named after him

== See also ==
- Timeline of British diplomatic history

== Bibliography ==
- Cecil, Algernon. British Foreign Secretaries 1807-1916 (1927) pp 255–273. online
- Chamberlain, Muriel E. "Gower, Granville George Leveson-, second Earl Granville (1815–1891)", Oxford Dictionary of National Biography, Oxford University Press, 2004; online edn, Jan 2008 accessed 20 Feb 2012
- Petty-Fitzmaurice, Edmond George. The life of Granville George Leveson Gower: second earl Granville (2 vol 1905) full text online
- Shannon, Richard (1999). Gladstone. Vol. II, 1865–1898. Chapel Hill: University of North Carolina Press. ISBN 978-0-8078-2486-3. OCLC 9971485.
- The Gladstone-Granville Correspondence ed. by Agatha Ramm, (2 vol, 1952, 1962)
- Temperley, Harold and L.M. Penson, eds. Foundations of British Foreign Policy: From Pitt (1792) to Salisbury (1902) (1938), primary sources online
- Capt P.C.G. Webster, The Records of the Queen's Own Royal Regiment of Staffordshire Yeomanry, Lichfield: Lomax, 1870.

Attribution:

Parliament of the United Kingdom
Preceded by Edward Howard	Member of Parliament for Morpeth; 1837–1840	Succeeded by Edward Howard
Preceded by Sir George Anson; Lord Alfred Paget	Member of Parliament for Lichfield; 1841–1846; With: Lord Alfred Paget	Succeeded by Hon. Edward Lloyd-Mostyn; Lord Alfred Paget
Political offices
Preceded by Hon. William Fox-Strangways	Under-Secretary of State for Foreign Affairs; 1840–1841	Succeeded by The Viscount Canning
Preceded by The Earl of Rosslyn	Master of the Buckhounds; 1846	Succeeded by The Earl of Bessborough
Preceded by Thomas Babington Macaulay	Paymaster General; 1848–1852	Succeeded by The Lord Stanley of Alderley
Preceded by Sir George Clerk, Bt	Vice-President of the Board of Trade; 1848–1852	Succeeded by The Lord Stanley of Alderley
Preceded by The Viscount Palmerston	Foreign Secretary; 1851–1852	Succeeded by The Earl of Malmesbury
Preceded by The Earl of Lonsdale	Lord President of the Council; 1852–1854	Succeeded by Lord John Russell
Preceded by Edward Strutt	Chancellor of the Duchy of Lancaster; 1854–1855	Succeeded by The Earl of Harrowby
Preceded by Lord John Russell	Lord President of the Council; 1855–1858	Succeeded by The 2nd Marquess of Salisbury
Preceded by The Earl of Aberdeen	Leader of the House of Lords; 1855–1858	Succeeded by The Earl of Derby
Preceded by The Earl of Derby	Leader of the House of Lords; 1859–1865	Succeeded by The Earl Russell
Preceded by The 2nd Marquess of Salisbury	Lord President of the Council; 1859–1866	Succeeded by The Duke of Buckingham and Chandos
Preceded by The Duke of Buckingham and Chandos	Secretary of State for the Colonies; 1868–1870	Succeeded by The Earl of Kimberley
Preceded by The Earl of Clarendon	Foreign Secretary; 1870–1874	Succeeded by The Earl of Derby
Preceded by The 3rd Marquess of Salisbury	Foreign Secretary; 1880–1885	Succeeded by The 3rd Marquess of Salisbury
Preceded by Sir Frederick Stanley	Secretary of State for the Colonies; 1886	Succeeded by Hon. Edward Stanhope
Academic offices
Preceded by The Earl of Burlington	Chancellor of the University of London; 1856–1891	Succeeded by The Earl of Derby
Party political offices
Preceded by The Marquess of Lansdowne	Leader of the Whigs in the House of Lords; 1855–1859	Party merged with Peelites, Radicals and Independent Irish Party to form British Liberal party
New political party	Leader of the Liberals in the House of Lords; 1859–1865	Succeeded by The Earl Russell
Preceded by The Earl Russell	Leader of the Liberals in the House of Lords; 1868–1891	Succeeded by The Earl of Kimberley
Preceded by William Ewart Gladstone	Leader of the British Liberal Party; 1875–1880 with Marquess of Hartington	Succeeded by William Ewart Gladstone
Honorary titles
Preceded by The Viscount Palmerston	Lord Warden of the Cinque Ports; 1865–1891	Succeeded by William Henry Smith
Peerage of the United Kingdom
Preceded by Granville Leveson-Gower	Earl Granville; 2nd creation 1846–1891	Succeeded by Granville Leveson-Gower
