= Leveson-Gower family =

British noble family

Original arms of the Leveson-Gower family: (Quarterly 1st & 4th barry of eight argent and gules a cross flory sable [Gower]; 2nd & 3rd: azure, three laurel leaves or [Leveson])

Leveson-Gower (/ˈluːsənˈɡɔːr/ LOOS-ən-GOR;), also Sutherland-Leveson-Gower, is the name of a historically prominent British noble family. Over time, several members of the Leveson-Gower family were made knights, baronets and peers. Hereditary titles held by the family include the dukedom of Sutherland, as well as the ancient earldom of Sutherland (created c. 1230) and the earldom of Granville (created 1833). Several other members of the family have also risen to prominence.

== Name ==
Leveson-Gower is a well-known example of an English surname with counterintuitive pronunciation.

The name Leveson is a patronymic from Louis or Lewis. In early modern times it was often rendered Luson: for example, in 1588, Elizabeth I received a letter from the King of Denmark concerning the depredations of Walter Leveson of Lilleshall Abbey, in which he is consistently referred to as Sir Walter Luson.

Gower is a locational name, possibly derived from a place so-named in Kent, or from the Gower Peninsula in southern Wales. It could also refer to one of the various towns named Gouy in northern France. The name of Gower Street, London is pronounced /ˈɡaʊər/ (rhyming with "power" rather than "pore") despite its being named after Gertrude Leveson-Gower by her husband, John Russell, 4th Duke of Bedford.

The double-barrelled Leveson-Gower was first adopted in 1668, when William Gower, second son of Sir Thomas Gower, 2nd Baronet, inherited the estates of his maternal great-uncle Sir Richard Leveson, and joined his surname to his own. The now William Leveson-Gower inherited the family baronetcy in 1689, and his male-line heirs became in turn Barons and then Earls Gower, Marquesses of Stafford, and Dukes of Sutherland (although since 1963 the senior surviving line has been a former cadet branch which adopted the surname Egerton in 1833; the most senior line still using the Leveson-Gower name are the Earls Granville).

The hyphen is used by only some members of the family.

== Titles in the family ==
- Gower baronetcy, of Sittenham (created 1620, a subsidiary title of the dukedom of Sutherland)
- Baron Gower (created 1703, a subsidiary title of the dukedom of Sutherland)
- Viscount Trentham (created 1746, a subsidiary title of the dukedom of Sutherland)
- Earl Gower (created 1746, a subsidiary title of the dukedom of Sutherland)
- Earl Granville (created 1833)
- Earl of Sutherland (created c. 1230, the premier earldom in the Peerage of Scotland)
- Marquess of Stafford (created 1786, a subsidiary title of the dukedom of Sutherland)
- Duke of Sutherland (created 1833, passed to the Egerton family in 1963 along with the dukedom's subsidiary titles)

== Other notable members ==
(All British)

- Frederick Neville Sutherland Leveson-Gower (1874–1959), politician
- H. D. G. Leveson Gower (1873–1954), English cricketer
- Frederick Leveson-Gower (1871–1946), English cricketer
- George Leveson-Gower (1858–1951), politician
- Lord Ronald Sutherland-Leveson-Gower (1845–1916), politician
- Granville Leveson-Gower, 1st Earl Granville (1773–1846), Whig statesman and diplomat
  - Granville Leveson-Gower, 2nd Earl Granville (1815–1891), Liberal politician and foreign minister
    - Granville Leveson-Gower, 3rd Earl Granville (1872–1939), diplomat
- John Leveson-Gower (1740–1792), Rear Admiral (Royal Navy) and politician
