= Rosie Stancer =

British explorer and polar adventurer (born 1960)

- Born: Rose Cecilia Clayton; 25 January 1960 (age 66)
- Education: Butterstone House School; Heathfield School, Ascot
- Occupation: Polar explorer
- Spouse: William Stancer (m. 1993)
- Children: 1
- Website: www.rosiestancer.com

Rose Cecilia "Rosie" Stancer (née Clayton; born 25 January 1960) is a British explorer and polar adventurer.

== Youth, education, family ==
Rosie Stancer attended Butterstone House School in Scotland and then Heathfield School, Ascot. She holds an honorary degree from the University of Essex. She is a Fellow of the Royal Geographical Society.

Stancer is the daughter of Lady Mary Cecilia Leveson-Gower (1917–2014) and Sir Samuel Clayton. Her maternal grandparents were Rose Leveson-Gower, Countess Granville (an elder sister of Queen Elizabeth the Queen Mother), and William Leveson-Gower, 4th Earl Granville, naval commander, making her a second cousin of King Charles III. Her paternal grandfather was Brigadier-General Sir Gilbert Falkingham Clayton, British Army intelligence officer and colonial administrator. Both her grandfathers died before she was born.

On 9 July 1993, she married William Wordie Stancer, with whom she has one son Jock Stancer. Her husband’s grandfather was, like Stancer herself, a polar explorer James Wordie. Her own grandfather, 4th Earl Granville, had polar ambitions too, but was deemed too tall.

== Expeditions ==
=== McVities All Women’s Penguin Polar Relay 1997 ===
In 1997, Stancer was one of 20 amateur women selected for a place on the first all women's expedition to the North Pole, The 'McVities Penguin Polar Relay'. A relay of five teams hauled sleds of up to 150 lbs across 500 miles (800 km) of shifting pack ice in temperatures down to minus 40 °C. After 73 days, the final relay group made it to the North Pole.

=== M&G ISA South Pole Expedition 1999 ===
In 1999, Stancer and four others from the first expedition organised and managed their own expedition to the South Pole, The 'M&G ISA Challenge'. Without guides, and with one re-supply, they completed the 700-mile (1,100 km) journey from the edge of Antarctica to the South Pole in 61 days. Meteorological data was gathered en route and submitted to the Omega Foundation.

=== Snickers South Pole Solo 2004 ===
In the Austral summer of 2003–4, Stancer skied solo and without re-supply to the South Pole on the 'Snickers South Pole Solo 2004' expedition. Hauling a sledge more than twice her body weight for over 700 miles (1,100 km), Stancer reached the Pole in 43 days 23 hours, a day longer than Fiona Thornewill who reached the South Pole a few days before Stancer. During the expedition Stancer gathered both meteorological and physiological data.

=== Mars North Pole Solo 2007 ===
In 2007, Stancer attempted to become the first woman to trek solo to the Geographic North Pole. She battled record weather conditions and had to self-amputate two of her frostbitten toes. At the final resupply with 89 nautical miles left, she made the difficult decision to stop the expedition because her pilots would not be able to pick her up at the North Pole. Having travelled 426 nautical miles in 84 days, Stancer was still able to set the world record for furthest solo female expedition to the north. This attempt might be a “World Last”.

=== The Long Haul Expedition 2019 ===
In 2019, Stancer joined Mike Laird on concurrent solo expeditions across Siberia’s Lake Baikal, the world’s largest, deepest, oldest freshwater lake. Pulling sledges and without resupply, they travelled solo across the ice using spikes and skis. They travelled in opposite directions, with Stancer starting from the south and Laird from the north. Their routes reached the most westerly, southerly, easterly, and northerly points of the lake, which had never been done before in one expedition. Completing over 700 km in 21 days, Stancer set the record. This expedition was carried out in support of the charity Veterans Aid.

=== Monarch's Way (2020) ===
Stancer walked the Monarch's Way in England in 2020.

=== Desert Trilogy (2020s) ===
In 2021 Stancer began a 'desert trilogy', travelling across the Aralkum in 2021 and the Sinai Peninsula in 2023; she travelled with Pom Oliver, Arabella Dorman and Lee Watts.

== Charities ==
Stancer is an honorary board member for the charity Special Olympics GB, which seeks to provide sports training and competition in a variety of Olympic-style events for people with learning disabilities.

== Awards ==
Stancer was awarded an honorary fellowship from the Polar exploration society. She also received the Mirror award and is an Honorary Advisor to the Scientific Exploration Society.

== Other links ==
- Official website
