= List of Pakistani Catholic technical institutes =

This is a list of Catholic technical institutes in Pakistan. It includes Catholic technical institutes which do not warrant independent articles of their own.

- Don Bosco Technical Institute, Lahore
- St. Joseph's Technical Institute, Faisalabad
- St. Patrick's Institute of Science & Technology, Karachi
- Sargodha Institute of Technology
