= Rose Leveson-Gower, Countess Granville =

British peeress (1890–1967)

The Right Honourable The Countess Granville GCVO GCStJ
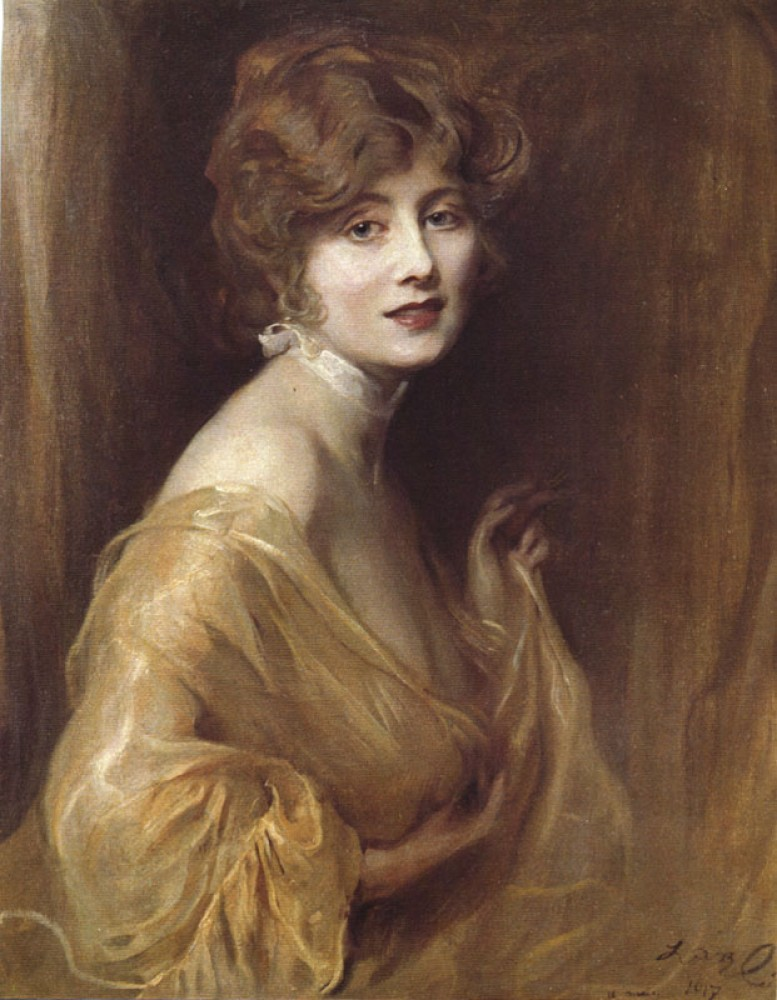
- Portrait by Philip de László, 1917
- Born: Rose Constance Bowes-Lyon; 6 May 1890
- Died: 17 November 1967 (aged 77)
- Spouse: William Leveson-Gower, 4th Earl Granville (m. 1916; died 1953)
- Children: 2
- Parents: Claude Bowes-Lyon, 14th Earl of Strathmore and Kinghorne (father); Cecilia Cavendish-Bentinck (mother)
- Relatives: Queen Elizabeth the Queen Mother (sister); Rosie Stancer (granddaughter)

Rose Constance Leveson-Gower, Countess Granville (née Bowes-Lyon; 6 May 1890 – 17 November 1967) was the third daughter of the 14th Earl of Strathmore and Kinghorne by his wife, Cecilia Cavendish-Bentinck. An elder sister of Queen Elizabeth the Queen Mother, she was therefore a maternal aunt of Queen Elizabeth II.

== Life and family ==
On 24 May 1916, Lady Rose Bowes-Lyon married The Hon. William Leveson-Gower, who succeeded to his childless brother's earldom on 21 July 1939. As a result, she was styled as Countess Granville. The couple had two children:

- Lady Mary Cecilia Leveson-Gower (12 December 1917 – 13 February 2014), who married Sir Samuel Clayton (8 January 1918 – February 2004) on 7 July 1956 and had issue. Their daughter is polar adventurer Rosie Stancer.
- Granville James Leveson-Gower, 5th Earl Granville (6 December 1918 – 31 October 1996), who married Doon Aileen Plunket (1931–2003) on 9 October 1958 and had issue.

The Countess Granville stood godmother to her niece, Princess Margaret Rose of York, at the latter's christening on 3 October 1930. She was invested as a Dame Grand Cross of the Most Venerable Order of the Hospital of St John of Jerusalem (GCStJ). She was also awarded the honorary degree of Doctor of Laws (LL.D.) by Queen's University Belfast. In 1953, she was invested as a Dame Grand Cross of the Royal Victorian Order (GCVO).

Lord Granville died on 25 June 1953, aged 72. Lady Granville outlived him by fourteen years when she died on 17 November 1967, aged 77. She was the last surviving sibling of Queen Elizabeth The Queen Mother.

== Ancestry ==
Ancestors of Rose Leveson-Gower, Countess Granville

8. Thomas George Lyon-Bowes, Lord Glamis
4. Claude Bowes-Lyon, 13th Earl of Strathmore and Kinghorne
9. Charlotte Grimstead
2. Claude Bowes-Lyon, 14th Earl of Strathmore and Kinghorne
10. Oswald Smith
5. Frances Dora Smith
11. Henrietta Mildred Hodgson
1. Rose Constance Bowes-Lyon
12. Lord Charles Bentinck
6. Charles William Frederick Cavendish-Bentinck
13. Anne Wellesley
3. Cecilia Cavendish-Bentinck
14. Edwyn Burnaby
7. Caroline Louisa Burnaby
15. Anne Caroline Salisbury
