= Poppitt =

Poppitt is a surname. Notable people with the surname include:

- Jimmy Poppitt (1875–1930), English footballer
- John Poppitt (1923–2014), English footballer
- Sally Poppitt (fl. 1988), New Zealand nutrition academic

== See also ==
- Poppet
