= Lilleshall =

Village and civil parish in Shropshire, England

Coordinates: 52°44′13″N 2°23′53″W

- Village and civil parish
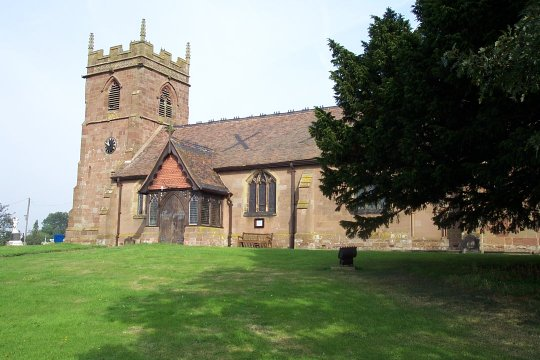
- St Michael and All Angels church

- Location within Shropshire
- OS grid reference: SJ731155
- Civil parish: Lilleshall
- Unitary authority: Telford and Wrekin
- Ceremonial county: Shropshire
- Region: West Midlands
- Country: England
- Sovereign state: United Kingdom
- Post town: NEWPORT
- Postcode district: TF10
- Dialling code: 01952
- Police: West Mercia
- Fire: Shropshire
- Ambulance: West Midlands
- UK Parliament: The Wrekin

Lilleshall is a village and civil parish in the Telford and Wrekin borough of Shropshire, England.

It lies between the towns of Telford and Newport, on the A518, in the Wrekin constituency. There is one school in the centre of the village.

The village dates back to Anglo-Saxon times, the parish church being founded by St Chad. It is mentioned in the Domesday Book. The Norman parish church of St Michael and All Angels is a grade I listed building.

== Local governance ==
A civil parish was formed on 1 April 2015 from Lilleshall, Donnington and Muxton, though a previous parish also called "Lilleshall" existed.

== Layout ==
There is a monument, a cricket club, a tennis club, a church and a primary school clustered around a bracken-covered hill named Lilleshall Hill.

== Lilleshall Abbey ==
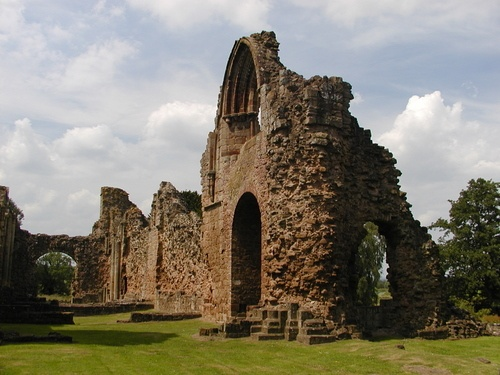
Remains of Lilleshall Abbey

Lilleshall Abbey, some distance to the east of the village, was an Augustinian house, founded in the twelfth century, the ruins of which are protected by English Heritage. After the dissolution of the monasteries the estate was bought by the Wolverhampton wool merchant James Leveson. His family held the site for four generations and, after two owners died without issue, it passed into the hands of the related Leveson-Gower family in the late 17th century.

== Industry ==
Lilleshall is surrounded by farmland. The village and surrounds were the site of considerable early industrial development from as early as the 16th century, when Walter Leveson (1551-1602) established a bloomery. In the eighteenth and nineteenth centuries relatively shallow deposits of coal and limestone were mined, with resultant subsidence. The history of the mining of limestone is reflected in the naming of a road called 'Limekiln Lane' in Lilleshall. The former limestone mines are tucked away in treeland at the Newport end of the village, locally known as "the Slang", which is effectively several pits now filled with water, popular with local fishermen and unpopular with local parents of young children - the water is deep and the former minepits area quite dark, abandoned and dangerous.

At a similar time to the mining of limestone an early example of the English canal network was dug, the Donnington Wood Canal and its Lilleshall branch which were connected by an inclined plane, reflected in the naming of a road named The Incline in Lilleshall.

== Lilleshall Hall ==
The Leveson-Gower Dukes of Sutherland became one of the richest families in the United Kingdom partly as a result of this industrial development and in the late nineteenth century built a new residence, Lilleshall Hall which lies at the heart of the estate a mile from the village. The Sutherland estate was sold off between 1915 and 1917 and the hall eventually passed into state ownership as a sporting facility. It is now the Lilleshall Hall National Sports Centre, once the site of the Football Association youth academy, and now the home of British gymnastics and archery. Lilleshall Hall Golf Club is also in the grounds of Lilleshall Hall.

== Lilleshall Monument/Sutherland Monument ==
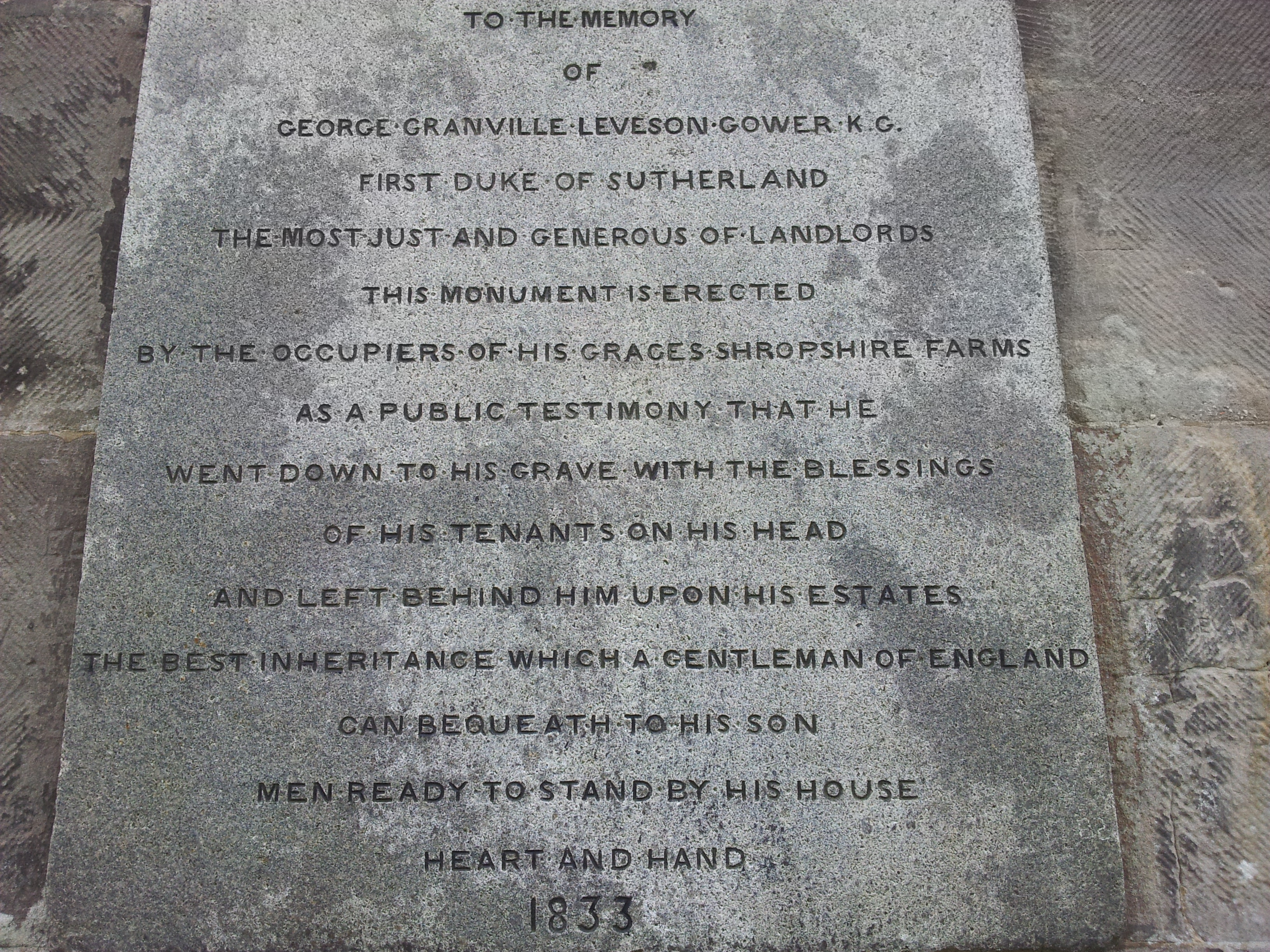
Inscription on monument

The Lilleshall Monument is a 70-foot (21 m) high obelisk, a local landmark which stands on top of Lilleshall Hill and was erected in honour of the 1st Duke of Sutherland.

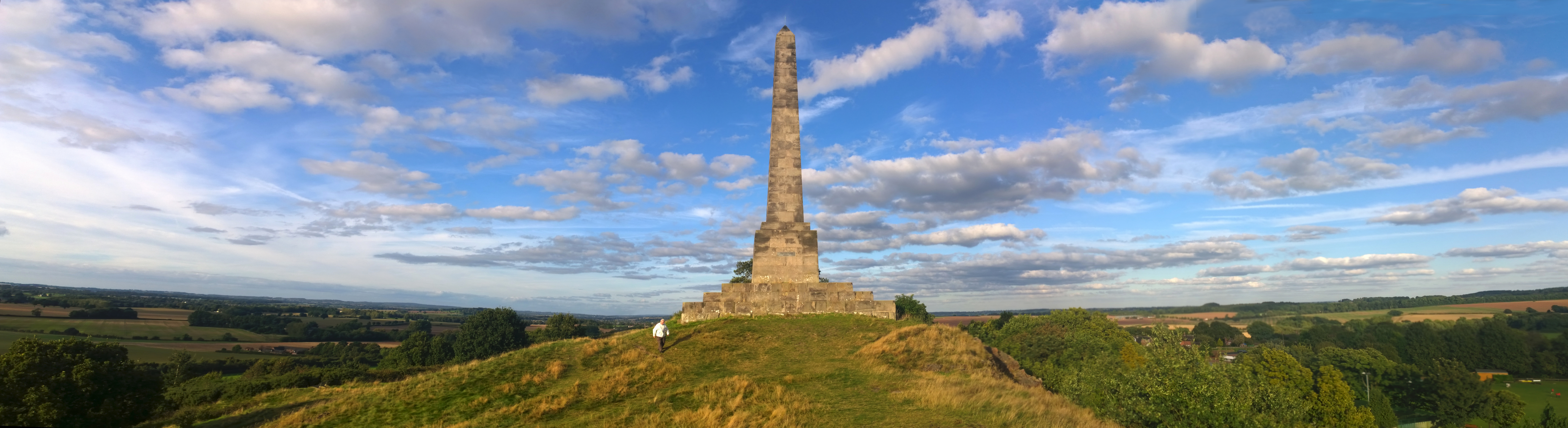
Sutherland Monument

== Notable residents ==
- John Mirk (active c.1380–1420), English liturgical writer, was a Canon at Lilleshall Abbey.
- Walter Leveson (1550–1602), politician, and his son Vice-Admiral Richard Leveson (c.1570-1605) lived in a lodge in grounds of the dissolved Lilleshall Abbey.
- Samuel Marsden (1832-1912), clergyman, later Anglican Bishop of Bathurst, Australia, was resident curate at Donnington 1858-1861.
- Jimmy Poppitt (1875–1930), footballer who played for Lincoln City, Notts County and Wolverhampton Wanderers, was born in Lilleshall.
- Lionel Blaxland (1898–1976), cricketer who played for Derbyshire.

== See also ==
- Listed buildings in Lilleshall and Donnington
