= Susan Jebb =

British nutritionist

Susan Jebb OBE
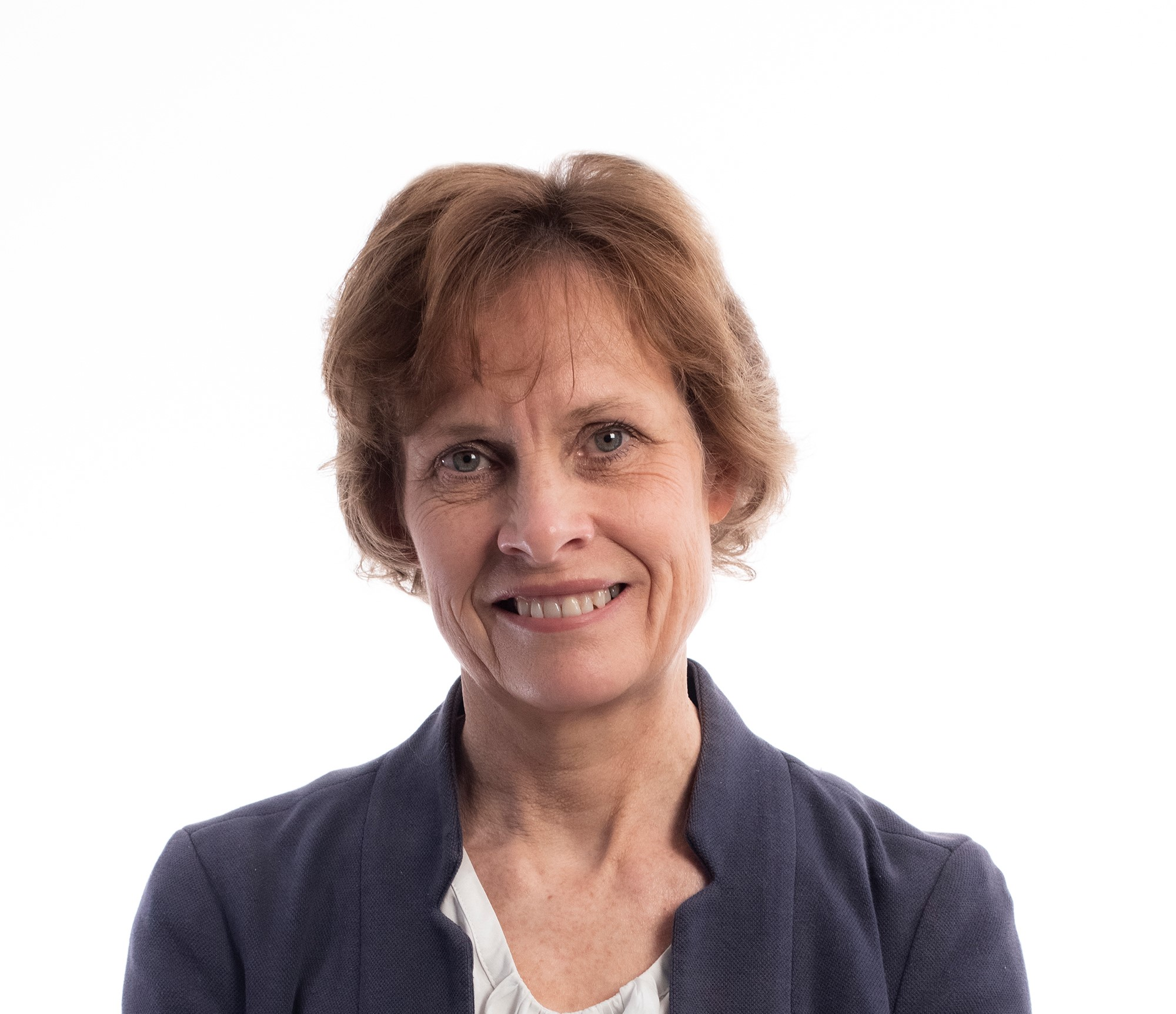
- Government portrait, 2021
- Born: 29 August 1964 (age 62)
- Education: University of Surrey (BA); University of Cambridge (PhD)
- Scientific career
- Workplaces: University of Oxford; Food Standards Agency
- Website: phc.ox.ac.uk/team/susan-jebb

Susan Ann Jebb OBE (born 24 August 1964) is Chair of the United Kingdom's Food Standards Agency and Professor of Diet and Population Health at the Nuffield Department of Primary Care Health Sciences, University of Oxford. She is also a senior research fellow at Jesus College.

== Education ==
She is the eldest daughter of Roy Parkinson of Cheadle Hulme.

Jebb earned her undergraduate degree in nutrition from the University of Surrey in 1986, qualifying as a state registered dietitian before completing a PhD at the University of Cambridge in 1990, which investigated methods of measuring body composition.

== Career ==
At the Dunn Clinical Nutrition Centre in the early 1990s, she worked with Sally Poppitt, where she became head of obesity research She took up her current professorship at Oxford in 2013. In 1997 she said 'alcohol in moderation can be good for you, but it must be in moderation'. In 2015, she was criticised in an investigation by the British Medical Journal for her closeness to the sugar industry.

Jebb's research has suggested that a referral to commercial weight management weight loss programmes delivered in the community may be a cost-effective way to treat obesity in primary care. Her more recent work has studied how our perception of portion size as normal or smaller than normal can affect the amount of food we eat, and how shoppers can be influenced to choose decreased salt alternatives at the grocery store.

Jebb is a member of The Times Health Commission. In January 2023, her comments were the subject of some media attention after she appeared to compare bringing cake into the workplace to passive smoking.

== Personal life ==
When at Cambridge, she lived in Steeple Morden, near Royston, Hertfordshire and later in Great Shelford; she now lives in Shropshire.

Her husband is the son of Lionel Jebb and Corinna Hawkesworth, with sister Sophie and brother Andrew. Her husband, born in 1961, grew up at Dudleston Grange in Shropshire.

Her husband's mother was the daughter of a Shrewsbury School teacher, and her husband's father attended Shrewsbury School. Her husband's father was High Sheriff of Shropshire from 1991-92, and Chairman of the Governors of Adcote School in the 1990s. Her husband is a relative of novelist Minette Walters.

== Awards and honors ==
Early on in her career, Susan Jebb was awarded the ASO's (the association for the study of obesity) and EASO 's (European association for the study of obesity) 'Young Investigator' award.

In 2008, she was awarded an OBE for services to public health. Susan Jebb has won the international 2015 John Maddox Prize for courage in promoting science and evidence on a matter of public interest. In 2018, she was appointed Fellow of the Medical Academy of Sciences.

== Selected publications ==
- Çoker, Elif Naz.; Jebb, Susan A. (August 2024). "Testing the effect of a dynamic descriptive social norm message on meat-free food selection in worksite cafeterias: a randomized controlled trial". Appetite. 199. doi:10.1016/j.appet.2024.107453. PMID 107453.
