= Eric Sutherland, 4th Lord Duffus =

Eric Sutherland (died 1768) was the 4th Lord Duffus, member of the Scottish nobility and a cadet of the Clan Sutherland.

== Early life ==
He was the eldest son of Kenneth Sutherland, 3rd Lord Duffus and his wife Charlotta Christina, daughter of Eric Sioblade, governor of Gothenburg.

== Lord of Duffus ==
Eric Sutherland was baptized on 10 August 1710 and was the titular 4th Lord Duffus. In 1734, after his father had died, he presented a petition to George II of Great Britain explaining how his father had been detained in Hamburg which meant that he had been unable to surrender on-time during the Jacobite rising of 1715 and thus disputed his father's attainder. The House of Lords decided against this claim and declared that he had no right to the title. However, letters from him and his wife show that he assumed the title and that this was accepted by his neighbors.

He was apparently an ensign in Colonel Disney's Regiment in 1731. During the Jacobite rising of 1745 he remained loyal to the Crown and gave intelligence of the rebels to the Earl of Sutherland. According to James Balfour Paul, he did not take part in any military operations. According to William Fraser, he was a captain in the Earl of Sutherland's regiment. James Balfour Paul stated that Eric Sutherland's relations with the Earl of Sutherland's family were extremely friendly.

He died on 28 August 1768. It is said that he died at Skibo but it is more likely to have been at Skelbo, where he had a house.

== Family ==
Eric Sutherland, 4th Lord Duffus married his cousin in the male line Elizabeth, daughter of Sir James Dunbar of Hempriggs, who had changed his surname from Sutherland to Dunbar after marrying into the Dunbar family. Their children were:

1. James Sutherland, 5th Lord Duffus (1747-1827), heir and successor. His title was restored by an Act of Parliament in 1826. He was succeeded by his 2nd cousin in the male line who had the surname Dunbar, the surname having been changed from Sutherland as mentioned above.
2. Axel or Axley Sutherland.
3. Elizabeth Sutherland, who married firstly, Captain Alexander Sinclair, son of Sir William Sinclair of Keiss and had issue, and secondly, to Charles Sinclair of Olrig and had issue.
4. Charlotte Sutherland, who married Sir John Sinclair of Mey, with whom she had issue: James Sinclair, 12th Earl of Caithness.
5. Anne Sutherland, who married George Mackay of Skibo, and had issue.
