= William Sutherland, 17th Earl of Sutherland =

18th-century Scottish politician

William Sutherland, 17th Earl of Sutherland, previously named William Gordon, 17th Earl of Sutherland, (2 October 1708 – 1750), was a Scottish politician who sat in the House of Commons from 1727 until 1733 when he succeeded to the peerage as Earl of Sutherland. He was chief of the Clan Sutherland, a Scottish clan of the Scottish Highlands.

== Early life ==
Sutherland was born as William Gordon, the eldest surviving son of William Gordon, Lord Strathnaver and his wife Catherine Morrison, daughter of William Morrison, MP, of Preston-grange, Haddington. His father died in 1720 and he succeeded his elder brother on 12 December 1720. He undertook a grand tour in France and Hanover from 1726 to 1727.

At the 1727 British general election Sutherland was put up by his grandfather for the constituency of Sutherland at the age of 18. There existed a resolution that the eldest sons of peers of Scotland should not sit in the House of Commons and his grandfather expressed the hope to the Duke of Argyll that this would not be invoked because Sutherland was a grandson, and not a son. He was returned as Member of Parliament without difficulty. In 1730 he claimed repayment for arms surrendered to the Government, under the Act for disarming the Highlands, but his claim was deferred because some of his receipts for arms appeared very suspicious. He voted with the Administration on the Hessians in 1730 and on the Excise Bill in 1733. When he succeeded his grandfather John Gordon, 16th Earl of Sutherland as 17th Earl of Sutherland on 27 June 1733, he was said to have made a deal with Walpole and Ilay by which, he would vote for the court list of representative peers, provided he was made one of them himself, which transpired in 1734. He was also appointed a lord of police in Scotland at £800 p.a., and granted a pension of £1,200 p.a He vacated his seat in the House of Commons. In 1744, he was promoted to be first lord of police.

== Jacobite rising of 1745 ==
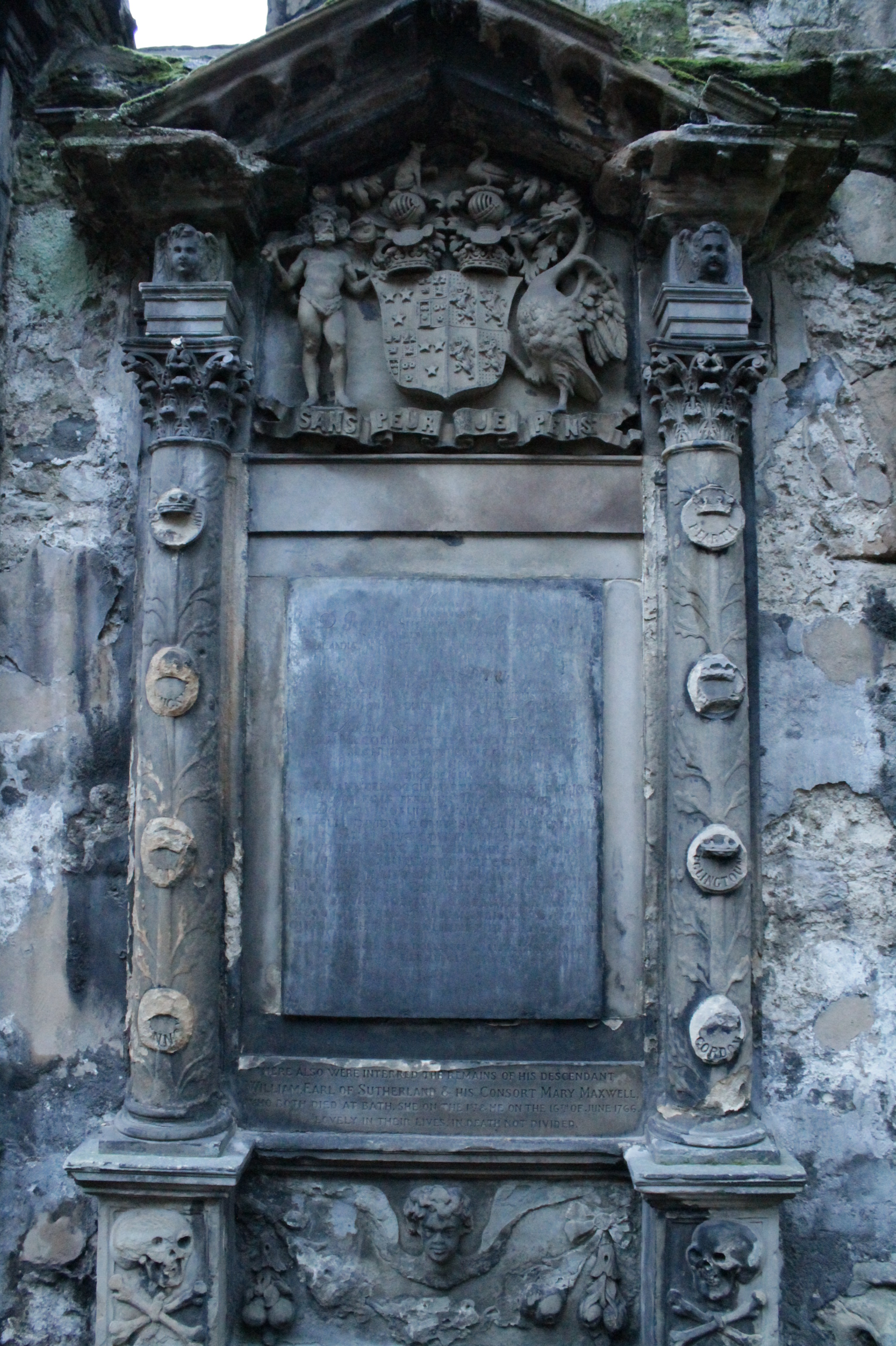
The grave of George, 15th Earl of Sutherland, Holyrood Abbey

During the Jacobite rising of 1745, Sutherland supported the British-Hanoverian Government and raised two independent companies on behalf of the Government. At one stage, the Jacobites stormed the Earl's home at Dunrobin Castle, but he narrowly escaped them through a back door and sailed to join the army of Prince William, Duke of Cumberland. One day before the Battle of Culloden an Independent Highland Company of soldiers that were raised from the Clan Sutherland by the Earl of Sutherland, took part in the Battle of Littleferry in support of the Government where the Jacobites were defeated. He was also present at the Battle of Culloden where the Jacobites were finally defeated. Despite this, some people in the Government were unhappy with the Earl's strength of support and he struggled to prove to the parliament in London that he had not had Jacobite sympathies.

During the Jacobite rising of 1745, Eric Sutherland, 4th Lord Duffus remained loyal to the Crown and gave intelligence of the rebels to the Earl of Sutherland. According to James Balfour Paul, he did not take part in any military operations. According to William Fraser, he was a captain in the Earl of Sutherland's regiment. James Balfour Paul stated that Eric Sutherland's relations with the Earl of Sutherland's family were extremely friendly.

== Later life ==
Sutherland joined the party of Frederick, Prince of Wales, and as a result, lost his police post in 1747. He wrote to the Duke of Newcastle on 30 July 1747, complaining of the loss of his post and seeking recompense for his expenditure during the Jacobite rising. He waited around court for two years, leaving his mother in charge of the management of his estates in Scotland and then decided to go abroad.

Sutherland died at Montauban in France on 7 December 1750, leaving debts of £15,797, and was buried in the grave of his great-grandfather, Gordon, the 15th Earl, in Holyrood Abbey in Edinburgh.

== Family ==
Sutherland married Elizabeth Wemyss, daughter of David Wemyss, 3rd Earl of Wemyss in a marriage contract signed on 17 April 1734. They had the following children:

1. William Sutherland, 18th Earl of Sutherland (1735 - 1766)
2. Elizabeth Gordon (d.1803)

Parliament of Great Britain
Preceded by Sir William Gordon	Member of Parliament for Sutherland; 1727–1733	Succeeded by Sir James Fergusson
Peerage of Scotland
Preceded by John Gordon	Earl of Sutherland; 1733–1750	Succeeded by William Sutherland
