= Kenneth Sutherland, 3rd Lord Duffus =

Scottish noble (died 1733)

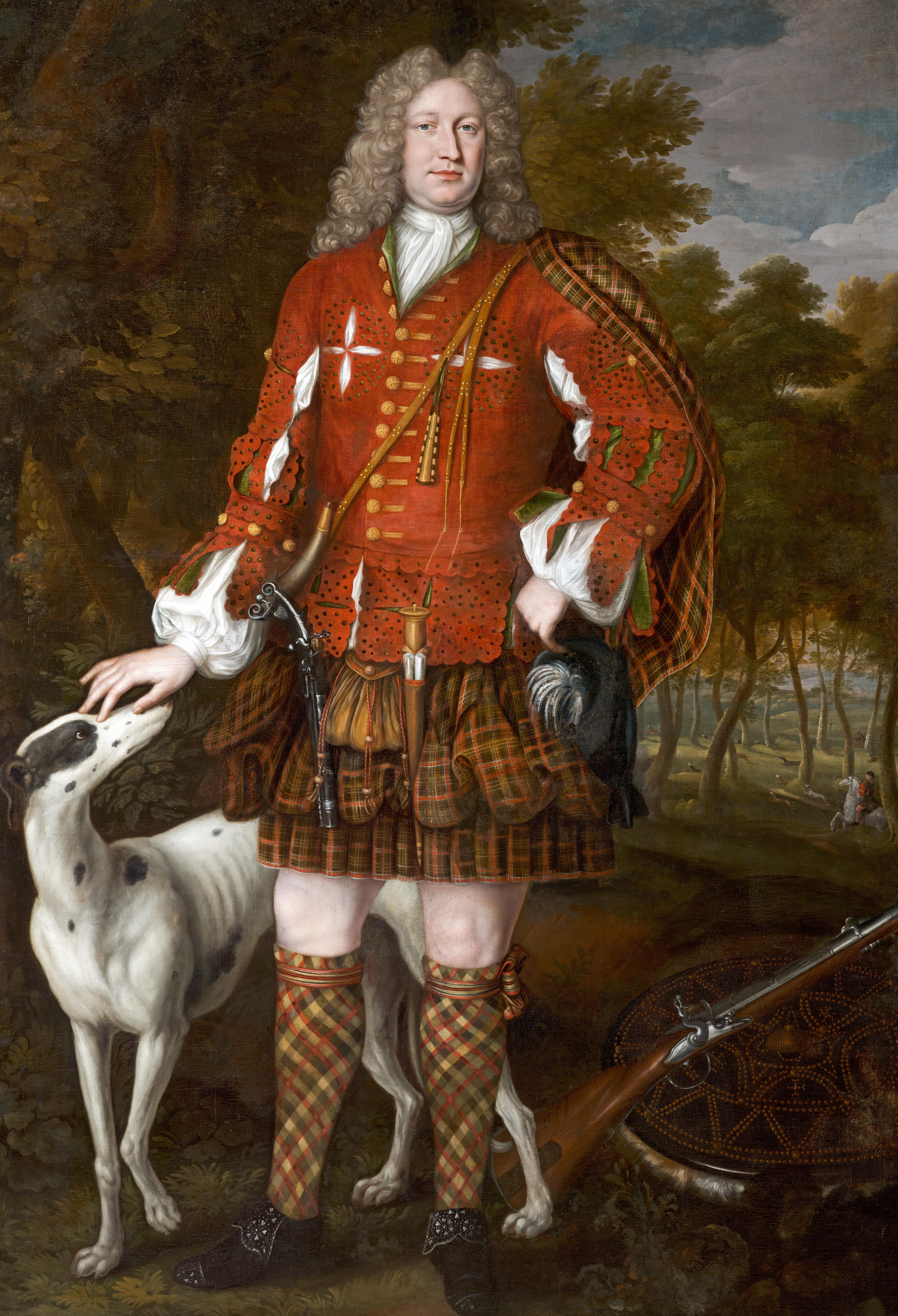
Kenneth Lord Duffus, in Highland dress c. 1712; portrait by Richard Waitt

Kenneth Sutherland (died 1733–34) was the 3rd Lord Duffus, member of the Scottish nobility and a cadet of the Clan Sutherland.

== Early life ==
He was the eldest son of James Sutherland, 2nd Lord Duffus and Margaret, eldest daughter of Kenneth Mackenzie, 3rd Earl of Seaforth.

== Lord Duffus ==
He succeeded upon his father's death in 1705, but at the time was on service in the West Indies for the Crown during Queen Anne's War where he served as a captain in her Royal Navy. On 29 June 1711, with his own ship alone, which was a frigate with forty-six guns, he engaged eight French privateers, but after a desperate resistance he was taken prisoner having received five bullet wounds.

Although he had voted for the Acts of Union 1707, he still supported the Jacobites during the Jacobite rising of 1715. During the rising, he marched at the head of 500 men from the Clan Mackenzie, Clan Chisholm and Clan MacDonald to Tain where he proclaimed James VIII. He also attempted to make the Lairds of Culloden and Kilravock surrender their houses and arms, but without success. His estates were then forfeited and he fled abroad, apparently via Caithness and then onto Sweden. While he was there he learned that he was being searched for and prepared to surrender, declaring this intention to the British minister at Stockholm, who in turn notified the English Secretary of State. However, when he was on his way to England he was seized by order of the British resident at Hamburg and confined until the time for surrender had passed. He was then conveyed as a prisoner from Hamburg to the Tower of London but was freed without trial in 1717.

He later entered into service with the Russian Navy. He died before 18 March 1733–34.

== Family ==
He married, by contract dated 30 March 1708, Charlotta Christina, daughter of Eric Sioblade, governor of Gothenburg. Their children were:

1. Eric Sutherland, 4th Lord Duffus, heir and successor.
2. Charlotte Regina Sutherland (of Sutherland of Duffus), born 30 October 1711 London, England, died 2 March 1802 Rabbelugn manor, Elimäki-Anjala, Kymenlaakso, Finland. Named as one her mother's executors in 1778. Inherited from her mother the Fågelsta manor in Sweden that she exchanged with her brother-in-law the Baron Wrede, acquiring a share of manors in Elimäki as replacement. Founded an elementary school, so-called Regina School, in her husband's domain of Anjala in Kymenlaakso of Finland, the school being one of the first in Finland for educating local children irrespective of social class. Her husband is baron Otto Kustavi Wrede, one of members of The Swedish House of Lords.
3. Anna Sutherland, who married to Baron and Royal Court Marshal Gustaf Adolph Palbitzki, of Alvastra, nobleman of Sweden. She was also named as one of her mother's executors in 1778.

Peerage of Scotland
Preceded by James Sutherland	Lord Duffus; 1704–1734	Succeeded by Eric Sutherland
