= Richard Waitt =

Scottish painter

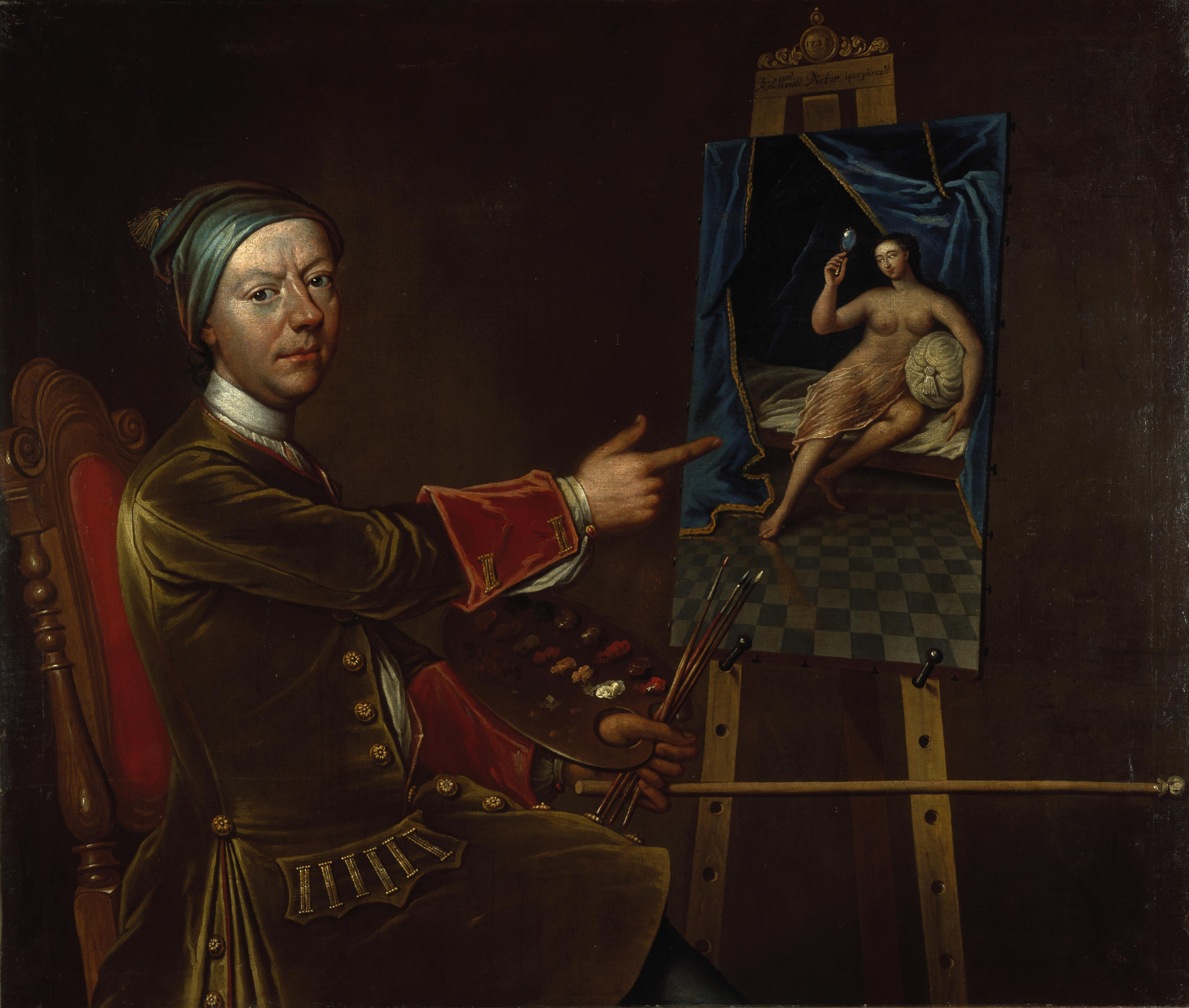
Richard Waitt self-portrait, 1731, National Galleries Scotland

Richard Waitt (24 January 1684 - 1732) was a Scottish painter.

== Life ==
His parents were Thomas Waitt (born c. 1665) from Scotland; and Marie Birrell (born c. 1670) from Scotland.

Richard Waitt was born on 24 January 1684 in Canongate, Edinburgh.

He married Margaret Friebairn on 24 April 1707 in Edinburgh.

== Art ==
Waitt was taught by John Scougal, and started out as a decorative painter focusing mainly on still lifes. However, later he painted primarily portraits, and for many years worked almost exclusively with the Clan Grant. He was active from c. 1708 and died in 1732.

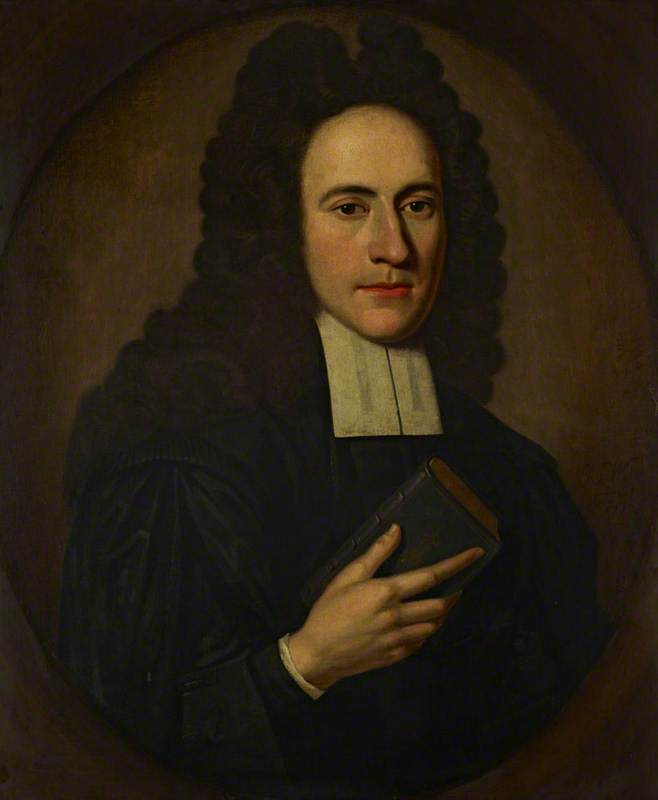
Rev. Ralph Erskine, painted 1712

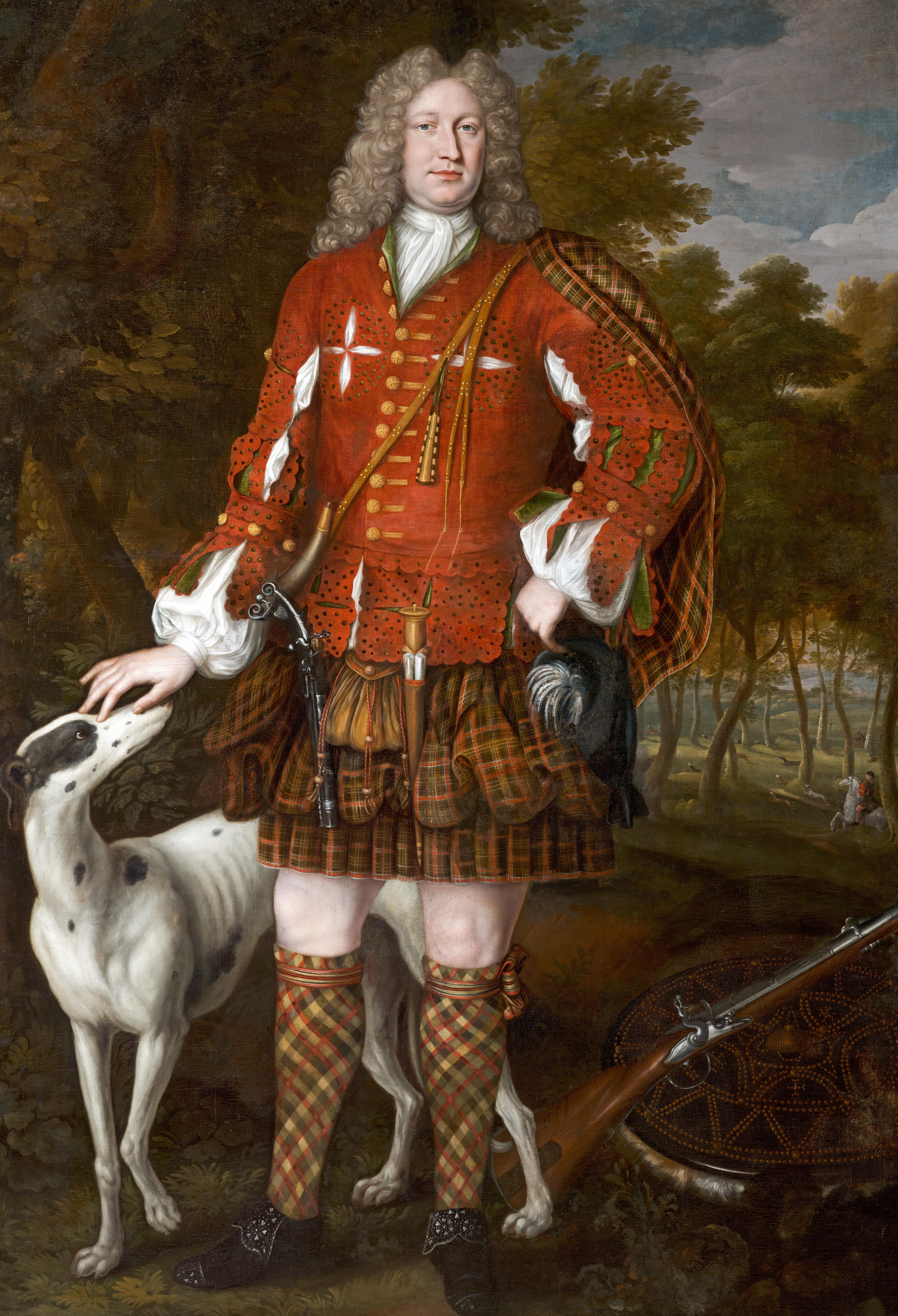
Kenneth Sutherland, 3rd Lord Duffus, painted c. 1712

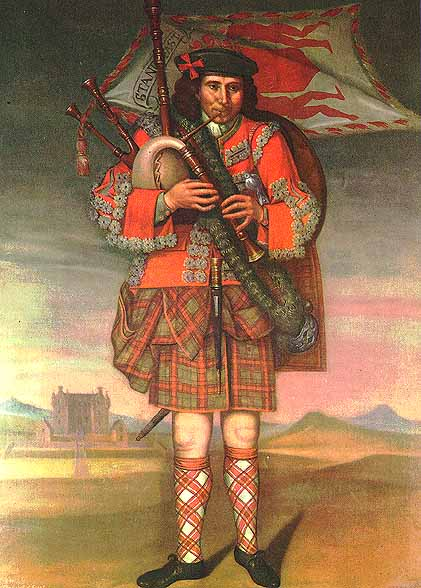
William Cummimg, Clan Grant piper, painted 1714

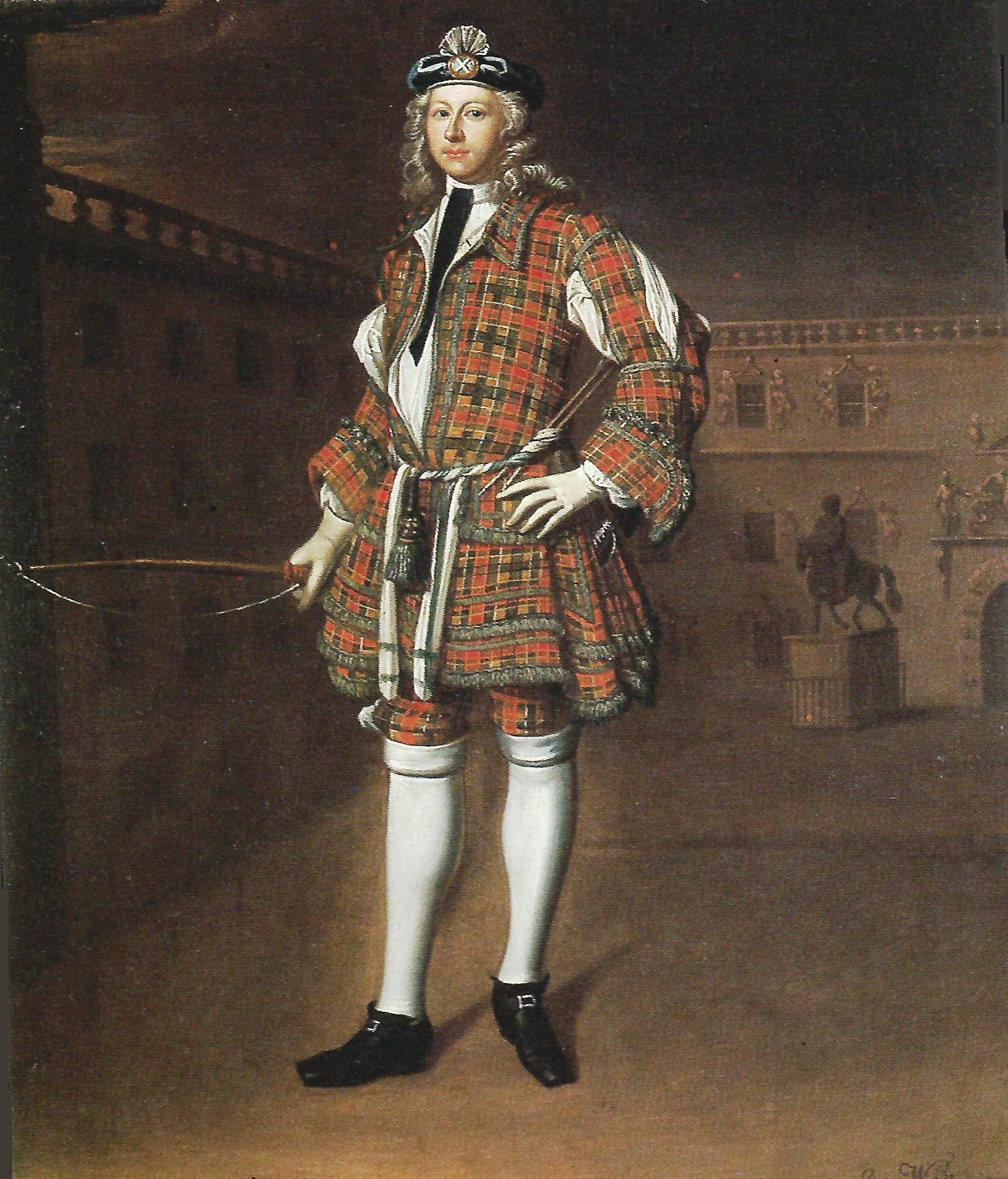
Young Archibald Grant of Monymusk in Royal Company of Archers uniform, painted 1715

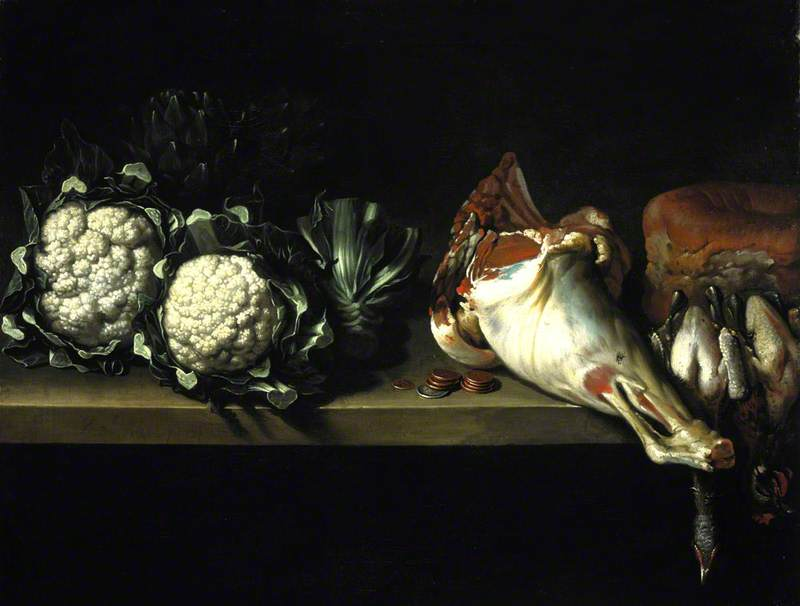
Still life, painted 1724

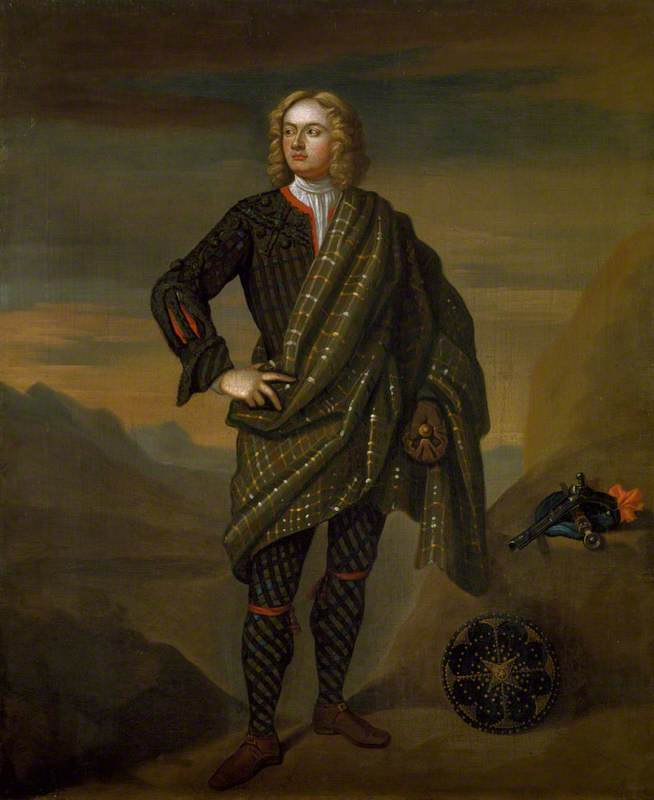
Andrew Macpherson of Cluny, 15th Chief, painted c. 1725

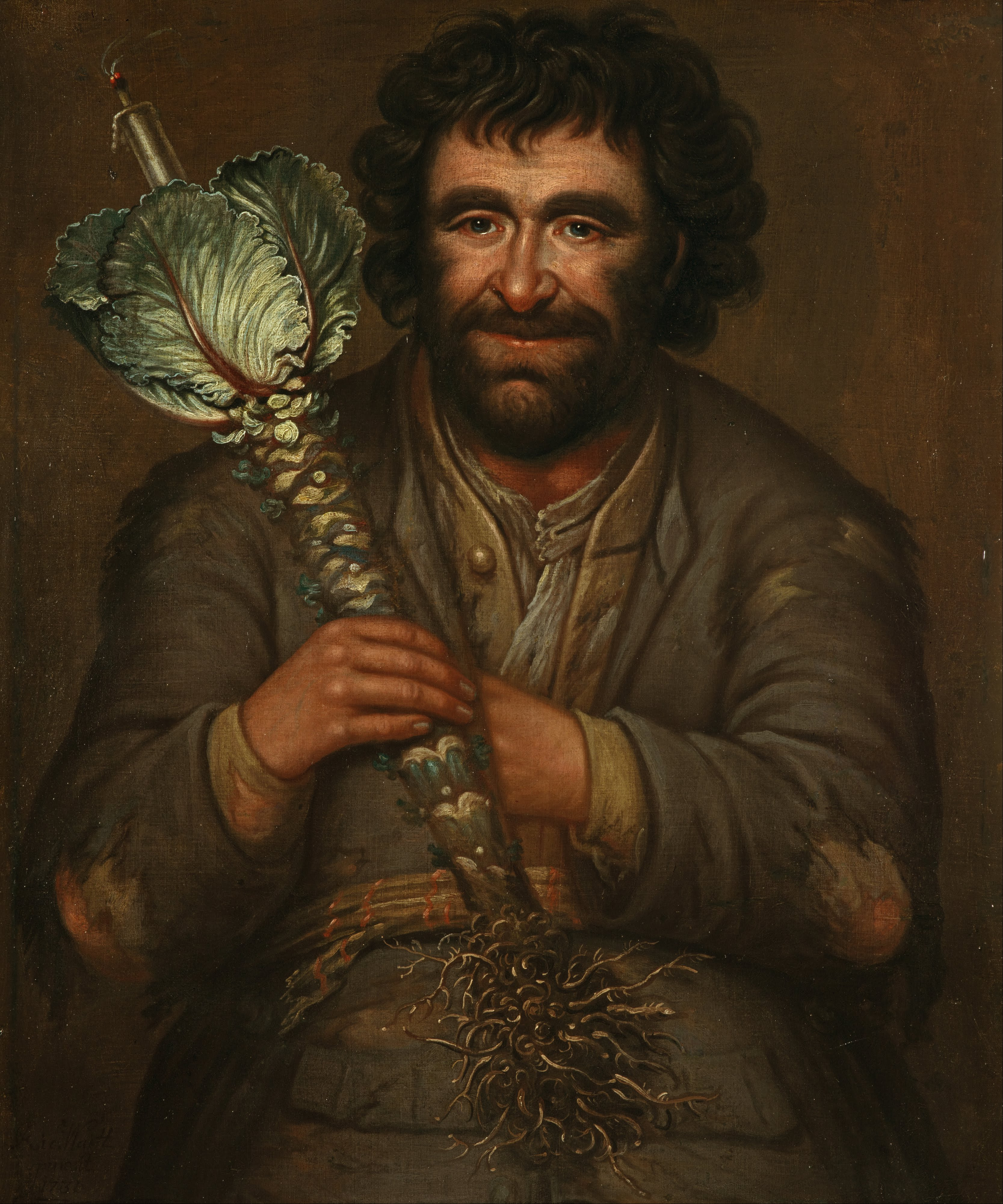
The Cromartie Fool, painted 1731
