= Charlotte Fitzalan-Howard, Duchess of Norfolk =

British noblewoman (1788–1870)

Her Grace The Duchess of Norfolk
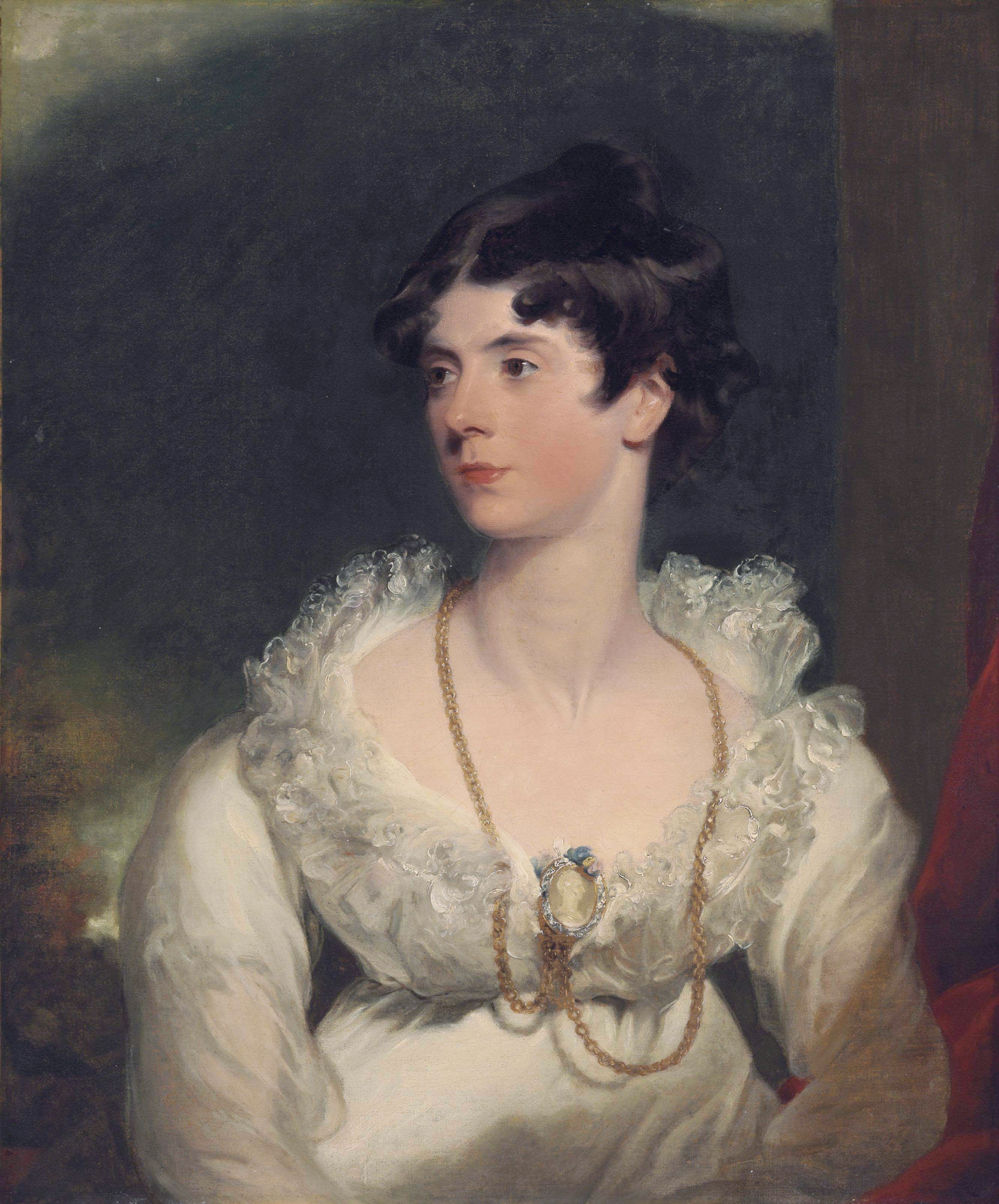
- Charlotte Sophia (1788-1870). (studio of Thomas Lawrence)
- Born: Charlotte Sophia Leveson-Gower; 1788
- Died: 7 July 1870 (aged 81–82)
- Noble family: Leveson-Gower (by birth); Howard (by marriage)
- Spouse: Henry Howard, 13th Duke of Norfolk (m. 1814; died 1856)
- Issue: Henry Fitzalan-Howard, 14th Duke of Norfolk; Edward Fitzalan-Howard, 1st Baron Howard of Glossop; Lady Mary Charlotte Howard; Lord Bernard Thomas Fitzalan-Howard; Lady Adeliza Matilda Fitzalan-Howard
- Father: George Leveson-Gower, 1st Duke of Sutherland
- Mother: Elizabeth Leveson-Gower, Countess of Sutherland

Charlotte Sophia Fitzalan-Howard (née Leveson-Gower), Duchess of Norfolk (bapt. 9 July 1788 – 7 July 1870) was a daughter of the 1st Duke of Sutherland and his wife, Elizabeth, suo jure Countess of Sutherland.

On 27 December 1814, she married Henry Charles Howard (b. 1791), the son and heir of Bernard Edward Howard, who was the heir presumptive to his childless and elderly cousin Charles Howard, 11th Duke of Norfolk. She became the Countess of Arundel and Surrey in 1815 when Bernard succeeded as 12th Duke, and upon the death of her husband's father in 1842, she became the Duchess of Norfolk. The couple later had five children:

- Henry Granville Fitzalan-Howard, 14th Duke of Norfolk (1815–1860)
- Lord Edward Fitzalan-Howard, 1st Baron Howard of Glossop (1818–1883)
- Lady Mary Charlotte Howard (1822–1897) m. Thomas Foley, 4th Baron Foley
- Lord Bernard Thomas Fitzalan-Howard (1825–1846)
- Lady Adeliza Matilda Fitzalan-Howard (1829-1904) m. her cousin Lord George Manners

Henry Charles Howard and his father were Roman Catholics, although his mother Lady Elizabeth Belasyse was Anglican. It is not clear if Howard was formally and nominally raised Anglican, or if he was already Catholic when he married into a prominent Whig (and therefore anti-Catholic) family. In 1829, after Catholic emancipation, the Earl of Surrey (as he now was) was elected a Member of Parliament.

One of the duchess's most accomplished works was a 166-piece collection of songs and piano pieces that she translated into five languages between 1811 and 1823. It includes works from composers such as Rousseau, Gay, Mozart, Arnold, Arne and Handel. The collection is currently held by Yale University.
