= Lilleshall Monument =

Monument in Lilleshall, Shropshire

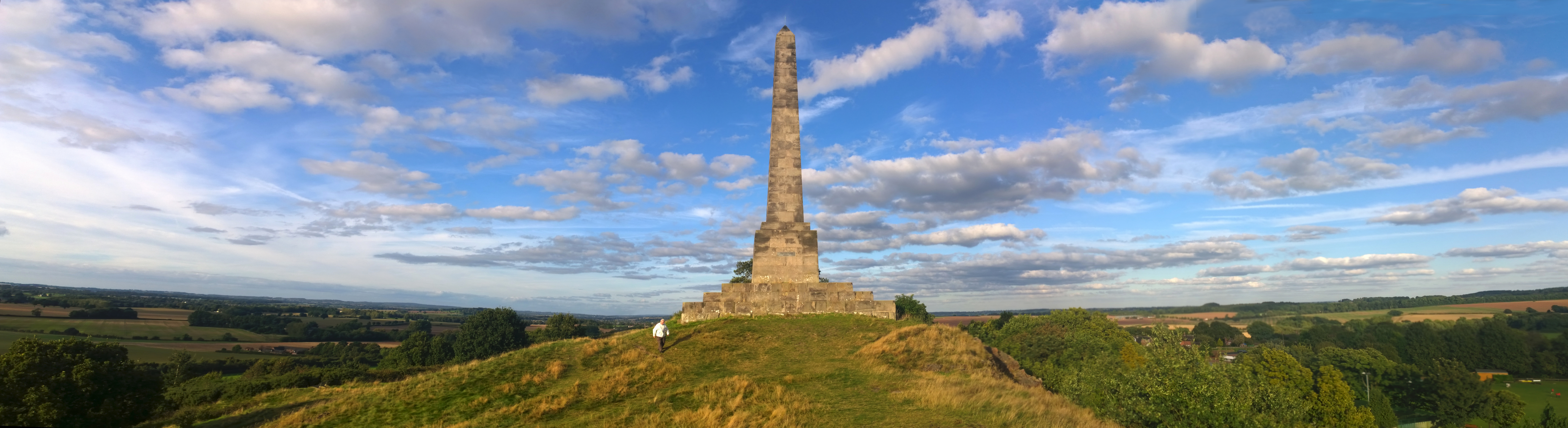
- Lilleshall Monument, Lilleshall
- Interactive map of Lilleshall Monument
- Location: Lilleshall, Shropshire
- Coordinates: 52°44′14.65″N 2°24′9.83″W
- Type: Memorial obelisk
- Height: 70 feet 0 inches (21.34 m)
- Beginning date: 1833
- Dedicated to: George Leveson-Gower, 1st Duke of Sutherland

The Lilleshall Monument, also known as the Sutherland Monument, is a 21-metre (70-foot) stone obelisk erected in 1833 on Lilleshall Hill overlooking the village of Lilleshall in Shropshire.

Commemorating George Leveson-Gower, 1st Duke of Sutherland, the monument is an ashlar obelisk on square plinth, standing on stepped base. The construction was originally funded through £933.15s collected from the Duke's tenants. Originally there were two lions and two griffins at each corner, however these were damaged after a violent thunderstorm and were removed.

There are two inscribed tablets on the monument, on both the north and south faces. The inscription on the southern side reads "LET ALL THE ENDS THOU AIMEST AT BE THY COUNTRY'S, THY GOD'S AND TRUTH'S", a quote from William Shakespeare's play Henry VIII spoken by the character Cardinal Wolsey. This references an exclamation made by the Duke of Sutherland during the 1820 trial of Queen Caroline. It was added in 2013, replacing a previous inscription which was stolen nearly forty years ago.

The tablet on the north face reads "To the memory of George Granville Leveson Gower, K.G. 1st Duke of Sutherland. The most just and generous of landlords. This monument is erected by the occupiers of his Grace's Shropshire farms as a public testimony that he went down to his grave with the blessings of his tenants on his head and left behind him upon his estates the best inheritance which a gentleman of England can bequeath to his son; men ready to stand by his house, heart and hand."

Historic England have classified the monument as a Grade II listed building.
