= Jimmy Poppitt =

English footballer

Personal information
- Full name: James Poppitt
- Date of birth: 26 February 1875
- Place of birth: Lilleshall, England
- Date of death: 17 June 1930 (aged 55)
- Place of death: Swindon, England
- Position: Inside forward

Senior career*
Years	Team	Apps	(Gls)
1896–1897	Wrockwardine Wood		
1897–1900	Wellington Town		
1900–1902	Wolverhampton Wanderers	21	(3)
1902–1903	Swindon Town		
1903–1904	Reading		
1904–1905	Swindon Town		
1905–1907	Notts County	15	(2)
1907–1908	Lincoln City	23	(3)
1908	Stanton Hill Victoria		
Total		59	(8)
- * Club domestic league appearances and goals

James Poppitt (26 February 1875–17 June 1930) was an English footballer who played in the Football League for Lincoln City, Notts County and Wolverhampton Wanderers.
