= Elizabeth Leveson-Gower, Duchess of Sutherland =

British duchess (1765–1839)

Her Grace The Duchess of Sutherland
- 19th Countess of Sutherland
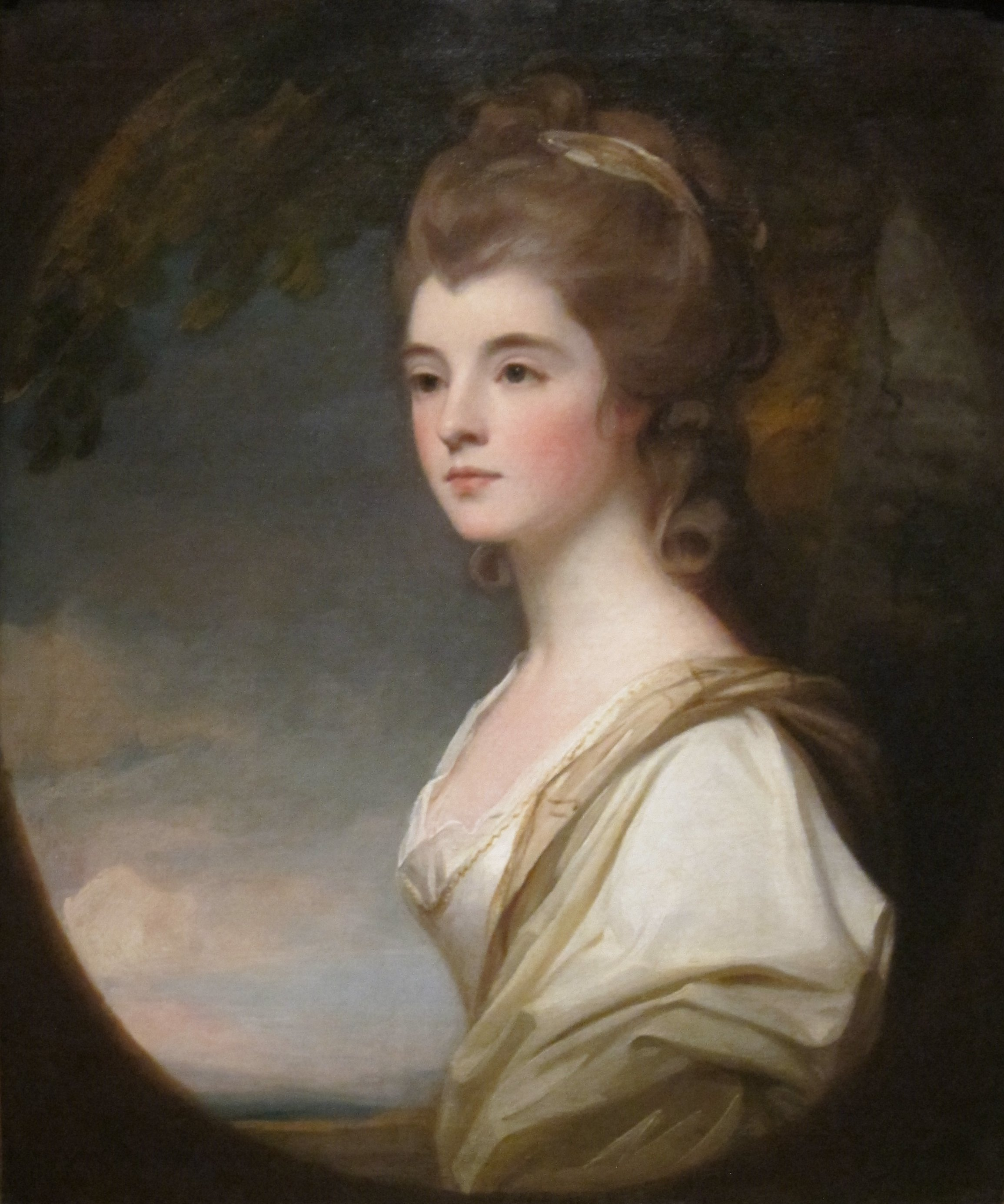
- Elizabeth, Duchess-Countess of Sutherland by George Romney
- Born: Lady Elizabeth Sutherland; 24 May 1765 near Edinburgh, Edinburghshire, Scotland
- Died: 29 January 1839 (aged 73); Hamilton Place, Hyde Park, London, England
- Buried: Dornoch Cathedral
- Spouse: George Leveson-Gower, 1st Duke of Sutherland (m. 1785; died 1833)
- Issue: George Sutherland-Leveson-Gower, 2nd Duke of Sutherland; Charlotte Fitzalan-Howard, Duchess of Norfolk; Elizabeth Grosvenor, Marchioness of Westminster; Francis Egerton, 1st Earl of Ellesmere
- Parents: William Sutherland, 18th Earl of Sutherland (father); Mary Maxwell (mother)

Elizabeth Leveson-Gower, Duchess of Sutherland (née Sutherland; 24 May 1765 – 29 January 1839), also suo jure 19th Countess of Sutherland, was a Scottish noblewoman who married into the Leveson-Gower family, best remembered for her involvement in the Highland Clearances.

In 1803, her husband inherited the income from the highly profitable Bridgewater Canal. This greatly increased his wealth, being described by Charles Greville as "the leviathan of wealth", with the belief that he was "the richest man who ever died" (his exact wealth at the time of his death was unknown, though undeniably very large). It is this wealth that allowed Lady Sutherland to embark on the substantial changes to the Sutherland estate that were part of the Highland Clearances.

== Biography ==
Elizabeth was born at Leven Lodge near Edinburgh, to William Sutherland, 18th Earl of Sutherland and his wife Mary (c. 1740–1766), the daughter and co-heir of William Maxwell, who owned slave plantations in the colony of Jamaica. Her parents died of "putrid fever" (typhus) in Bath in 1766, a few weeks after her first birthday. As the only surviving child, she succeeded to her father's estates and titles. Her title of Countess of Sutherland was contested by George Sutherland of Forse, a direct descendant of the 1st Earl of Sutherland, and by Sir Robert Gordon, Bt, also a descendant of the 1st Earl of Sutherland, but was confirmed by the House of Lords in 1771.

== Childhood and marriage ==
Lady Elizabeth Sutherland spent most of her childhood living in Edinburgh and London, where she was educated between 1779 and 1782. On 4 September 1785, at the age of 20, she married George Granville Leveson-Gower, Viscount Trentham, at St Marylebone Parish Church, London. He was known as Earl Gower from 1786 until, in 1803, he succeeded to his father's title of Marquess of Stafford. In 1832, just six months before he died, he was created Duke of Sutherland and she became known as Duchess-Countess of Sutherland.

== Sutherland estate ==
Under the terms of the marriage contract, control but not ownership of the Sutherland estate passed from Elizabeth to her husband for life. (Note: "The marriage settlement instituted a fresh enfeoffment in terms of the entail on the Sutherland estates, which were arranged on life rent to her husband" (Richards 2004, ref:odnb/42000).) The couple also purchased additional land in Sutherland between 1812 and 1816, bringing the proportion of the County of Sutherland owned by them to around 63% (as measured by rental value). At the time of Lady Sutherland's inheritance of the estate, there were a large number of wadsets (a type of mortgage) on much of the land, and further wadsets were taken out to finance, among other things, the time (1790-1792) that Lady Sutherland and her husband spent in France when he was ambassador there.

== Highland Clearances ==
The Highland Clearances were part of the Scottish Agricultural Revolution. The old run-rig arable areas were replaced with more modern farming methods, new crops and land drainage systems were introduced and, controversially, the mixed farming tenants in the inland straths and glens were evicted and their former tenancies were used for, most commonly, extensive sheep farms. Evicted tenants were often resettled in newly created crofting communities which, in many cases, were in coastal regions. These changes occurred over virtually all the Highlands and Islands region, mostly over the period 1790 to 1855. This provided higher rental income and lower running costs for the individual estates concerned.

The Sutherland estate made a slow start in this process, though some removals (Note: In the terminology used by estates at the time, removals meant that tenants were evicted from one part of the estate and offered alternative tenancies elsewhere) were made in 1772 whilst Lady Sutherland was still a child and the estate was managed by her tutors. Attempts were made to dislodge many of the tacksmen (Note: A tacksman (a member of the daoine uaisle, sometimes described as "gentry" in English) was the holder of a lease or "tack" from the landowner, subletting the land to lesser tenants. They acted as the middle stratum of pre-clearance society, with a significant role in managing the Highland economy. They were involved in running the baile, and trade in and out of the Highlands, especially in black cattle. They were the first sector of society to feel the effect of the social and economic changes that included the Clearances, when landlords restricted their ability to sub-let, so increasing the rental income directly to the laird; simple rent increases were also applied. This was part of a slow phasing out of this role, with change gathering momentum from the 1770s, with the result that in the next century, tacksmen were a minor component of society. T M Devine describes "the displacement of this class as one of the clearest demonstrations of the death of the old Gaelic society.") on the estate at this time. Notable emigrations of tenants had taken place and plans were considered for new fishing villages to provide employment for tenants moved from the interior. However, the estate was handicapped by a serious shortage of the needed capital, and these large plans were deferred until money became available.

In 1803, when George Leveson-Gower inherited the huge fortune of the last Duke of Bridgewater, funds were available for the Sutherland estate to proceed with a programme of improvement. Many of the estate's leases did not end until 1807, but planning was started to restructure the estate. Despite the conventions of the day and the provisions of the entailment, Leveson-Gower delegated overall control of the estate to Lady Sutherland; she took an active interest in its management.

As the major part of the Sutherland Clearances began, Lady Sutherland and her advisors were influenced by several things. Firstly, a substantial population increase was occurring. Secondly, the area was prone to famine - and in these years it fell to the landlord to organise relief by buying meal on the open market and importing it into the area. The degree of severity of famine is a matter of debate among historians now and also within the Sutherland estate management in their near-contemporaneous analysis of the clearances in 1845. (Note: In 1808 Lady Sutherland had written to her husband to express the view that many of the tenantry would have died if the factor had not bought corn from Peterhead to feed the local population. (The cost of this would later be repaid by the recipients: it was in effect a large emergency loan program.) The same year featured in the recollections of an estate advisor (in 1845): "The cattle on Sutherland were that Spring dying from scarcity of Provender....and this is the condition to which your morbid Philanthropists of the present day refer as the days of comfort for the wretched Highlanders.")

The third driving force was the whole range of new thinking on agricultural improvement. This took in economic ideas expressed by Adam Smith as well as those of many agriculturalists. For the Highlands, the main thrust of these theories was the much greater rental return to be obtained from sheep. Wool prices had increased faster than other commodities since the 1780s. This enabled sheep farmers to pay substantially higher rents than the current tenants.

Now that capital funding was available, the first big sheep farm was let at Lairg in 1807, involving the removal of about 300 people. Many of these did not accept their new homes and emigrated, to the dissatisfaction of the estate management and Lady Sutherland. In 1809, William Young and Patrick Sellar arrived in Sutherland and made contact with the Sutherland family, becoming key advisors to the owners of the estate. They offered ambitious plans which matched the desire for rapid results.

Lady Sutherland had already dismissed the estate's factor, David Campbell, in 1807 for lack of progress. His replacement, Cosmo Falconer, found his position being undermined by the advice offered by Young and Sellar. In August 1810 Falconer agreed to leave, with effect from 2 June 1811, and Young and Sellar took over in his place. (Note: The details of this joint position were not well worked out - so providing reason for Sellar to complain about his role to Lady Sutherland even before the agreement came into effect. Young had the senior position and was responsible for 'progressive improvements' on the estate, whilst Sellar (who had trained as a lawyer) collected rents, kept accounts, drafted leases, ensured tenants complied with the terms of their leases and enforced the protection of plantations and game on the estate.)

Young had a proven track record of agricultural improvement in Moray and Sellar was a lawyer educated at Edinburgh University; both were fully versed in the modern ideas of Adam Smith. They provided an extra level of ambition for the estate. New industries were added to the plans, to employ the resettled population. A coal mine was sunk at Brora, and fishing villages were built to exploit the herring shoals off the coast. Other ideas were tanning, flax, salt and brick manufacturing.

The first clearances under the factorship of Young and Sellar were conducted in Assynt in 1812, under the direction of Sellar, establishing large sheep farms and resettling the old tenants on the coast. Sellar had the assistance of the local tacksmen in this and the process was conducted without unrest - despite the unpopularity of events. However, in 1813, planned clearances in the Strath of Kildonan were accompanied by riots; an angry mob drove prospective sheep farmers out of the valley when they came to view the land, and a situation of confrontation existed for more than six weeks, Sellar failing to successfully negotiate with the protesters.

Ultimately, the army was called out and the estate made concessions such as paying very favourable prices for the cattle of those being cleared. This was assisted by landlords in surrounding districts taking in some of those displaced and an organised party emigrating to Canada. The whole process was a severe shock to Lady Sutherland and her advisers, who were, in the words of historian Eric Richards, "genuinely astonished at this response to plans which they regarded as wise and benevolent".

Further clearances were scheduled in Strathnaver starting at Whitsun, 1814. These were complicated by Sellar having successfully bid for the lease of one of the new sheep farms on land that it was now his responsibility, as factor, to clear. (Overall, this clearance was part of the removal of 430 families from Strathnaver and Brora in 1814 – an estimated 2,000 people.) Sellar had also made an enemy of the local law officer, Robert Mackid, by catching him poaching on the Sutherlands' land.

There was some confusion among the tenants as Sellar made concessions to some of them, allowing them to stay in their properties a little longer. Some tenants moved in advance of the date in their eviction notice; others stayed until the eviction parties arrived.

As was normal practice, the roof timbers of cleared houses were destroyed to prevent re-occupation after the eviction party had left. On 13 June 1814, this was done by burning in the case of Badinloskin, the house occupied by William Chisholm. Accounts vary, but it is possible that his elderly and bedridden mother-in-law was still in the house when it was set on fire. In James Hunter's understanding of events, Sellar ordered her to be immediately carried out as soon as he realised what was happening. She died six days later. Eric Richards suggests that the old woman was carried to an outbuilding before the house was destroyed.

Whatever the facts of the matter, Sellar was charged with culpable homicide and arson, in respect of this incident and others during this clearance. The charges were brought by Robert Mackid, driven by the enmity he held for Sellar for catching him poaching. As the trial approached, the Sutherland estate was reluctant to assist Sellar in his defence, distancing themselves from their employee. He was acquitted of all charges at his trial in 1816. The estate managers were hugely relieved, taking this as a justification of their clearance activity. Robert Mackid became a ruined man and had to leave the county, providing Sellar with a grovelling letter of apology and confession.)

Despite the acquittal, this event, and Sellar's role in it, were fixed in the popular view of the Sutherland Clearances. James Loch, the Stafford estate commissioner was now taking a greater interest in the Northern part of his employer's holdings; he thought Young's financial management was incompetent, and Sellar's actions among the people deeply concerning. Both Sellar and William Young soon left their management posts with the Sutherland estate (though Sellar remained as a major tenant). Loch, nevertheless, also subscribed to the theory that clearance was beneficial for the tenants as much as for the estate.

Lady Sutherland's displeasure with events was increased by critical reports in a minor London newspaper, the Military Register, from April 1815. These were soon carried in larger newspapers. They originated from Alexander Sutherland who, with his brother John Sutherland of Sciberscross, (Note: The territorial designation after his name denotes that the Sutherland brothers were members of the daoine uaisle or tacksman class, sometimes described as 'gentry'.) were opponents of clearance. Alexander, after serving as a captain in the army, had been thwarted in his hopes of taking up leases on the Sutherland estate and now worked as a journalist in London. He was therefore well placed to cause trouble for the estate.

The (effective) dismissal of Sellar placed him in the role of scapegoat, thereby preventing a proper critical analysis of the estate's policies. Clearances continued under the factorship of Frances Suther and the overall control of James Loch. Through 1816 and 1817, famine conditions affected most of the inland areas and the estate had to provide relief to those who were destitute. This altered policy on emigration: if tenants wanted to emigrate, the estate would not object, but there was still no active encouragement.

In 1818 the largest part of the clearance program was put into effect, lasting until 1820. Loch gave emphatic instructions intended to avoid another public relations disaster: rent arrears could be excused for those who co-operated, time was to be taken and rents for the new crofts were to be set as low as possible.

The process did not start well. The Reverend David Mackenzie of Kildonan wrote to Loch on behalf of the 220 families due to be cleared from his parish. He categorically challenged the basic premise of the clearance: that the people from an inland region could make a living on their new coastal crofts. Loch was adamant that the removals would go ahead regardless of objections.

Yet, at the same time, Suther and the local ground officer of the estate were pointing out to Loch that few of the new crofts were of an acceptable quality. Some tenants were considering moving off the estate, either to Caithness or emigrating to America or the Cape of Good Hope, which Suther encouraged by writing off their rent arrears. More positively for those with eviction notices, cattle prices were high in 1818. Ultimately, that year's clearances passed without serious protest.

Over the next 2 years, the scale of clearance increased: 425 families (about 2,000 people) in 1819 and 522 families in 1820. Loch was anxious to move quickly, whilst cattle prices were high and there was a good demand for leases of sheep farms. There was no violent resistance in 1819, but Suther, despite precise instructions to the contrary, used fire to destroy cleared houses. This came after a spell of dry weather, in which the turf and stone walls of the houses had dried out, so that even the turf in the walls ignited, adding to the blaze of the thatch and roof timbers. Multiplied over the large number of properties that were cleared, this made a horrific impression on those who observed it.

The public relations disaster that Loch had wished to avoid now followed, with The Observer newspaper running the headline: "the Devastation of Sutherland". 1819 became known as "the year of the burnings" (bliadhna na losgaidh). (Note: The journalist and popular author John Prebble, in his book published in 1963 attributes the term "the year of the burnings" to 1814. This appears to be an error, but as Prebble's book was widely read, this has been copied into many of the minor populist works on the subject. The account of Donald MacLeod, who claims to have been an eye-witness to the Sutherland Clearances, though it does not use the term "year of the burnings", strongly suggests that historian James Hunter's interpretation of the phrase is correct.) Loch severely admonished Suther for using fire in making the houses uninhabitable. Suther defended his actions by explaining how cleared tenants in Kildonan had rebuilt their houses as soon as the eviction parties had left. Loch conceded that this was one of the realities of the process of clearance, but did not rescind the prohibition of burning houses from which tenants had been evicted.

In the autumn of 1819, the Sutherland Estate management received reports of growing hostility to further clearances. The Sutherland family were sent anonymous threatening letters to their house in London. The Transatlantic Emigration Society provided a focus for resistance to the clearances planned in 1820, holding large meetings and conducting extensive correspondence with newspapers about the situation of Sutherland tenants. This publicity caused great concern to Loch, and the comment in the press increased as Whitsun 1820 approached.

Lady Sutherland felt that her family was being particularly targeted by critics of the clearances, so she asked Loch to find out what neighbouring estates had done. The answer was that Lord Moray in Ross-shire had, on occasion, bought the cattle owned by evicted tenants, but otherwise had made no provision for them: they had simply been evicted with no compensation or alternative tenancies offered. The tenants of Munro of Novar were also simply evicted, with many of them emigrating.

As the 1820 Sutherland clearances approached, there was notable rioting at Culrain on the Munro of Novar estate, protesting at their clearance plans. Loch worried that this would spread to the Sutherland tenants, but no violent physical resistance occurred, with those cleared demonstrating (in the words of Eric Richards) "sullen acquiescence".

In June there was serious resistance to clearance in another nearby estate, at Gruids. Richards attributes the lack of violence in the Sutherland Estate to the resettlement arrangements in place there, stating: "In this sense the Sutherland estate was, despite its reputation, in strong and positive contrast to most other clearing proprietors."

1819 and 1820 represented the main clearance activity on the Sutherland Estate. The much smaller clearance in the spring of 1821 at Achness and Ascoilmore met with obstruction and the military had to be called in to carry out evictions by force. Complaints of cruelty and negligence were made against the estate, but an internal enquiry absolved the factor of any wrongdoing. However, it is highly likely that this conclusion glossed over the suffering experienced by those evicted.

Figures gathered by the estate give some information on where tenants, sub-tenants and squatters were after the evictions in 1819 (not everyone who was evicted was a rent-paying tenant, some had no right to be there in the first place). For tenants, 68% became tenants elsewhere on the estate, 7% went to neighbouring estates, 21% to adjoining counties and 2% emigrated. The remaining 2% were unaccounted for. The sub-tenants and squatters were divided up into 73% resettled on the coast, 7% in neighbouring estates, 13% to nearby counties and 5% emigrated. 2% were unaccounted for. This survey does not pick up information on those who subsequently travelled elsewhere.

Loch issued instructions to Suther at the end of 1821 that brought the major clearance activity of the estate to an end. Some small-scale clearance activity continued for the next 20 years or so, but this was not part of the overall plan to resettle the population in coastal settlements and engage them in alternative industries.

== Other interests ==
Lady Sutherland twice raised a volunteer regiment, the "Sutherlandshire Fencibles", in 1779 and 1793, which was later deployed in suppressing the Irish Rebellion of 1798.

In 1790 her husband was appointed Ambassador to France and she accompanied him to Paris. She was able to witness the revolutionary events first-hand and wrote descriptions of the political turmoil in France at that time. Lady Sutherland and her husband had difficulty obtaining permission to leave Paris and did not finally travel to London until 1792.

During the 1790s, Lady Sutherland became a leading figure of the social season in London. Her dinner parties and balls were attended by royalty, nobility and leading politicians, both foreign and domestic. She and her husband became close friends with George Canning who considered her beautiful, intelligent, and charming - a view not shared by members of her own class and sex, who thought her overbearing.

When not in public, Lady Sutherland's interests included corresponding with Sir Walter Scott and, as she was a gifted artist, painting watercolour landscapes of the Sutherland coast and of Dunrobin Castle, among other subjects. She was also an accomplished oil painter. She drew and etched a series of views in Orkney and the northeast coast of Scotland, which were published between 1805 and 1807.

Lady Sutherland spent much time raising her four children. She placed a special emphasis on maximising the wealth of her sons and (as was common at the time) obtaining the best possible marriages for her daughters. Eric Richards observes that she "dominated her sons and probably her husband as well".

Shortly before his death in July 1833, her husband was created Duke of Sutherland and Lady Sutherland became the Duchess of Sutherland. After her husband's death, her Scottish estates were managed for her on her behalf. She died, aged seventy-three, on 29 January 1839 at Hamilton Place, Hyde Park, London. She was buried on 20 February 1839, with great pomp at Dornoch Cathedral, in Sutherland. Her comital title passed to her eldest son, George.

== Family ==
On 4 September 1785, Lady Sutherland married Lord George Leveson-Gower and they had four surviving children:

- George Granville Leveson-Gower, later Sutherland-Leveson-Gower, styled Earl Gower, later styled Marquess of Stafford, later 2nd Duke of Sutherland (1786–1861)
- The Lady Charlotte Sophia Leveson-Gower (c. 1788–1870), married Henry Fitzalan-Howard, 13th Duke of Norfolk and had issue.
- The Lady Elizabeth Mary Leveson-Gower (1797–1891), married Richard Grosvenor, 2nd Marquess of Westminster and had issue.
- The Lord Francis Leveson-Gower, later Egerton, later 1st Earl of Ellesmere (1800–1857)

== Notes ==
Peerage of Scotland
Preceded by William Sutherland	Countess of Sutherland; 1766–1839	Succeeded by George Sutherland-Leveson-Gower
