= George Leveson-Gower, 1st Duke of Sutherland =

English politician, diplomat and landowner

His Grace The Duke of Sutherland KG PC
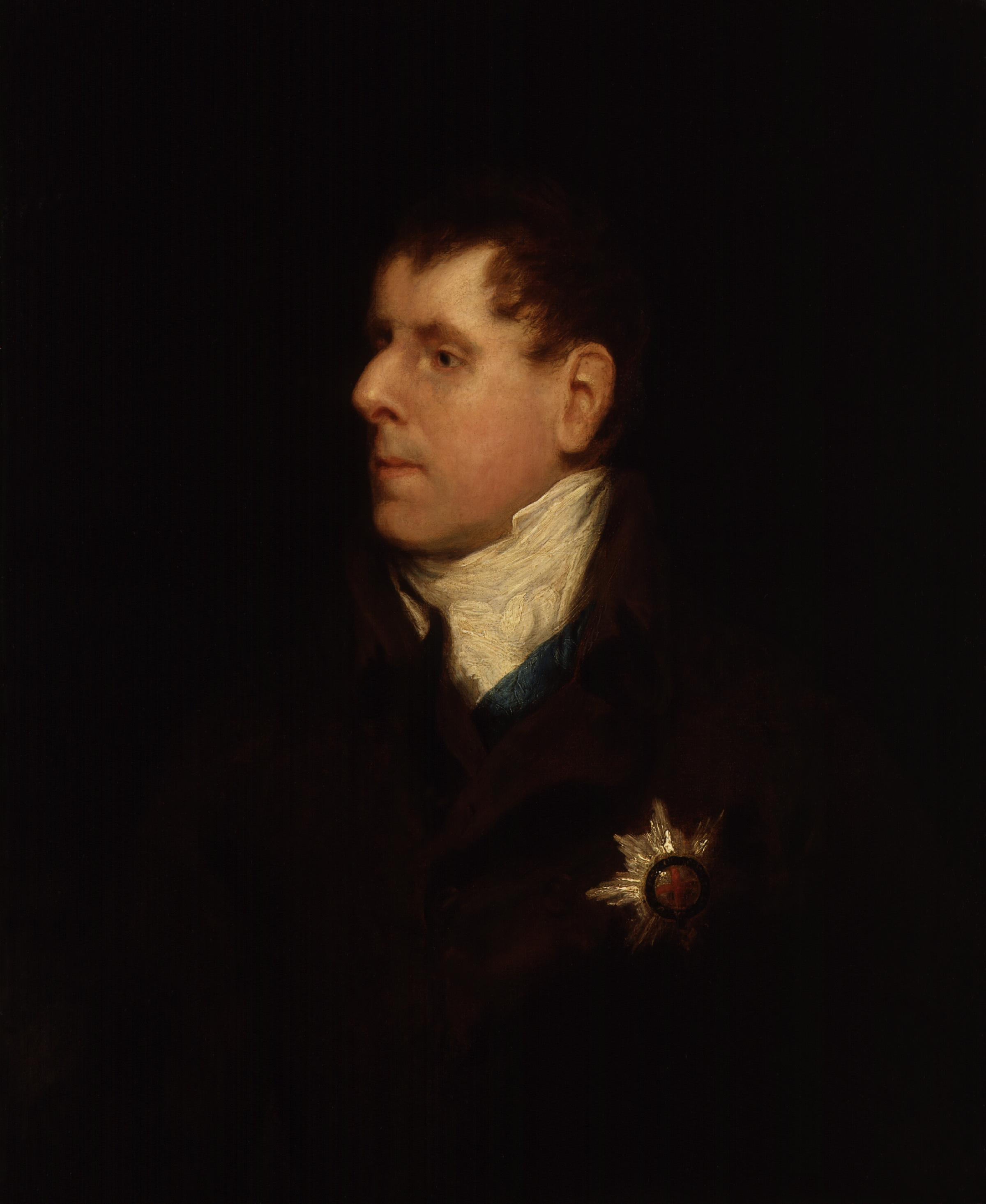

Member of Parliament for Newcastle-under-Lyme
- In office 1779–1784 Serving with The Earl Waldegrave and Sir Archibald Macdonald
- Preceded by: Sir George Hay
- Succeeded by: Richard Vernon

Ambassador to France
- In office 1790–1792
- Monarch: George III
- Preceded by: The Duke of Dorset
- Succeeded by: Vacant

Member of Parliament for Staffordshire
- In office 1787–1799 Serving with Sir Edward Littleton, Bt.
- Preceded by: Sir Edward Littleton, Bt; Sir John Wrottesley, Bt
- Succeeded by: Sir Edward Littleton, Bt; The Earl Granville

Personal details
- Born: 9 January 1758 London, England
- Died: 19 July 1833 (aged 75) Dunrobin Castle, Sutherland
- Spouse: Elizabeth Sutherland, 19th Countess of Sutherland (m. 1785)
- Children: George Sutherland-Leveson-Gower, 2nd Duke of Sutherland; Charlotte Fitzalan-Howard, Duchess of Norfolk; Elizabeth Grosvenor, Marchioness of Westminster; Francis Egerton, 1st Earl of Ellesmere
- Parents: Granville Leveson-Gower, 1st Marquess of Stafford; Lady Louisa Egerton
- Education: Christ Church, Oxford

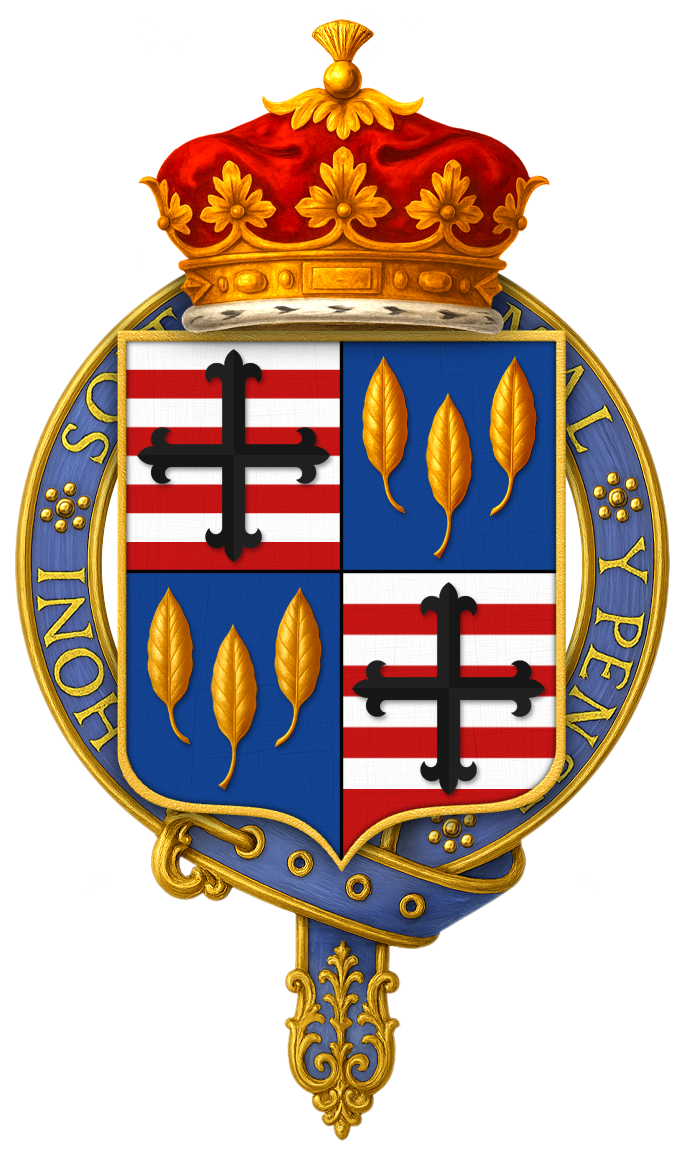
Quartered arms of George Granville Leveson-Gower, 1st Duke of Sutherland, KG, PC

George Granville Leveson-Gower, 1st Duke of Sutherland KG, PC (9 January 1758 – 19 July 1833), known as Viscount Trentham from 1758 to 1786, as Earl Gower from 1786 to 1803 and as the Marquess of Stafford from 1803 to 1833, was an English politician, diplomat, landowner and patron of the arts from the Leveson-Gower family. He was the wealthiest man in Britain during the latter part of his life. He remains a controversial figure for his role in the Highland Clearances.

== Background ==
Sutherland was the elder son of Granville Leveson-Gower, 2nd Earl Gower (1st Marquess of Stafford from 1786), by his second wife, the former Lady Louisa Egerton, daughter of Scroop Egerton, 1st Duke of Bridgewater. His mother died when he was 3, and his father remarried to Lady Susanna Stewart, daughter of Alexander Stewart, 6th Earl of Galloway. Lord Granville Leveson-Gower, later 1st Earl Granville, was his younger half-brother from this marriage. Styled Viscount Trentham as his father's heir, he was educated at Westminster and at Christ Church, Oxford, where he graduated MA in 1777.

== Earlier political career ==
Trentham sat as Member of Parliament for Newcastle-under-Lyme from 1779 to 1784. Having become Earl Gower on his father's elevation to a marquessate in 1786, he then sat for Staffordshire from 1787 to 1799, being appointed a Privy Counsellor in 1790. In 1799, he was summoned to the House of Lords through a writ of acceleration in his father's junior title of Baron Gower (though he continued to be known by the higher courtesy title of Earl Gower).

== Ambassador during French Revolution ==
Between 1790 and 1792 he was Ambassador to France. Gower was appointed ambassador in Paris in June 1790 at the age of 32. Due to Louis XVI being under house arrest in the Tuileries Palace, Gower was unable to become 'an ornament at Versailles', i.e. was unable to work closely with the royal family. Gower was scarcely better equipped to handle the complexity of the French Revolution than his predecessor, the Duke of Dorset. He had no previous experience of diplomacy. Gower's main priority in Paris was to provide news from the French court back to Britain, however trivial. Though Gower also reported some popular 'disturbances', he had little comprehension of the broader political climate. On 10 August 1792 an insurrection by the newly established Paris Revolutionary Commune drove the royal family from the Tuileries and three days later Louis was arrested and imprisoned in the Temple fortress. Britain broke off diplomatic relations in protest. The closure of the British embassy meant that the intelligence operations could no longer be run from it, resulting in Britain replacing the ambassador with Captain George Monro, removing Gower from diplomacy in France.

== Later political career ==
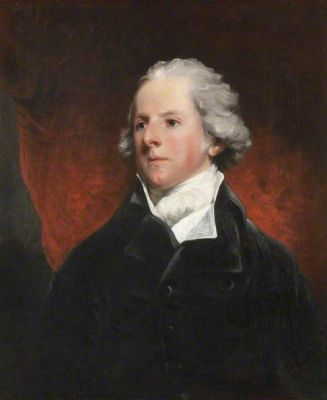
George Leveson-Gower by Thomas Lawrence, 1800

After his return to Britain he declined the posts of Lord Steward of the Household and Lord-Lieutenant of Ireland. On 20 September 1794, he was appointed Colonel of the new Staffordshire Regiment of Gentlemen and Yeomanry, personally commanding the Newcastle-under-Lyme Troop. He retired from the command in January 1800.

In 1799 he accepted the office of joint Postmaster General, which he retained until 1801. He succeeded his father as Marquess of Stafford in 1803. The now Lord Stafford played an important part in the downfall of Henry Addington's administration in 1804, after which he changed political allegiance from the Tory to the Whig party. After 1807 he played little part in politics, although late in life he supported Catholic Emancipation and the Reform Act 1832.

He also held the honorary posts of Lord Lieutenant of Staffordshire from 1799 to 1801 and Lord Lieutenant of Sutherland from 1794 to 1830. He was invested as a Knight of the Garter in 1806.

In 1831, Stafford served the annual post of treasurer of the Salop Infirmary in Shrewsbury.

He was created Duke of Sutherland on 28 January 1833; he held that title for less than six months until his death later that year.

== Land ownership ==
=== Wealth ===
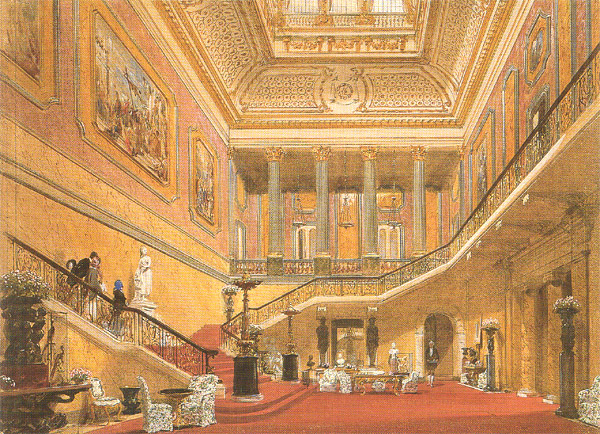
Lancaster House (previously called Stafford House)

The Leveson-Gower family owned extensive lands in Staffordshire, Shropshire and Yorkshire. In 1803 Sutherland also succeeded to the vast estates of his maternal uncle Francis Egerton, 3rd Duke of Bridgewater, which included the Bridgewater Canal and a major art collection including much of the Orleans Collection; both Gower and his uncle had been members of the consortium which brought it to London for dispersal. According to the will of the Duke of Bridgewater, these passed on the death of the first Duke of Sutherland to his third son Lord Francis Leveson-Gower (see below). This inheritance brought him great wealth. Sutherland is estimated to have been the wealthiest man of the 19th century, surpassing even Nathan Rothschild. The precise value of his estate at death is unknown, as it was simply classed as 'upper value'. He was described by Charles Greville as a "leviathan of wealth" and "...the richest individual who ever died". Following the death of the Duke of York in 1827 he purchased the leasehold of Stafford House (now Lancaster House), which became the London residence of the dukes of Sutherland until 1912.

=== Development of Sutherland and Highland clearances ===
Sutherland and his wife, the Countess of Sutherland, remain controversial figures for their role in the Highland Clearances, where thousands of tenants were evicted and rehoused in coastal crofts as part of a programme of improvement. The larger clearances in Sutherland were undertaken between 1811 and 1820. In 1811 Parliament passed an Act granting half the expenses of building roads in northern Scotland, on the provision that landowners paid for the other half. The following year Sutherland commenced building roads and bridges in the county, which up to that point had been virtually non-existent. Appalled by the poor living conditions of his tenants and influenced by social and economic theories of the day as well as consulting widely on the subject, he and his wife (to whom much of the proprietorial oversight of the estate had been delegated) became convinced that subsistence farming in the interior of Sutherland could not be sustained in the long term. Much higher rents could be obtained from letting land for extensive sheep farms—so providing a much better income from the estate.

The Sutherland estate management had had plans for clearance for some years, with some clearance activity in 1772 when Lady Sutherland was still a child. However, a shortage of money stopped these plans from progressing to any greater degree—a situation that continued after her marriage to Leveson-Gower. However, when he inherited the vast wealth of the Duke of Bridgewater, plans could proceed—and Leveson-Gower was happy for large amounts of his wealth to be spent on the changes to the Sutherland estate. Though unusual for the time, much of the oversight of the estate management was delegated to Lady Sutherland, who took a keen interest in the estate, travelling to Dunrobin Castle most summers and engaging in a continuous exchange of correspondence with the factor and James Loch, the Stafford estate commissioner.

The first of the new wave of clearances involved relocations from Assynt to coastal villages, with the plan that farmers could take up fishing. The next eviction, in the Strath of Kildonan in 1813, was met with opposition and a six-week-long confrontation that was resolved by calling out the army, and the estate making some concessions to those who were evicted. In 1814, one of the estate's factors, Patrick Sellar, was supervising clearances in Strathnaver when the roof timbers of a house were set on fire (to prevent the house being reoccupied after the eviction) with, allegedly, an elderly and bedridden woman still inside. The woman was rescued, but died six days later. The local law officer, Robert Mackid, was an enemy of Sellar and started taking witness statements so that Sellar could be prosecuted. The case went to trial in 1816, and Sellar was acquitted. The publicity arising from the trial was not welcome to the Sutherlands. Sellar was replaced as factor and further, larger clearances continued in 1818 to 1820. Despite efforts to avoid press comment, in 1819 The Observer newspaper ran the headline: "the Devastation of Sutherland", reporting the burning of roof timbers of large numbers of houses cleared at the same time.

== Family ==
The then Lord Trentham married Elizabeth Sutherland, 19th Countess of Sutherland, daughter of William Sutherland, 18th Earl of Sutherland (whom she had succeeded in that title as an infant) and the former Mary Maxwell (who had died just before her husband), on 4 September 1785. They had four surviving children:

- George Sutherland-Leveson-Gower, Marquess of Stafford (11 August 1786 – 27 February 1861), later 2nd Duke of Sutherland.
- Lady Charlotte Sophia Leveson-Gower (c. 1788 – 7 July 1870), married Henry Howard (later 13th Duke of Norfolk) and had issue.
- Lady Elizabeth Mary Leveson-Gower (1797–1891), married Richard Grosvenor, Viscount Belgrave (later 2nd Marquess of Westminster) and had issue.
- Lord Francis Leveson-Gower, later Egerton (1 January 1800 – 18 February 1857), later 1st Earl of Ellesmere.

== Final years and death ==
Eleven years after becoming enfeebled by a paralytic stroke, Sutherland died at Dunrobin Castle in July 1833, aged 75, and was buried at Dornoch Cathedral. He was succeeded by his eldest son, George. The Duchess of Sutherland died in January 1839, aged 73, and was also succeeded by her eldest son, George.

The Bridgewater Estate was passed in trust in accordance with the Duke of Bridgewater's will, to the Duke's third son Francis.

== Ancestry ==
Ancestors of George Leveson-Gower, 1st Duke of Sutherland

16. Sir William Leveson-Gower, 4th Baronet
8. John Leveson-Gower, 1st Baron Gower
17. Lady Jane Granville
4. John Leveson-Gower, 1st Earl Gower
18. John Manners, 1st Duke of Rutland
9. Lady Catherine Manners
19. Catherine Wriothesley Noel
2. Granville Leveson-Gower, 1st Marquess of Stafford
20. Robert Pierrepont, of Thoresby, Nottinghamshire
10. Evelyn Pierrepont, 1st Duke of Kingston-upon-Hull
21. Elizabeth Evelyn
5. Lady Evelyn Pierrepont
22. William Feilding, 3rd Earl of Denbigh
11. Lady Mary Feilding
23. Mary King
1. George Leveson-Gower, 1st Duke of Sutherland
24. John Egerton, 2nd Earl of Bridgewater
12. John Egerton, 3rd Earl of Bridgewater
25. Lady Elizabeth Cavendish
6. Scroop Egerton, 1st Duke of Bridgewater
26. Charles Paulet, 1st Duke of Bolton
13. Lady Jane Paulet
27. Mary Scrope
3. Lady Louisa Egerton
28. William Russell, Lord Russell
14. Wriothesley Russell, 2nd Duke of Bedford
29. Lady Rachel Wriothesley
7. Lady Rachel Russell
30. John Howland of Streatham
15. Elizabeth Howland
31. Elizabeth Child

== Legacy ==
=== Monuments ===
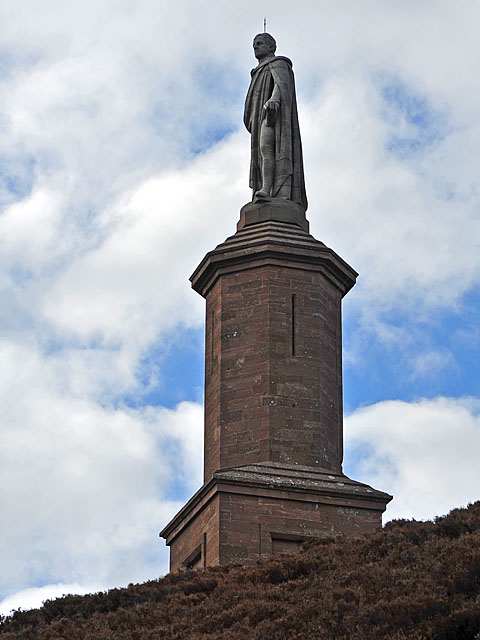
Monument to First Duke of Sutherland on Ben Bhraggie near Golspie

There is a monument to Leveson-Gower in Shropshire. The Lilleshall Monument, built in 1833, is a 70-foot-high (21 m) obelisk, a local landmark visible for some distance around which stands on top of Lilleshall Hill, within the original estates of the Leveson family acquired on the dissolution of Lilleshall Abbey. The tablet on the north face of the monument reads "To the memory of George Granville Leveson Gower, K.G. 1st Duke of Sutherland. The most just and generous of landlords. This monument is erected by the occupiers of his Grace's Shropshire farms as a public testimony that he went down to his grave with the blessings of his tenants on his head and left behind him upon his estates the best inheritance which a gentleman of England can bequeath to his son; men ready to stand by his house, heart and hand."

There is also a monument erected in the Trentham Estate, Staffordshire. This colossal statue, designed by Winks and sculptured by Sir Francis Leggatt Chantrey, surmounts a plain column of stone on a tiered pedestal. The monument was raised in 1834 at the instigation of the second Duke, a year after the first Duke's death.

In 1837 a large monument, known locally as the Mannie, was erected on Ben Bhraggie near Golspie to commemorate the Duke's life. The existence of this statue has been the subject of some controversy—in 1994, Sandy Lindsay, a former Scottish National Party councillor from Inverness proposed its demolition. He later altered his plan, asking permission from the local council to relocate the statue and replace it with plaques telling the story of the Clearances. Lindsay proposed moving the statue to the grounds of Dunrobin Castle, after the J. Paul Getty Museum in Los Angeles declined his offer to take it. There was a failed attempt by vandals to topple the statue in November 2011. A BBC news report of this incident quoted a local person saying that few people wished the statue removed; instead they saw it as an important reminder of history. As of March 2026, however, the statue still stands.

=== Criticism ===
Due to his controversial role in the Sutherland Clearances, the "Mannie" statue to the Duke in Golspie, Sutherland has been subject to repeated vandalism.

There are several well-known Gaelic songs mocking the duke personally. Perhaps the most famous of these is Dùthaich Mhic Aoidh (Mackay Country or Northern Sutherland, a region hit hard by the Clearances), written by Ewen Robertson, who became known as the "Bard of the Clearances."

Ciad Diùc Cataibh, le chuid foill,
'S le chuid càirdeas do na Goill,

Gum b' ann an Iutharn 'n robh do thoil,
'S gum b'fheàrr leam Iùdas làmh rium.

—
Translation:

First Duke of Sutherland, with your deceit,
And with your friendship with the Lowlanders,

It's in hell that you belong,
I'd rather have Judas by my side.

Parliament of Great Britain
Preceded by George Hay; Viscount Chewton	Member of Parliament for Newcastle-under-Lyme; 1779–1784; With: Viscount Chewton 1779; Archibald Macdonald 1780–1784	Succeeded by Richard Vernon; Archibald Macdonald
Preceded by Sir John Wrottesley, Bt; Sir Edward Littleton, Bt	Member of Parliament for Staffordshire; 1787–1799; With: Sir Edward Littleton, Bt	Succeeded by Lord Granville Leveson-Gower; Sir Edward Littleton, Bt
Diplomatic posts
Preceded by The Duke of Dorset	British Ambassador to France; 1790–1792	Vacant French Revolutionary Wars Title next held by The Marquess Cornwallis
Military offices
New unit	Colonel, Staffordshire Yeomanry; 1794–1800	Succeeded by Hon Edward Monckton
Honorary titles
Preceded by The Marquess of Stafford	Lord Lieutenant of Staffordshire; 1799–1801	Succeeded by The Earl of Uxbridge
Preceded by The Marquess of Stafford	Custos Rotulorum of Staffordshire; 1799–1828	Succeeded by The Earl Talbot
New office	Lord Lieutenant of Sutherland; 1794–1830	Succeeded by Earl Gower
Peerage of the United Kingdom
New creation	Duke of Sutherland; 1833	Succeeded by George Sutherland-Leveson-Gower
Peerage of Great Britain
Preceded by Granville Leveson-Gower	Marquess of Stafford; 1803–1833	Succeeded by George Sutherland-Leveson-Gower
Peerage of England
Preceded by Granville Leveson-Gower	Baron Gower (descended by acceleration); 1799–1826	Succeeded by George Sutherland-Leveson-Gower
