= Sally Poppitt =

New Zealand nutrition academic

Sally Diana Poppitt
- Education: Aberdeen University
- Scientific career
- Fields: Human nutrition
- Workplaces: Cambridge University, University of Auckland
- Thesis: Energetics of reproduction and overwintering in some insectivorous mammals (Mammalia; Insectivora) (1988)

Sally Diana Poppitt is a New Zealand nutrition academic. She is currently a full professor at the University of Auckland where she holds the Fonterra Chair in Human Nutrition since June 2012.

== Biography ==
Poppitt is originally from Cambridge, England. Her 1988 PhD thesis at Aberdeen University was titled 'Energetics of reproduction and overwintering in some insectivorous mammals' , supervised by Paul Racey and John Speakman FRS. After graduation, she worked for Dunn Human Nutrition, both in Gambia and University of Cambridge and then moved to the University of Auckland, rising to full professor. She is the founding director of the University of Auckland's Human Nutrition Unit. Poppitt was also named Director of Clinical Trials Development in Protemix, a biotechnology spinoff company from the university from 2006.

== Selected works ==
- Poppitt, Sally D., Geraldine F. Keogh, Andrew M. Prentice, Desmond EM Williams, Heidi MW Sonnemans, Esther EJ Valk, Elizabeth Robinson, and Nicholas J. Wareham. "Long-term effects of ad libitum low-fat, high-carbohydrate diets on body weight and serum lipids in overweight subjects with metabolic syndrome." The American journal of clinical nutrition 75, no. 1 (2002): 11–20.
- McGill, Anne-Thea, Joanna M. Stewart, Fiona E. Lithander, Caroline M. Strik, and Sally D. Poppitt. "Relationships of low serum vitamin D 3 with anthropometry and markers of the metabolic syndrome and diabetes in overweight and obesity." Nutrition journal 7, no. 1 (2008): 4.
- Poppitt, Sally D., Deirdre McCormack, and Rochelle Buffenstein. "Short-term effects of macronutrient preloads on appetite and energy intake in lean women." Physiology & behavior 64, no. 3 (1998): 279–285.
- Keogh, Geraldine F., Garth JS Cooper, Tom B. Mulvey, Brian H. McArdle, Graeme D. Coles, John A. Monro, and Sally D. Poppitt. "Randomized controlled crossover study of the effect of a highly β-glucan–enriched barley on cardiovascular disease risk factors in mildly hypercholesterolemic men." The American journal of clinical nutrition 78, no. 4 (2003): 711–718.
- Buffenstein, Rochelle, Sally D. Poppitt, Regina M. McDevitt, and Andrew M. Prentice. "Food intake and the menstrual cycle: a retrospective analysis, with implications for appetite research." Physiology & behavior 58, no. 6 (1995): 1067–1077.
