= William Sutherland, 18th Earl of Sutherland =

Scottish hereditary peer

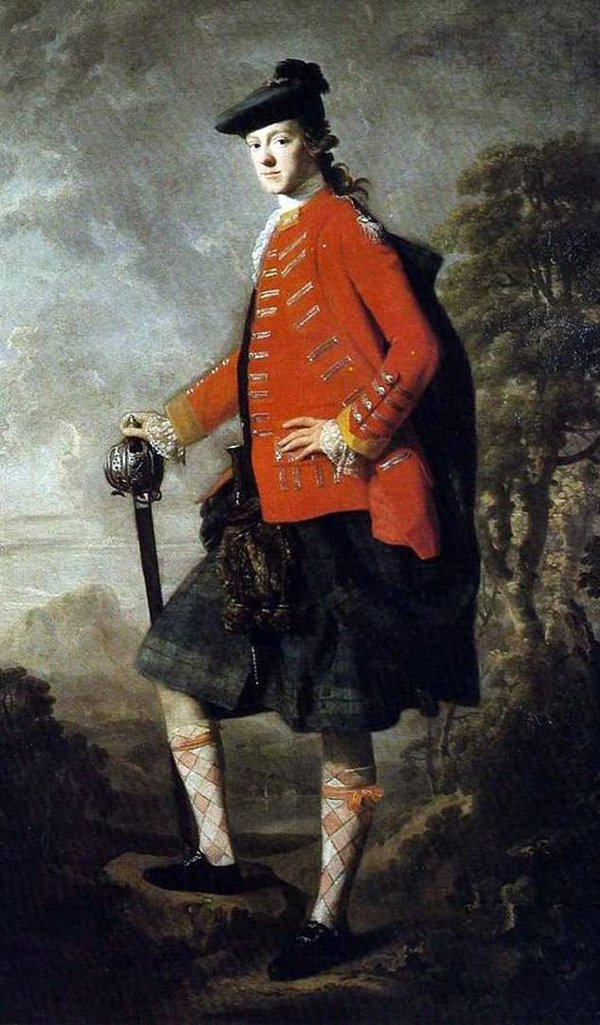
Sutherland in the uniform of a colonel of the Sutherland Fencibles, by Allan Ramsay, 1763

William Sutherland, 18th Earl of Sutherland (1735–1766) was a Scottish hereditary peer.

== Life ==
He was born on 28 May 1735, the son of William Sutherland, 17th Earl of Sutherland and his wife Lady Elizabeth Wemyss.

In 1759, as a captain in the 56th Regiment of Foot he raised a regiment, the original Sutherland Fencibles, from his own Clan Sutherland, to resist the threatened invasion from France.

In the summer of 1761, at the house of Lord Alva in Mylnes Square in Edinburgh, he married sixteen year old Mary Maxwell of Reston (b.1745) in Kirkcudbright, the daughter of the late William Maxwell (1711-1760) and his wife Elizabeth Hairstares (who had remarried Charles Erskine, Lord Tinwald a.k.a. Lord Alva). Her sister Wilhelmina married John Campbell, Lord Glenorchy.

The couple attended the coronation of George III in London on 22 September 1761, and all remarked on the beauty of his wife.

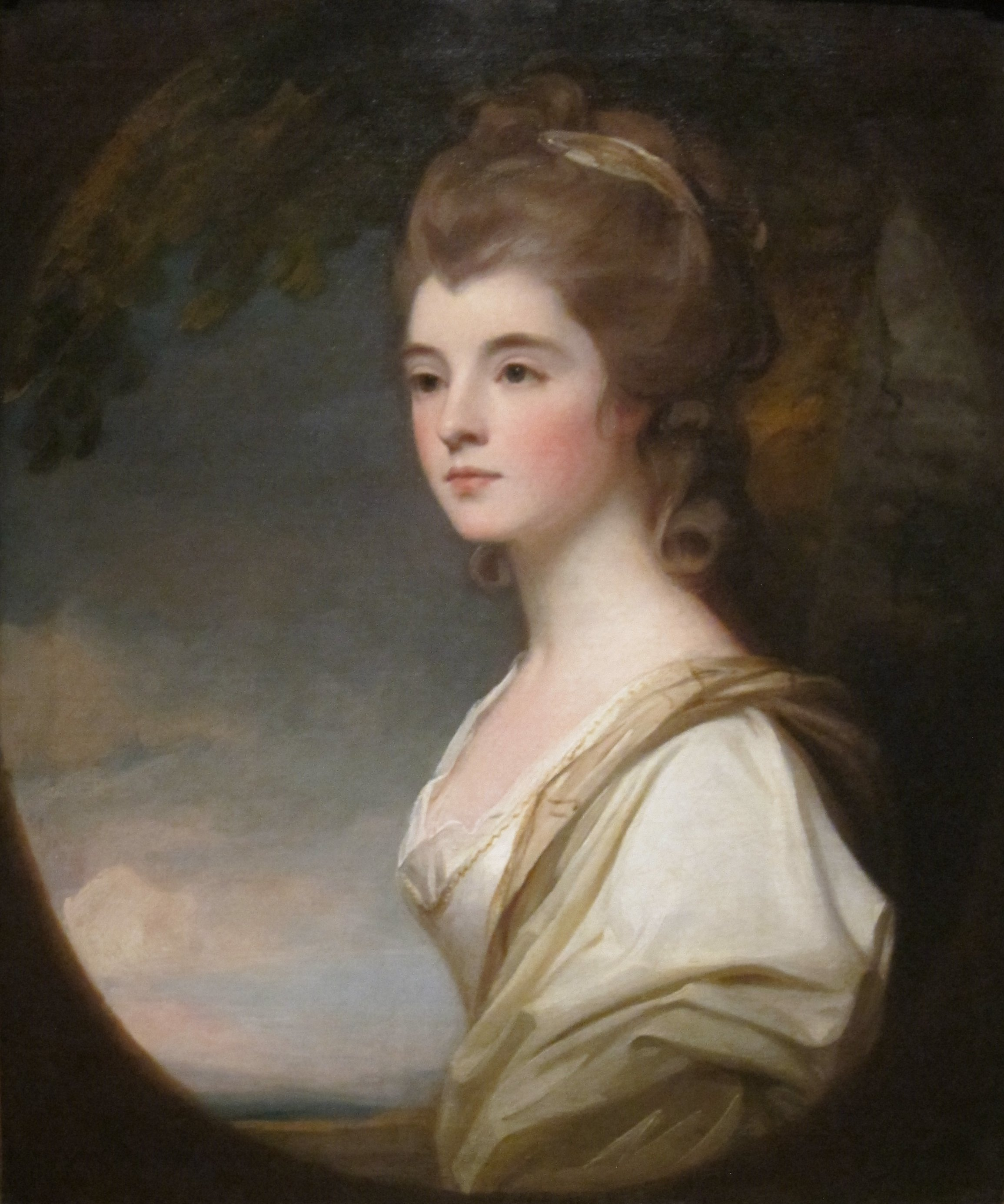
Elizabeth, Duchess-Countess of Sutherland by George Romney

In May 1765, they had a daughter Elizabeth (19th Countess of Sutherland, later Duchess of Sutherland) whom William dropped on her head whilst playing, causing serious and permanent injury.

William became very ill and went to Bath to recover. The countess visited him there for 21 days (whilst pregnant with a second child). She caught the same fever and died on 1 June 1766. He was not told of her death. He died of malignant fever a few days later on 16 June 1766. He seemed to know his wife was dead, and his last words were "I am going to join my own dear wife".

The couple were buried together in a single ceremony in the family plot in Holyrood Abbey in Edinburgh on 9 August 1766.

== Trivia ==
A pair of flintlock pistols gifted by William in his role as commander of the 56th Foot to Captain James Sutherland in 1763 sold for £44,000 in 2021.

Peerage of Scotland
| Preceded by William Sutherland | Earl of Sutherland; 1750–1766 | Succeeded by Elizabeth Leveson-Gower |
