= Lucky Street =

Lucky Street may refer to:

== Places ==
- Lucky Street, Beijing
- Lucky Street Gallery, Key West, Florida, exhibiting artists such as Phyllis Rose and Kue King

== Music ==
- Lucky Street (album) by Go Radio 2011
