= Cycling at the 2010 Asian Games – Women's cross-country =

Women's cross-country at the 2010 Asian Games
- Venue: Dafushan Mountain Bike Course
- Date: 18 November 2010
- Competitors: 8 from 6 nations

Medalists
gold medal	Ren Chengyuan	China
silver medal	Shi Qinglan	China
bronze medal	Rie Katayama	Japan

The women's cross-country competition at the 2010 Asian Games in Guangzhou was held on 19 November at the Dafushan Mountain Bike Course. The race was 32.4 kilometers long and began with a mass start. and involved six laps around the 5.4 kilometers.

== Schedule ==
All times are China Standard Time (UTC+08:00)

Date	Time	Event
Thursday, 18 November 2010	10:00	Final

== Results ==
Rank	Athlete	Time
1st place, gold medalist(s)	Ren Chengyuan (CHN)	1:46:35
2nd place, silver medalist(s)	Shi Qinglan (CHN)	1:53:07
3rd place, bronze medalist(s)	Rie Katayama (JPN)	2:01:15
4	Choi Hye-kyeong (KOR)	2:05:13
5	Yukari Nakagome (JPN)	2:06:10
6	Masziyaton Mohd Radzi (MAS)	−4 laps
7	Nguyễn Thanh Đàm (VIE)	−4 laps
8	Nirjala Tamrakar (NEP)	−5 laps
