= Wire sculpture =

Creating sculpture & jewelry with wire

Wire sculpture is the creation of sculpture out of wire. The use of metal wire in jewelry dates back to the 2nd Dynasty in Egypt and to the Bronze and Iron Ages in Europe. In the 20th century, the works of Alexander Calder, Ruth Asawa, and other modern practitioners developed the medium of wire sculpture as an art form.

== Alexander Calder ==
Alexander Calder (July 22,1898–November 11,1976), an American sculptor, greatly developed the use of wire as a medium for sculpture with his kinetic and movement-based Cirque Calder, as well as pieces such as Two Acrobats, Romulus and Remus, and Hercules and Lion.

In 1926, after a stint spent making toys at the request of a Serbian toy merchant in Paris, Calder began creating his Cirque Calder, a miniature, movable circus that uses movable wire models of various circus performers, like sword eaters and lion tamers. After this, Calder created complete pieces only using wire and in 1927 had a show of wire sculptures at the Weyhe Gallery in New York City. In 1930, he had a solo show of wire sculptures in Paris, at Galerie Billiet.

Calder’s wire sculptures of this period tended to be portraits, caricatures, and stylized representations of people and animals. While originally believing the medium of wire sculpture to be merely clever and amusing, as his work developed, he began to state that wire sculpture had an important place in the history of art and remarked on the great possibilities within the medium.“These new studies in wire, however, did not remain the simple, modest little things I had done in New York. They are still simple, more simple than before, and therein lie the great possibilities which I have only recently come to feel for the wire medium... There is one thing, in particular, which connects them with history. One of the futuristic painters' canons, as propounded by Modigliani, was that objects should not be lost to view but should be shown through the others by making the latter transparent. The wire sculpture accomplishes this in a most decided manner!"

== Ruth Asawa ==
Ruth Asawa came to prominence when her wire sculptures appeared at both the Whitney Museum of American Art and the 1955 São Paulo Art Biennial. Asawa learned to use commonplace materials from Josef Albers, her teacher at Black Mountain College, and began experimenting with wire using a variety of techniques.

In the 1950s, Asawa experimented with crocheted wire sculptures of abstract forms that appear as three dimensional line drawings. She learned the basic technique while in Toluca, Mexico, where villagers used a similar technique to make baskets from galvanized wire.

“I was interested in it because of the economy of a line, making something in space, enclosing it without blocking it out. It’s still transparent. I realized that if I was going to make these forms, which interlock and interweave, it can only be done with a line because a line can go anywhere.”

In 1962, Asawa began experimenting with tied wire sculptures of images rooted in nature, geometry, and abstraction.

== Contemporary practitioners ==
Contemporary wire artists include:

- Brian Boyer uses wire that would otherwise end up in a landfill to create wire trees. Known for his self-taught style and use of recycled copper/aluminum wire. His trees combine mathematical formulas, algorithms, and equations along with geometric shapes along with flowers and many other abstract patterns in the roots and branches. As of 2018 Brian has had an active profile with the "Canadian Council for the Arts" and continues to make his one of a kind wire trees under the brand name "Forrest Wire"
- Gavin Worth has used wire sculpture to combine realistic images with 3-d abstract forms. Worth approached Calder's idea of mobility in sculpture by making the viewer the mobile element. By placing varying images on different planes of the sculpture, the image changes as the viewer see it from different angles.
- Kue King has built a reputation combining wire and feather. He sculpts wire using a woven additive technique. Instead of creating a form with wireframing, he builds with it like clay.
- Elizabeth Berrien began working with wire in the 1960s and is hailed as the "Godmother of Wire" by the wave of emerging wire sculptors she inspired.
- Racso Jugarap works speak of organic volume and fluidity. Other than wire sculpture and installations, the artist also experiments with wearable wire arts.

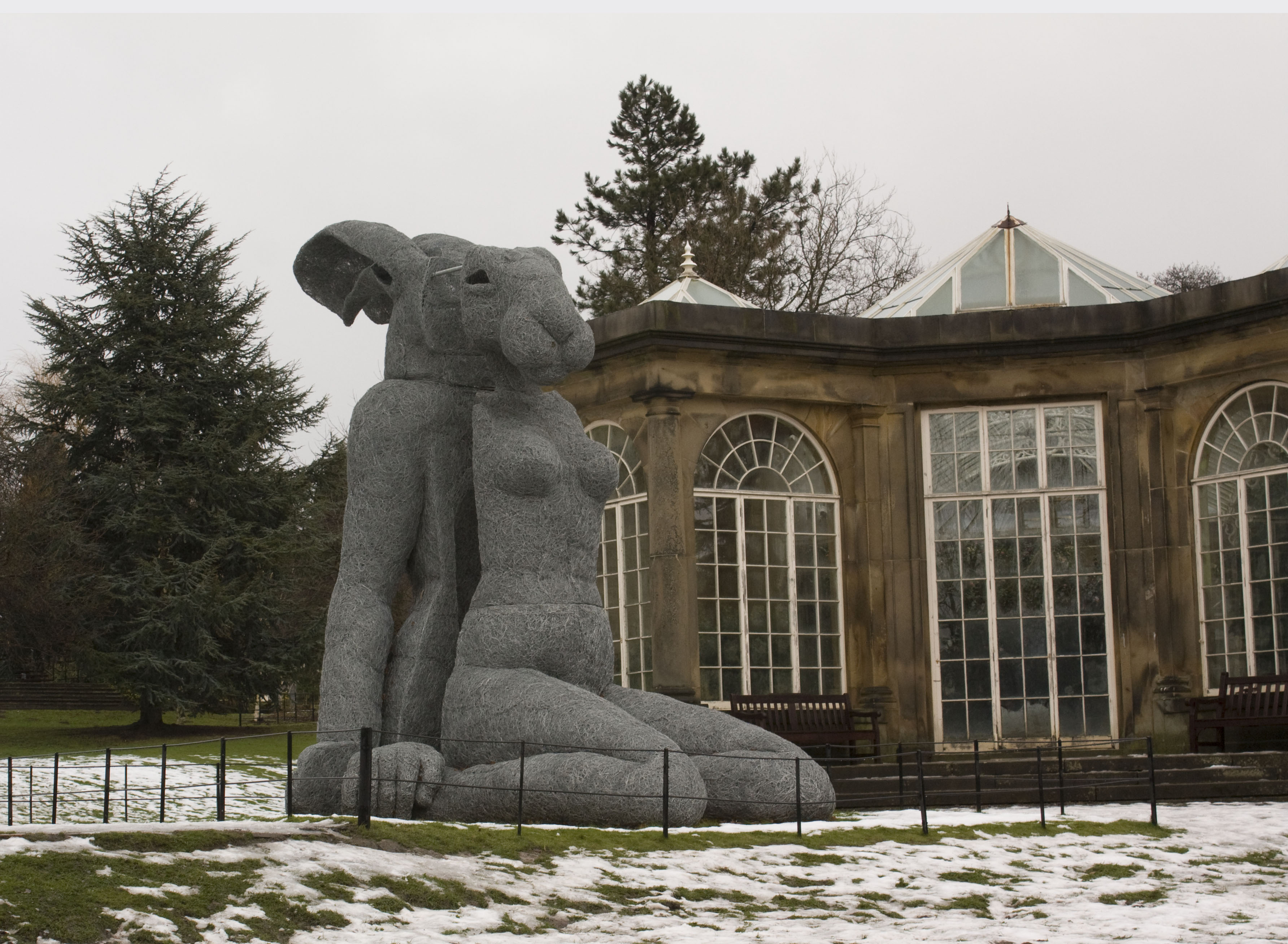
Sophie Ryder 's galvanized wire sculpture Sitting at the Yorkshire Sculpture Park

- Robin Wight creates wire sculptures of fairies. He works with stainless steel wire. One of his more notable works is Dancing with Dandelions

== See also ==
- Art jewelry
- Bronze and brass ornamental work
- Jewelry wire
