= 24 Hours of Adrenalin =

24 Hours of Adrenalin is a mountain bike event series in North America. In 2005, over 10,000 enthusiasts participated. 24 Hours of Adrenalin claims the title of "fastest growing mountain bike event series in North America". It revolves around a massive relay race, where solo riders or teams of up to ten people compete to ride as many laps as possible in 24-hours, though participants are only required to complete one lap. The race generally favors speed over technical skill and begins with a 600-metre Le Mans start to retrieve bikes. In addition to placings, awards are presented for Best Theme and Best Helmet. First place winners in each category receive a jersey and medal, while other finalists receive prizes donated by sponsors.

The race takes place annually in various cities including:

- Idyllwild, California
- Monterey, California
- Canmore, Alberta
- Conyers, Georgia (discontinued venue as of approx 2008)

In 2010 the 12th annual World Solo 24 Hour MTB Championships was held outside of North America for the first time, at Mount Stromlo, Canberra, Australia.

It appears 24 Hours of Adrenalin went out of business after their last 2017 event with venue fees at Canmore Nordic Centre being blamed as the cause.

== See also ==
- Mountain bike racing
- 24 Hour Mountain Bike Races
- Sleepless in the Saddle
- Mountain Mayhem
