= MTB Himalaya =

Annual mountain bike race in India

Race details
- Date: 27 September – 6 October 2018
- Region: Himachal Pradesh, India
- Discipline: Mountain Biking
- Type: Cross Country
- Organiser: HASTPA
- Web site: www.mtbhimalaya.com

History
- First edition: 2005 to Present
- Editions: 15th edition of MTB Himalaya
- Most wins: Adria Nougera, Team Buff Scott
- Most recent: Cory Wallace, Luis Leao Pinto, Ajay Pandit, Nirjala Tamrakar, Jason English, Adrian Nougera

The MTB Himalaya is an annual mountain bike race held in the mountainous state of Himachal Pradesh, India. Started in 2005, the race covers nearly 650 km (400 mi) 16500 metres of climbing at an average altitude of 2200 meters in a span of 8 days and is one of the toughest MTB stage races in the world. The race is sponsored by Hero Cycles and Himachal tourism .

== Venues ==
Started in 2005, the first 5 races took the route from Shimla To Manali. In 2010, the route was changed and a loop was taken where the race began and finished from Shimla. It passes through Shimla, Kullu and Mandi districts.

In 2016, the route was once again changed from Shimla to Dharamshala and since then the race has been also called as ride to Land of Lamas.

== Categories of Competition ==
The race has had the following categories for cyclists

- Men Solo
- Women Solo
- Masters Solo (age 40 and above)
- Teams of Two
- Grandmasters Solo

== Sponsors ==
Since 2014, the event has been sponsored by Hero Cycles and UT Bikes. In the recent events Discovery channel, Sportskeeda and The Times of India officially partnered the MTB Himalaya as media partners.

In 2017, Coleman India joined hands with the race as official outdoor partner.

The International Mountain Bicycling Association has been a race partner with MTB Himalaya from the beginning.

== Participation ==
The Hero MTB Himalaya has seen about 1500 riders take part in the 14 years of existence. They have seen participants come from US, Austria, Germany, Nepal, Bhutan and India. In 2011, 104 riders started, and only 42 finished.
