= 24-hour race =

24-hour race may refer to:

- 24 hour mountain bike races
- 24-hour run, a form of ultramarathon
- Endurance racing (motorsport)
- Southport 24 Hour Race
