= Wireframe =

Wireframe or wire-frame may refer to:

- Wire-frame model, visual model of a three-dimensional object in computer graphics
- Website wireframe, a basic visual guide used in web design
- Wireframe, a video game development magazine published by Raspberry Pi Foundation from 2018 to 2023.

== See also ==
- Wire sculpture, used in plastic arts
