= Mountain Mayhem =

24-hour mountain bike race held in the UK

Coordinates: 52.038°N 2.378°W

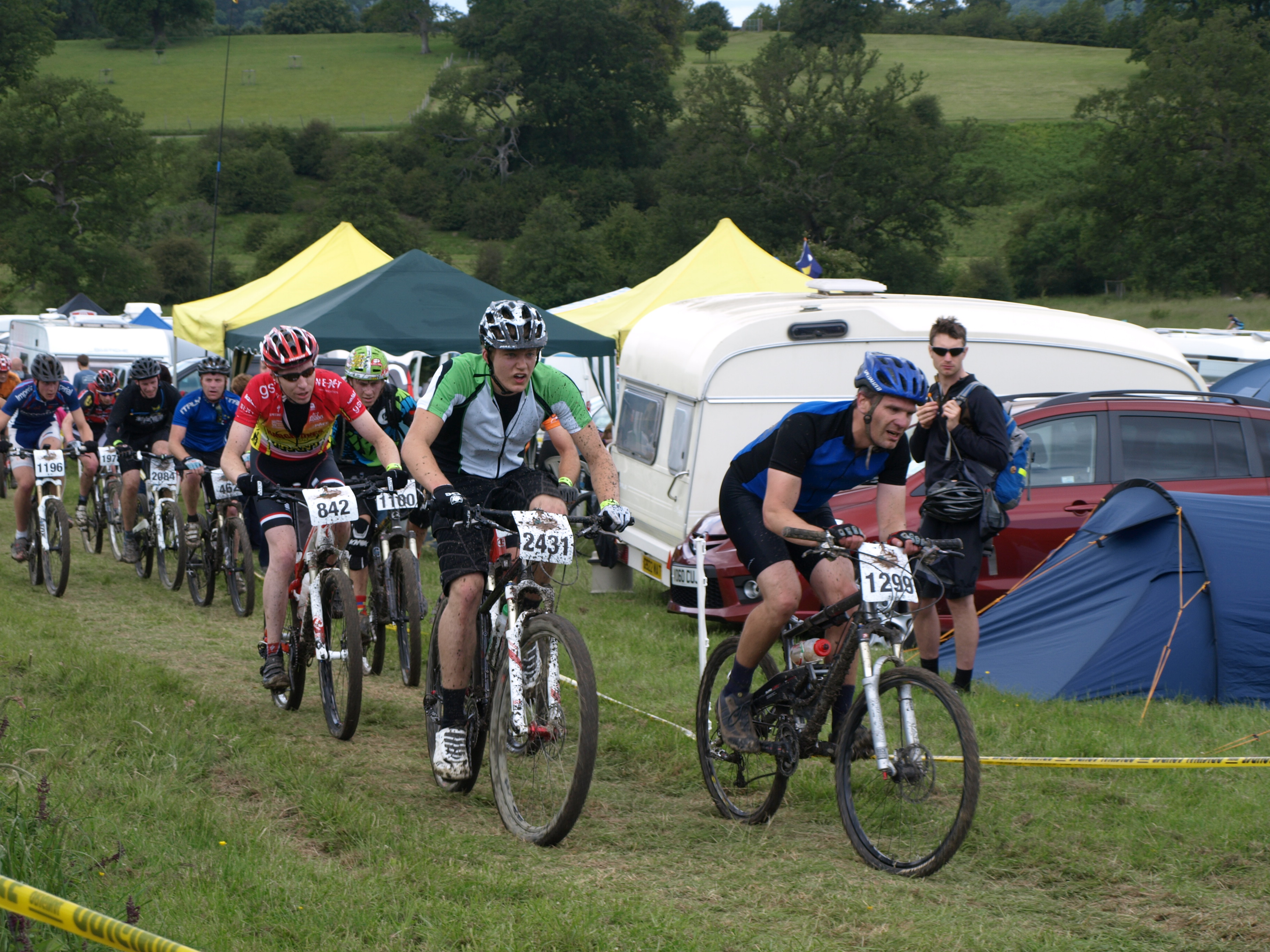

Race details
- Date: 19–21 June
- Region: UK Northamptonshire
- Discipline: Mountain
- Type: 24 Hour

History
- First edition: 1998
- Editions: 22
- Most recent: 2019 Martin Handley, Dorothy Liviabella

Mountain Mayhem is a 24-hour mountain bike race held in the UK. It has been held annually since 1998 and usually occurs on the weekend nearest to midsummer. In 2013 the event moved to Gatcombe Park in Gloucestershire, and in 2019 the event was held at Marston Lodge in rural Northamptonshire.

== History ==
=== Levels of competition ===
The race has always had categories for teams in men/women/mixed. A solo category was introduced in 2000, with eight invited solo racers in 2000 and increasing numbers of solo entries each following year. The latest race, had nearly 900 racers on the course.

- Individual Male
- Individual Female
- Mixed Expert
- Mixed
- Open Men
- Open Women
- Sport Men
- Sport Women
- Tens

and the following subcategories:

- Guests
- Services
- Singlespeed
- University
- Veteran

=== Venues ===
The first Mountain Mayhem took place in 1998 at Trentham Gardens, Staffordshire. In 1999 the race moved to Sandwell Park Farm in the Sandwell Valley Country Park, West Midlands. In 2004 the race moved to the Deer Park of Eastnor Castle in Herefordshire where the course used a nine-mile loop. In 2009 the race saw an estimated crowd of 15,000 spectators. For 2013 it moved to a new location less than 40 miles from Eastnor on private land which has never been used for cycling before, Gatcombe Park in Gloucestershire. In 2019 the race moved to a private location in the center of the country with a new course with much climbing and great singletrack.

=== Sponsors ===
Between 1998 and 2002 it was sponsored by Red Bull. Between 2003 and 2006 it was sponsored by Saab and Salomon. For 2007 it was sponsored by Giant and T-Mobile. For 2008 it was sponsored by Giant. Between 2009 and 2011 it was sponsored by Original Source, a PZ Cussons brand. Between 2012 and 2014 it was sponsored by Wiggle (an online cycle shop based in the UK). In 2015 it was sponsored by Go Outdoors (a camping and outdoor sports chain). In 2019 the race was sponsored by Cycle Surgery, Osprey packs, WD40, Fibrax, Cuda Bikes, Continental and Niterider lights

== Weather ==
The race has recently had a reputation for wet weather (sharing similar weather to the Glastonbury Festival which it often coincides with).

From the first event in 1998 the race suffered from very heavy rain and the course became very wet and slippery. Many of the subsequent years were also wet although most of them didn't experience rain on both days of the event.

The run up to the 2003 event was characterized by very dry conditions and the race was held in record temperatures leading to fears about dehydration for riders and warnings to teams to ensure riders drank enough water.

The move in 2004 to the Malverns (and its heavy clay soil) was accompanied by heavy rain throughout the race with many riders abandoning the race due to the adverse conditions and leaving many riders questioning the choice of the new venue.

Questions over the venue remained at the start of the following years race, which started in heavy rain with fears of a repeated "mudfest", however despite heavy rain at the start of the race continuing into the evening the rain cleared overnight to provide a dry and sunny end to the race.

2006 provided a break for rain- and mud-weary riders with dry and hot conditions throughout the weekend. The Eastnor Castle course, which in the previous years rain had clogged bikes and caused wheels to slide and slip, was suddenly fast and dusty providing very competitive and enjoyable racing conditions.

Both 2007 and 2008 however saw a return to the rain and heavy mud with the 2008 summer being the "wettest summer on record" provided particularly atrocious conditions in heavy downpours of rain.

For 2009 the weather was wet on Friday, but dried up for the start of the race on Saturday.

In 2010 the weather was dry and sunny for the whole event. Dust and sunburn were the main risks to the riders.

In 2011 the race started in damp conditions but as the event unfolded the conditions improved giving perfect conditions for mountain bike racing.

In the run up to the 2012 event, southern England suffered from exceptionally heavy rain fall that saturated the ground. From Friday onwards the whole event was plagued by torrential downpours and strong winds. Consequently, most of the track, the main arena and the campsite deteriorated into the notorious "mudfest". Given the conditions, the organizers declared that each team member only needed to complete a minimum of one lap to qualify for a placing (normally a minimum of two laps are required) and that teams retiring early (i.e. before the full 24 hours had elapsed) would be placed according to the number of laps.

== Participation ==
This race is open to all who wish to ride to in it, subject to available space. The 2009 race saw an estimated 2,500 riders. According to Pat Adams, the former organizer of the event,

Since its beginning back in 1998, the event has grown and developed over the years to become the biggest 24-hour mountain bike endurance event worldwide.

Competitors may enter individually or in teams of four, five, or ten.

Commenting on the race, organiser Jill Greenfield said, "We couldn’t be more pleased with the reaction to our 21st edition. Marston Lodge provided the perfect backdrop and the beautiful weather topped off a great comeback weekend. We can also confirm the date of our 22nd edition as 19, 20 and 21 June 2020 again at Marston Lodge. Details for entries will be released as soon as possible."

== See also ==
- Mountain bike racing
- 24 hour mountain bike races
- Sleepless in the Saddle
- 24 Hours of Adrenalin
