= Dancing with Dandelions =

2014 wire sculpture of a fairy

One o'clock Wish
- Dancing with Dandelions
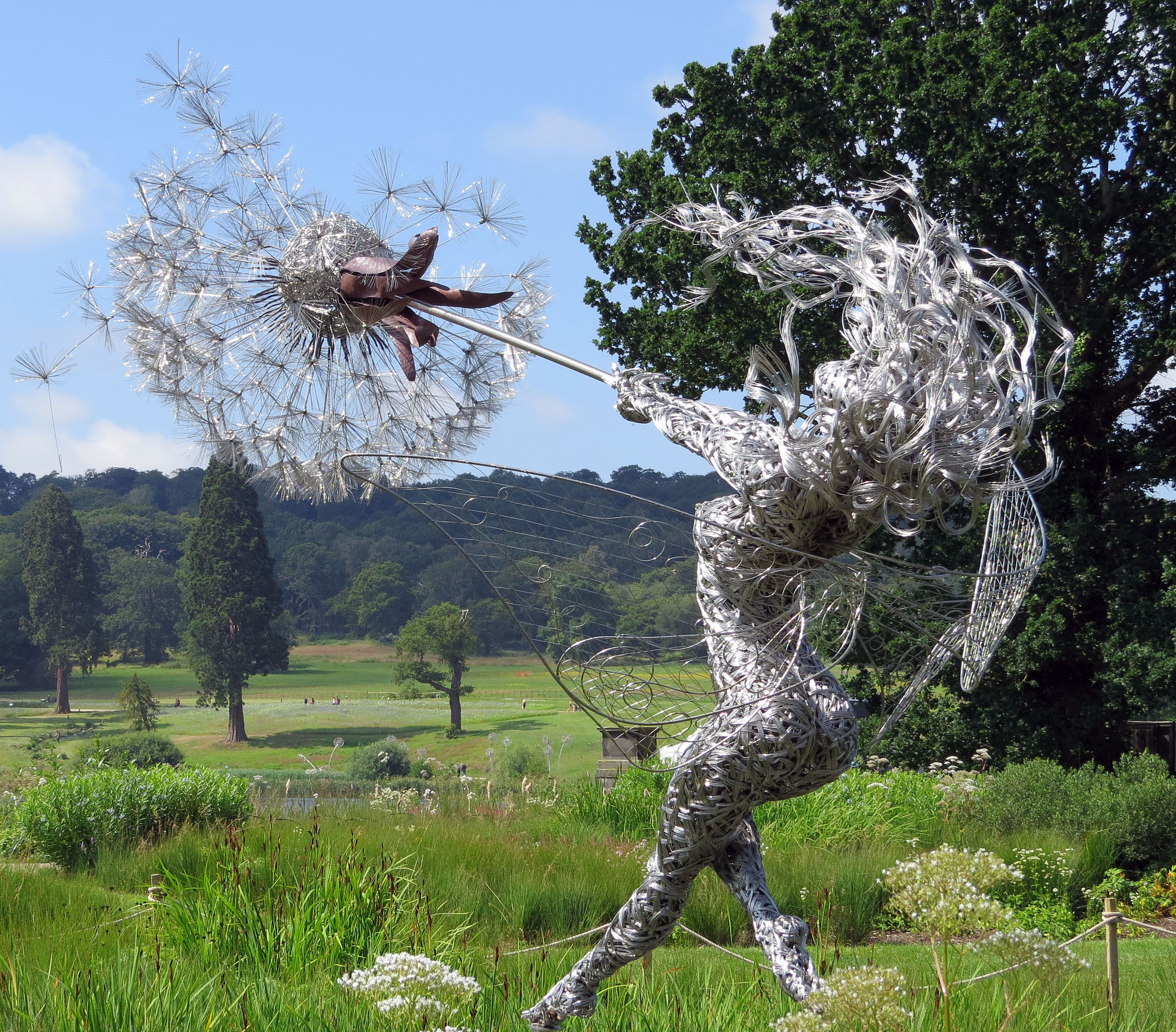
- Dancing with Dandelions by Robin Wight
- Artist: Robin Wight
- Year: 2014
- Medium: Metal, stone and stainless steel wire
- Location: Staffordshire
- Website: Dancing with Dandelions

Dancing with Dandelions or One O'clock Wish is a sculpture depicting a fairy who appears to be fighting the wind while holding a dandelion. It was created by Robin Wight, an artist from Staffordshire. The artist now produces a series of wire sculptures featuring fairies and dandelions.

== History ==
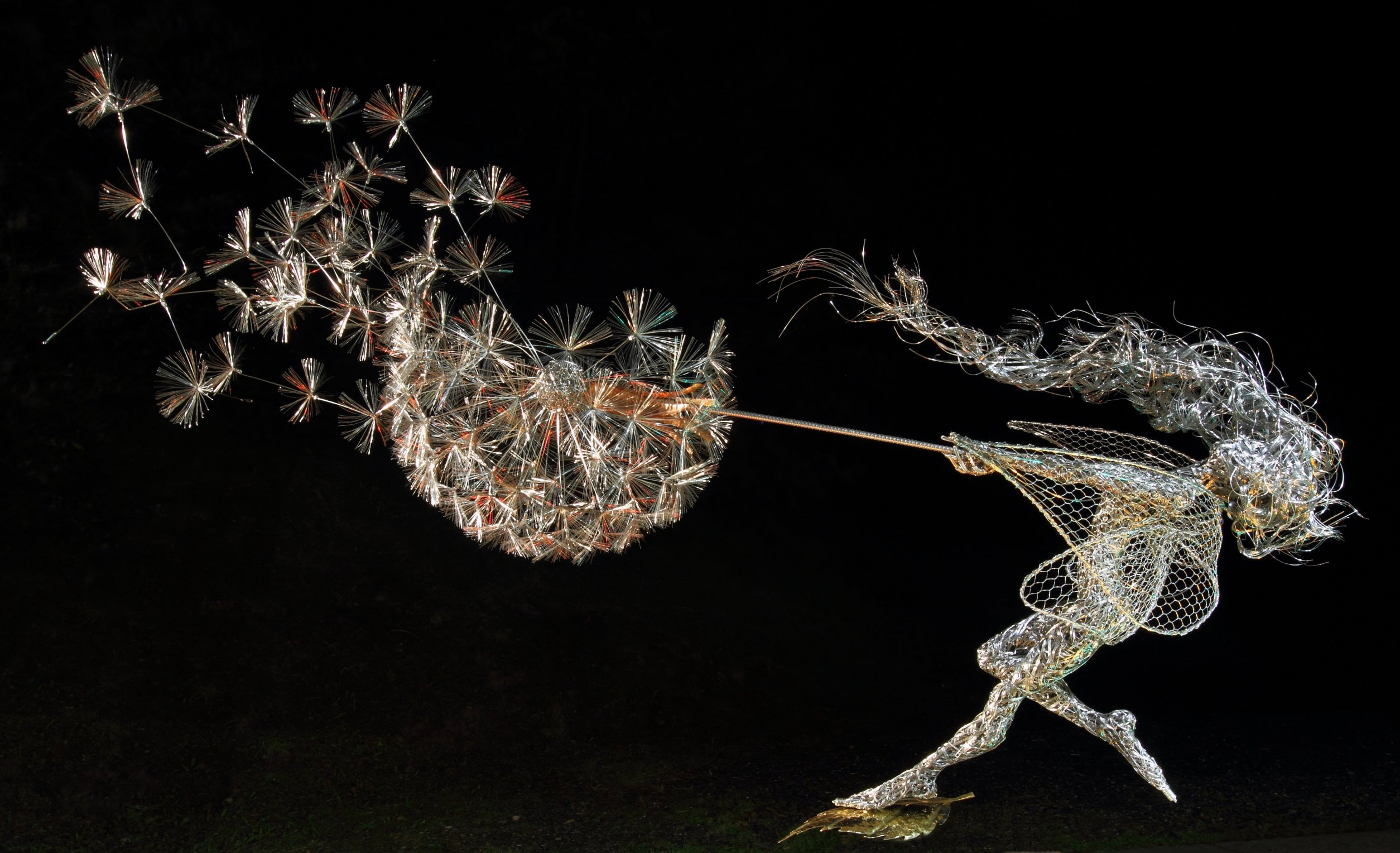
Dancing with Dandelions at night

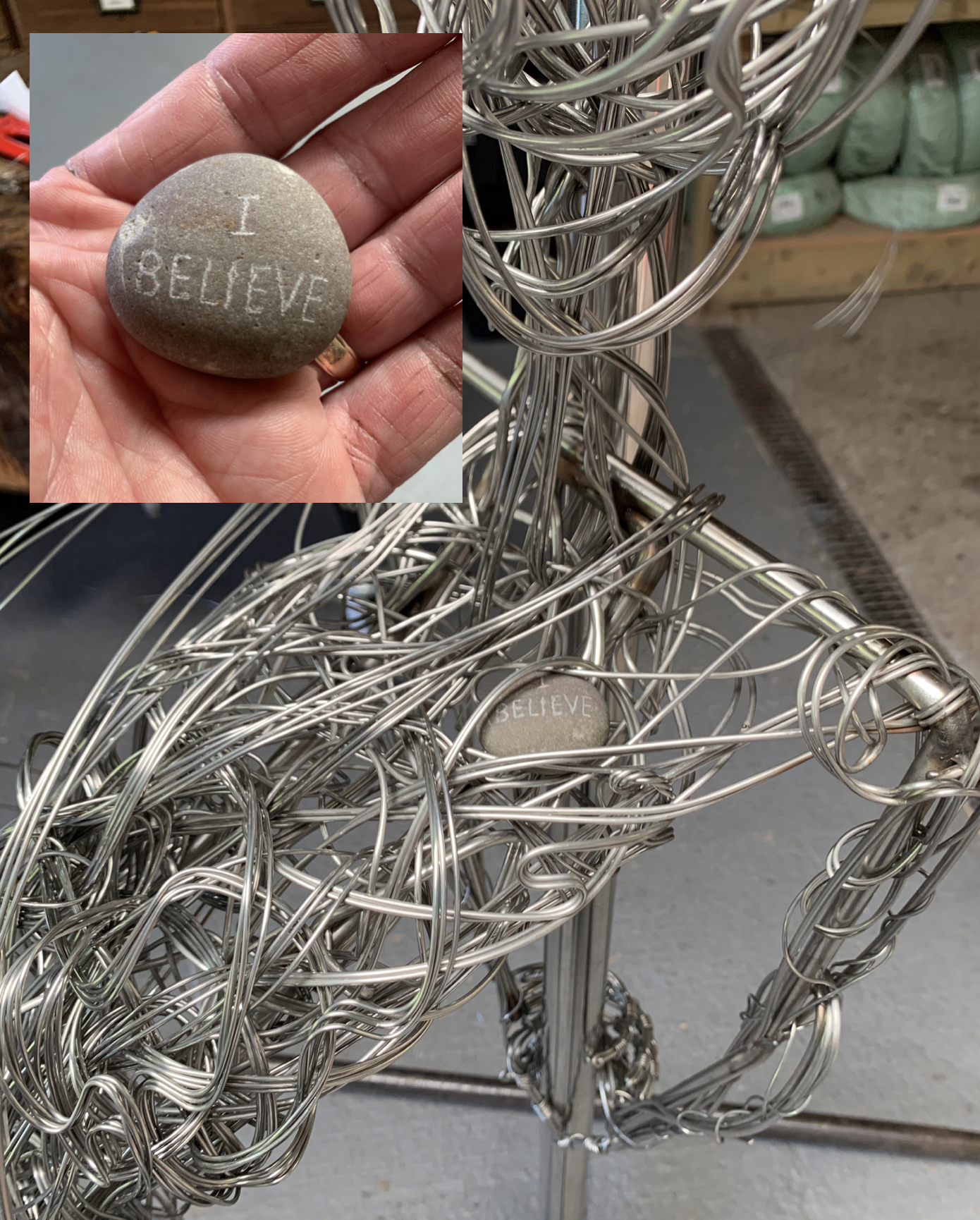
Image of the stone heart inside one fairy sculpture

Robin Wight has created four Dancing with Dandelions sculptures, which he calls "One O'clock Wish". He called it his signature piece and has said it is the most requested sculpture. He claims that a 20 second video of the sculpture he called Living the Dream went viral in 2014.

Wight creates sculptures of fairies with dandelions. In 2011 he began a business called Fantasywire. In his business he creates sculptures from wires. He placed several of his sculptures on a trail in his home town of Stoke-on-Trent, England, and they were spotted by a marketing manager from Trentham Gardens in Stoke-on-Trent. Trentham Gardens then commissioned several of the sculptures. They used the fairies to create a "Fairy Trail" on the grounds to display the Dancing with Dandelions sculptures. In 2014 a visitor shared a photo of one of the sculptures, and Wight's Fantasywire Facebook page swelled to 440,000 followers.

His original sculpture, which was referred to as Dancing with Dandelions (he calls it One O'clock Wish), is his most well-known sculpture.

== Design of fairy series ==
The fairies Wight builds are winged creatures, and they are posed in positions that contort their bodies. The dandelions appear to be blowing in a brisk wind. They are made with stainless steel wire. The design begins with a skeleton of thicker steel, and then different sizes of wires are used to create a lifelike appearance. Each fairy has "realistic anatomy and musculature", which is created from the stainless steel wire. The artist puts a stone inside the sculptures to represent a heart. Occasionally Wight engraves a message on the stone hearts inside the fairies.

== Reception ==
In 2016 Pulse Nigeria published a list of "10 amazing sculptures from around the world". They put the Dancing with Dandelions sculpture as number 9. In 2017 Bored Panda put the sculpture at number 2 on their list of "42 of the Most Amazing Sculptures in the World".
