= UCI Snow Bike World Championships =

World championships for Snow Biking, organized by the UCI

The UCI Snow Bike World Championships are the world championships for Snow Biking, considered a sub discipline of mountain bike racing, organized by the UCI. Starting in 2024, two race formats Super G and Dual slalom are organized on an alpine skiing course.

The UCI awards a gold medal and a rainbow jersey to the winner. Silver and bronze medals are awarded to the second and third place contestants. The participants are also awarded UCI points for mountain bike racing.

== Championships ==
Year	Country	City
2024	France	Châtel
2025	France	Châtel
2026	France	Châtel

== Medalists ==
=== Super G ===
==== Elite Men ====
Year	Gold	Silver	Bronze
2024	Pierre Thévenard (FRA)	Henry Kerr (IRL)	Vincent Tupin (FRA)
2025	Vincent Tupin (FRA)	Pierre Thévenard (FRA)	Cédric Gracia (FRA)
2026	Pierre Thévenard (FRA)	Vincent Tupin (FRA)	Dylan Levesque (FRA)

==== Elite Women ====
Year	Gold	Silver	Bronze
2024	Morgane Such (FRA)	Veronika Widmann (ITA)	Lisa Baumann (SUI)
2025	Lisa Baumann (SUI)	Vicky Clavel (FRA)	Zoé Fayolle (FRA)
2026	Lisa Baumann (SUI)	Vicky Clavel (FRA)	Morgane Such (FRA)

=== Dual slalom ===
==== Elite Men ====
Year	Gold	Silver	Bronze
2024	Pierre Thévenard (FRA)	Vincent Tupin (FRA)	Henry Kerr (IRL)
2025	Léo Grisel (FRA)	Pierre Thévenard (FRA)	Vincent Tupin (FRA)
2026	Vincent Tupin (FRA)	Cédric Gracia (FRA)	Dylan Levesque (FRA)

==== Elite Women ====
Year	Gold	Silver	Bronze
2024	Lisa Baumann (SUI)	Morgane Such (FRA)	Jolanda Kiener (SUI)
2025	Lisa Baumann (SUI)	Zoé Fayolle (FRA)	Morgane Such (FRA)
2026	Lisa Baumann (SUI)	Vicky Clavel (FRA)	Morgane Such (FRA)
