= Robin Wight (artist) =

English artist and sculptor

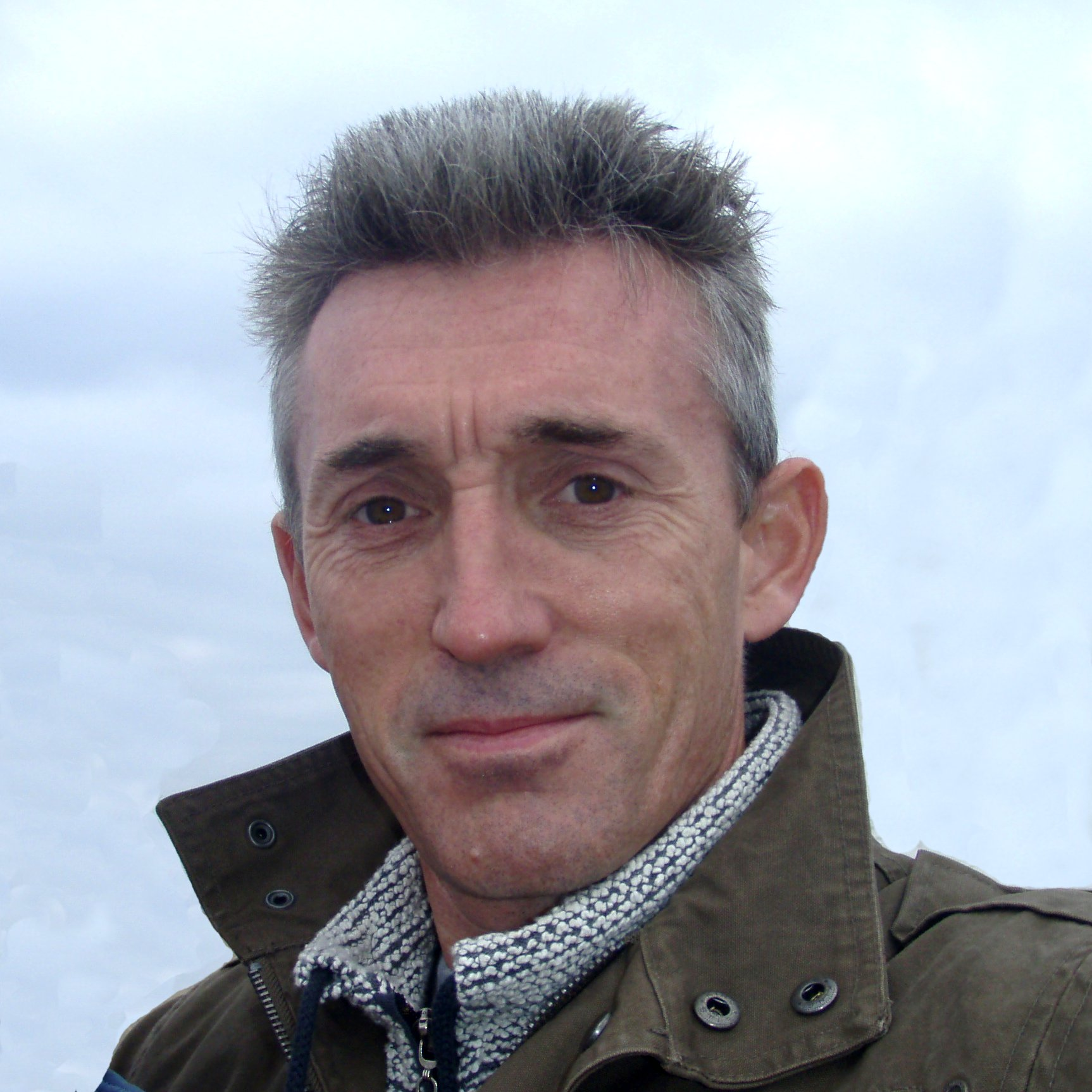
- Born: 1960 (age 64–65)
- Known for: Wire sculpture
- Notable work: Dancing with Dandelions (sculpture)
- Website: Website

Robin Wight (born 1960) is an English artist and sculptor from Stoke-on-Trent, Staffordshire. He is known for creating stainless steel wire sculptures which depict fairies. His best known sculpture is called Dancing with Dandelions.

== Early life ==
According to Wight's website, he was born in 1960 and his father was an engineer. He began drawing in pencil during high school. He was creative throughout his life and began to create three dimensional art in his adult life.

== Career ==
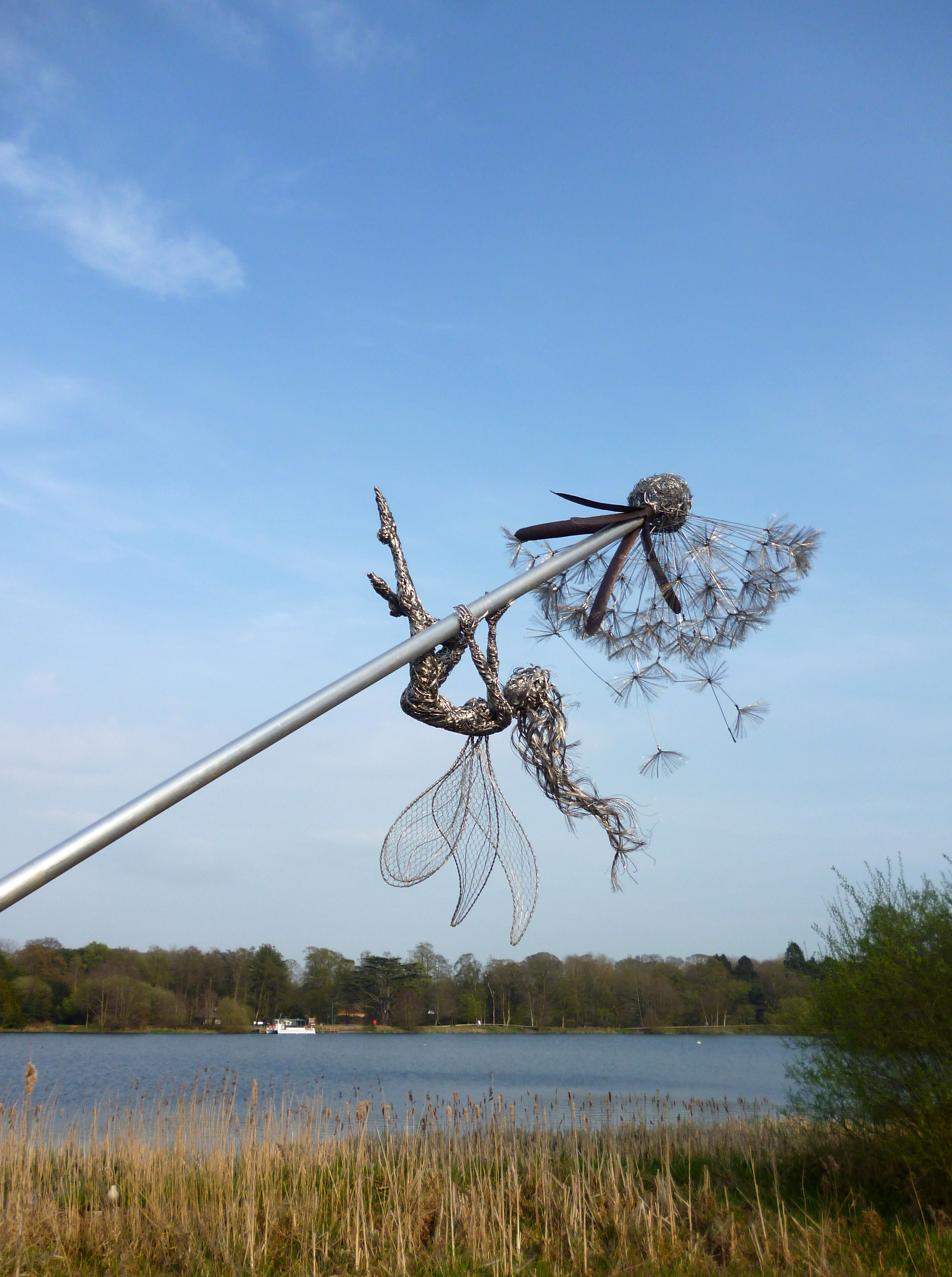
Wire Metal fairy by Robin Wight Trentham Gardens

He has said that he received a camera in 2009, and while he was experimenting with the camera, he took a photo and he saw an apparition of a fairy in the photo. Then in 2010 he was repairing a wire fence and he became interested in the malleable wire. Soon after he created his first fairy with the same galvanized fence wire.

Making fairies began as a hobby for Wight. In 2011 he started a business called FantasyWire. His career began when Amanda Dawson from Trentham Gardens discovered his work. Wight was then commissioned to produce more sculptures for Trentham Gardens. In 2014 a visitor shared a photo of one of the sculptures and Wight's Fantasywire Facebook page swelled to 440,000 followers.

Robin Wight has created four Dancing with Dandelions sculptures, which he calls "One o'clock Wish". He called it his signature piece and has said it is the most requested sculpture. He claims that a 20 second video of the sculpture he called Living the Dream went viral in 2014.
