= Sleepless in the Saddle =

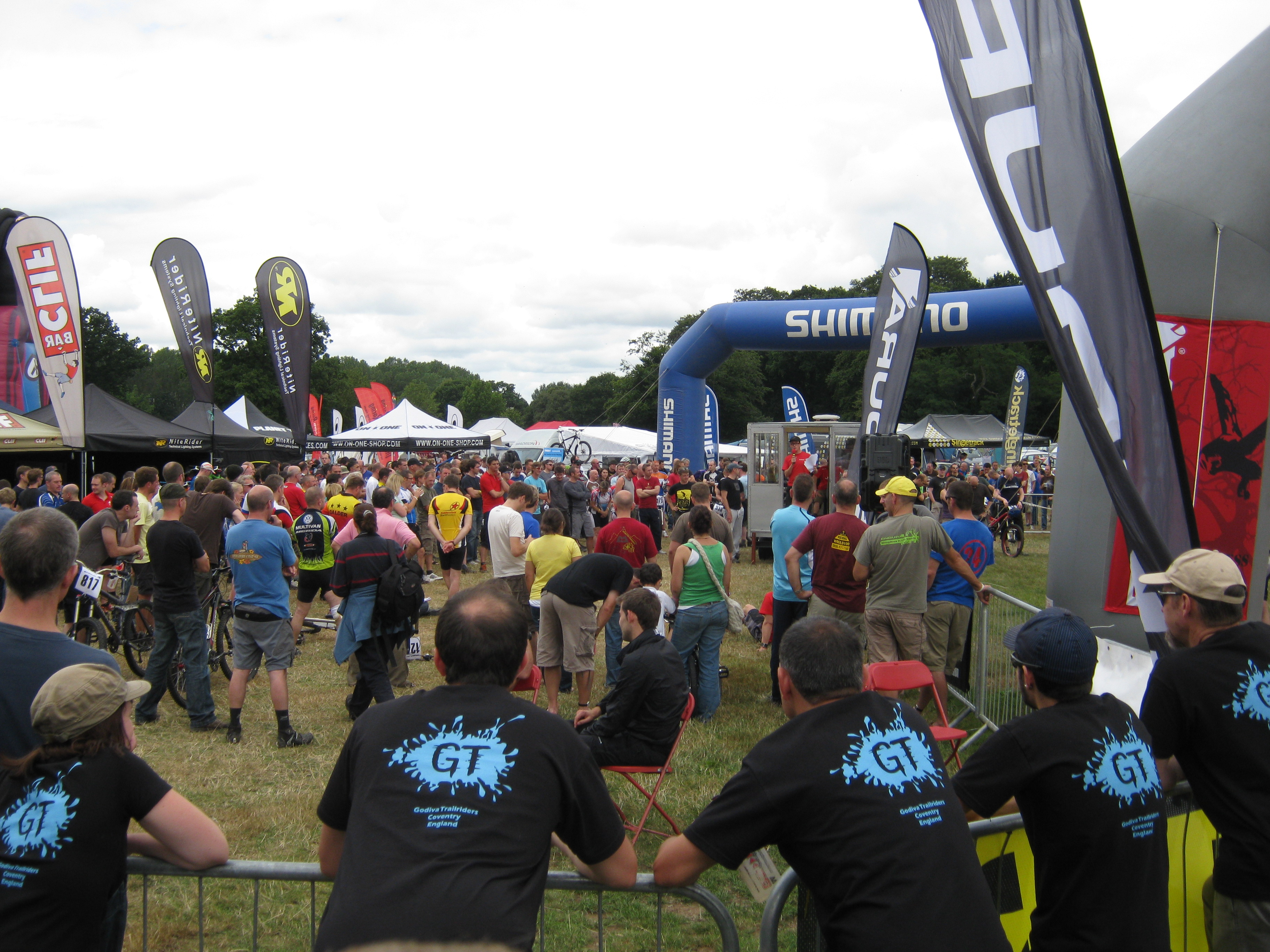
The pre-race riders meeting at the 2010 event (photo 2010)

Sleepless in the Saddle (SITS) was a series of 24-hour mountain bike races held in the UK, Australia and the USA. The format of the race allowed entries to either be from solo riders, or by teams of varying sizes who rode in relay. It was an endurance event based on cross-country tracks. The winner of the race was the person, or team, who covered the greatest distance in the 24 hours.

From 2005 to 2007 the event became part of the Kona Global Series. The races were held in the USA, UK, and Australia. Sleepless in the Saddle races have been held at Catton Park and Trentham Gardens.

== History ==
The first race was held in the UK in 2001 at Trentham Gardens. The UK races moved to Catton Park in 2005. The race became part of a series in 2005 with additional rounds in the USA and Australia. The Kona Global Series lasted from 2005 to 2007. The race was last held in 2012.

The 2006 US Race was held at Snow Mountain Ranch, Granby, Colorado. The 2007 US race was cancelled. The 2006 Australian Race was held at Redesdale, Victoria.

== Sponsors ==
From 2005, the UK race was sponsored by Kona, having previously been sponsored by Shimano. The race sponsor for 2008, 2009 and 2010 was Endura, a cycle clothing manufacturer based in Livingston, Scotland. For 2011 Singletrack magazine was the headline sponsor.

The Australian race sponsor from 2006 to 2009 was Kona. The 2010 Australian Race was sponsored by Jeep.

== See also ==
- Mountain bike racing
- Mountain Mayhem
- 24 Hours of Adrenalin
