= 24 hour mountain bike races =

Solo endurance mountain bike competitions

24 hour mountain bike races are a form of endurance mountain bike racing where solo competitors or teams race for a period of 24 hours. The 24 Hours of Canaan (13–14 July 1992) was one of the first sanctioned 24 hour mountain bike events. At the 24 Hours of Indiglo (later renamed 24 Hours of Adrenalin) 17-year-old Ed Hunt became the first solo competitor at a 24-hour mountain bike event.

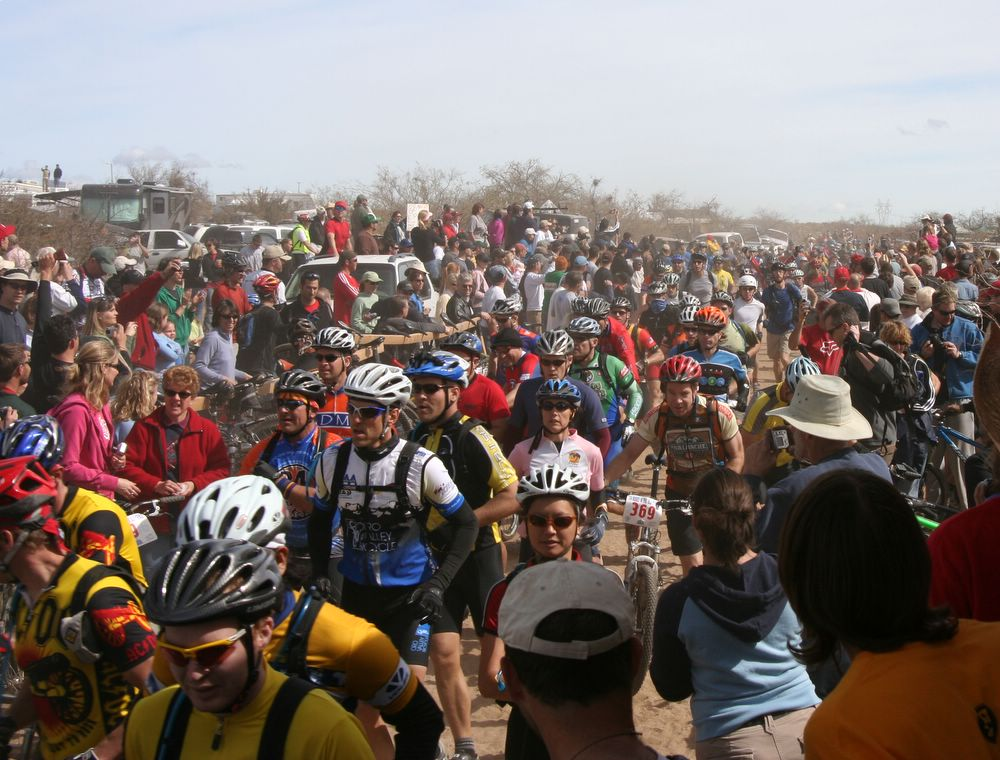
Racers participating in a 24-hour mountain bike race

These races attract a wide variety of riders from elite professional racers, experienced non-professional racers to amateurs. Because the races are typically held in the countryside, racers usually camp on the site. Sometimes racers may arrive several days ahead of time, to claim a good camping spot, preview the course or acclimatise to altitude. As a result, many of them also have a festival component to them including side events, catering and trade stands.

24-hour racing was originally conceived as a team sport, with two or more riders in male, female or mixed teams, taking turns to complete laps of the course. During the night, racers use lighting systems to negotiate the course.

24 Hours of Adrenalin held their last world solo 24 hour championships in 2010 and there was no world solo 24 hour championships in 2011. A new organisation WEMBO was founded to continue solo 24 hour mountain biking at world level and WEMBO have held both continental and world solo 24 hour mountain bike championships since 2012. WEMBO World championships have been held in Italy(2) Australia, Scotland(2) USA, New Zealand and Brasil. Australia was to host again in 2020 and then 2021. However, there were no WEMBO World Solo 24 Championships in 2020 and 2021 due to the travel restrictions as a result of the COVID-19 pandemic. The 2022 WEMBO World Solo 24 Hour Mountain Bike Championships will be held in Finale Ligure, Italy 27–29 May 2022.

The current reigning (2019) WEMBO World champions are Cory Wallace (CAN) and Gaia Ravaioli (ITA). Jason English (AUS) is the rider with the most world solo 24 hour championship titles with 7. Jessica Douglas (AUS) has 3 world solo 24 hour championship titles.

== Scoring ==
There are two alternative methods of determining the winner.

The usual winner is the team or rider that completes the most laps with the first lap after the clock has ticked over 24 hours counting to the result, i.e.

- Team A covers 23 laps in 24:03:06
- Team B covers 24 laps in 24:12:09
- Team C covers 24 laps in 24:45:23

The ranking would be:

- 1st: Team B
- 2nd: Team C
- 3rd: Team A

Some races end the race at 24 hours and it is the team with the most laps in the 24 hours that wins, i.e.

- Team A covers 23 laps in 23:50:55
- Team B covers 23 laps in 23:58:12

The ranking would be:

- 1st: Team A
- 2nd: Team B

== See also ==
- 24 Hours of Adrenalin
- Mountain Mayhem
- Sleepless in the Saddle
