= Trentham Estate =

Estate and gardens in England

Trentham
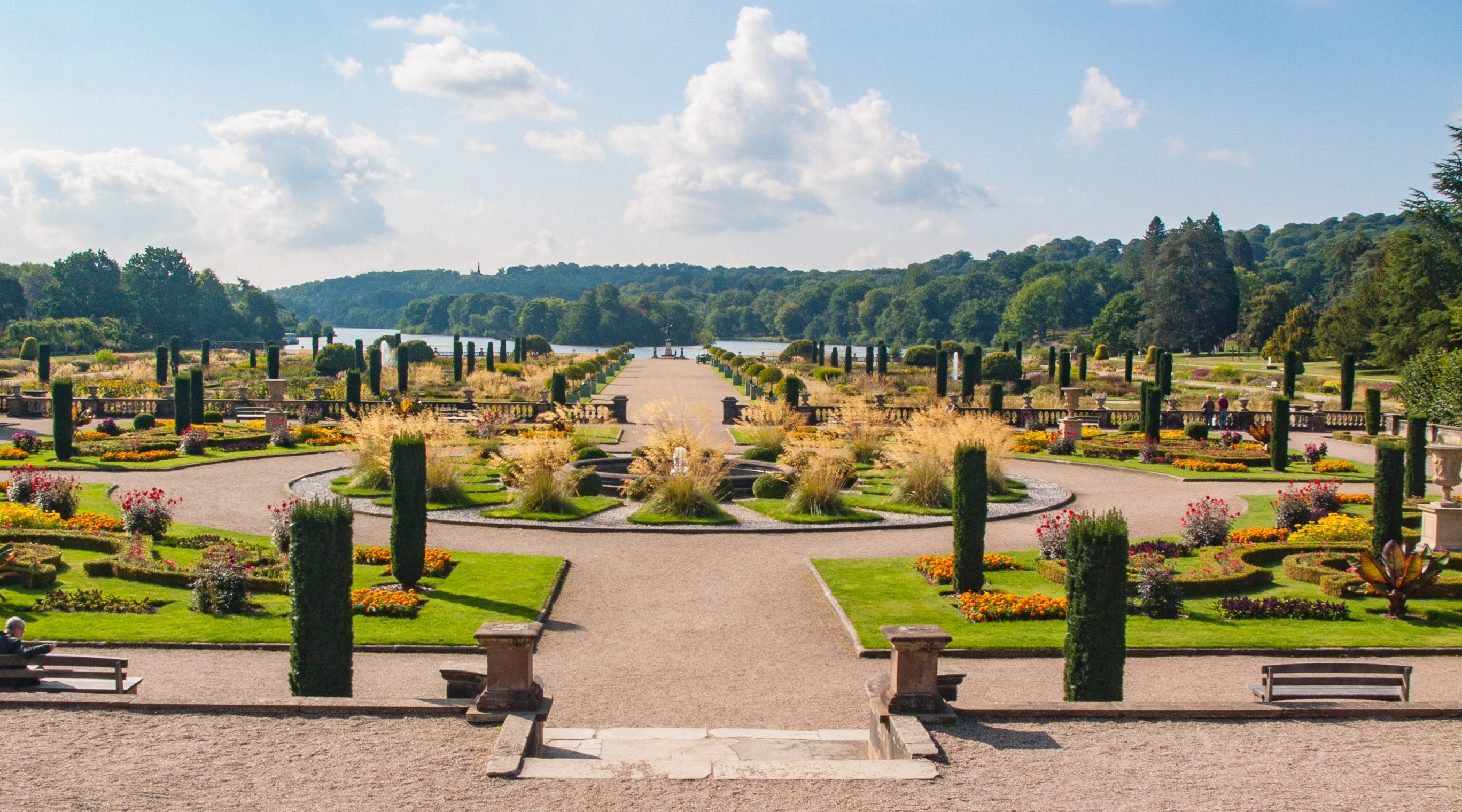
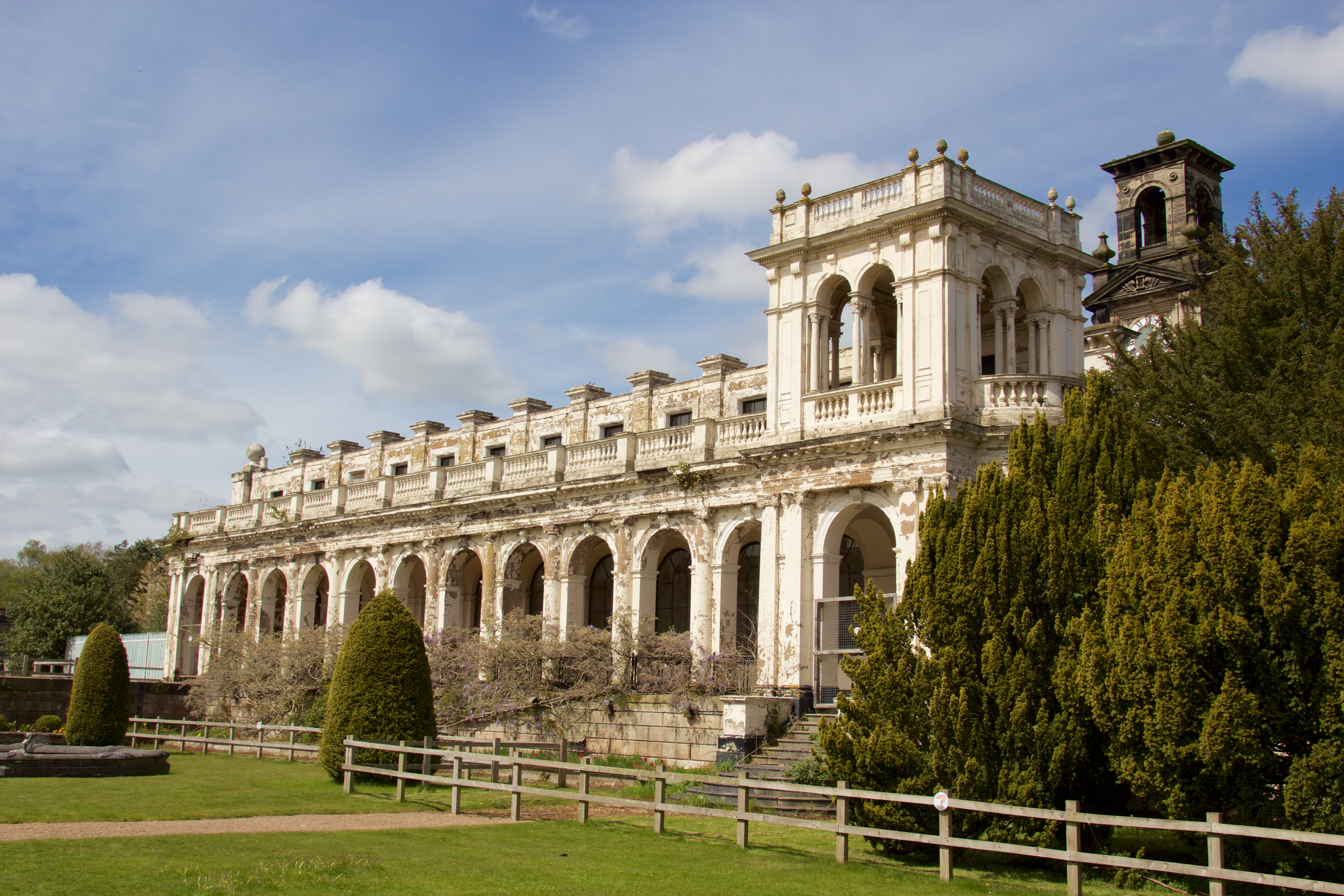
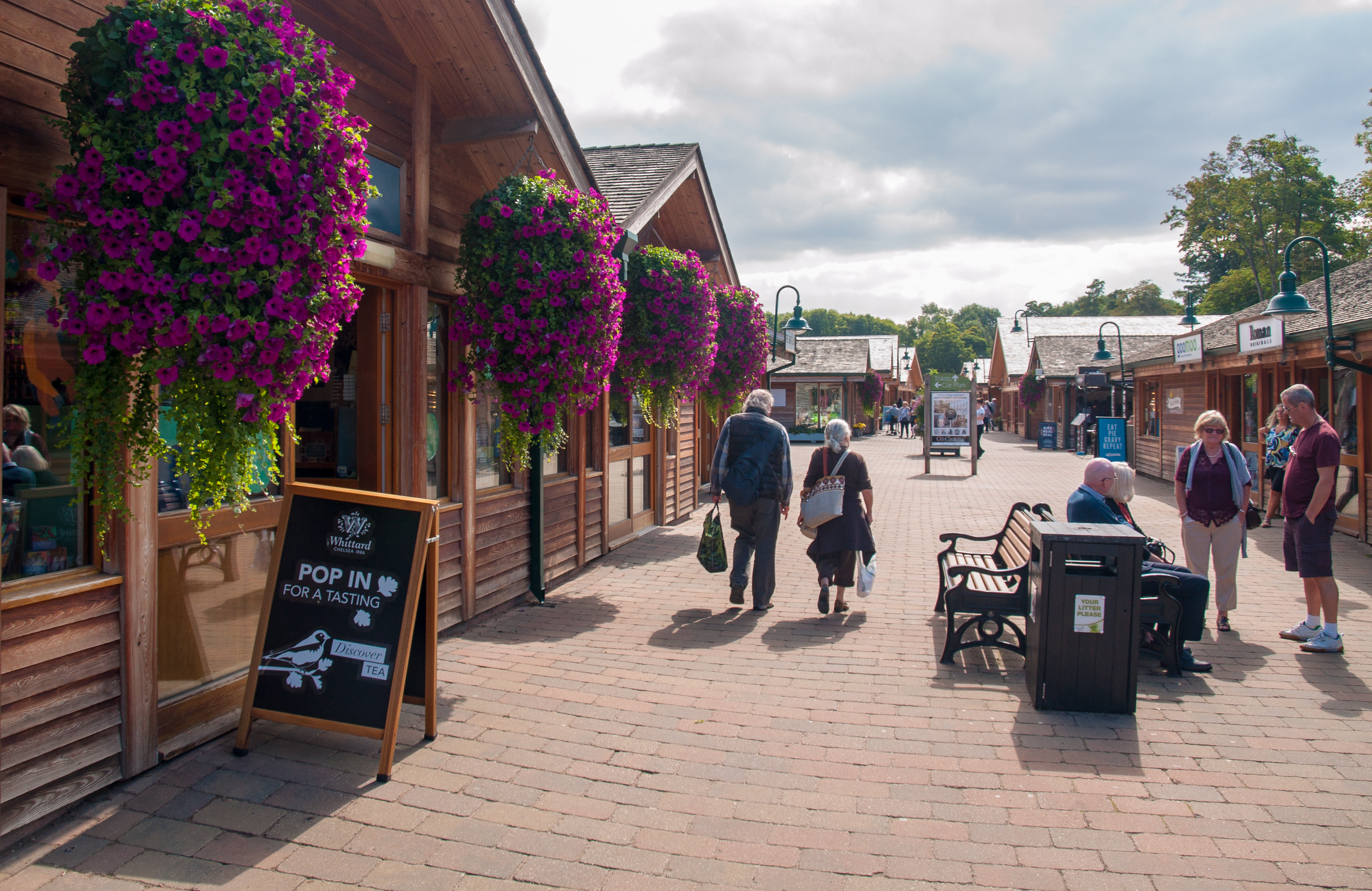
- The gardens (top), the hall's service block (left) and the shopping village (right)
- Interactive map of Trentham
- 52°57′48″N 2°12′06″W
- Location: Swynnerton, Staffordshire

Site notes
- Website: trentham.co.uk

Listed Building – Grade II*
- Official name: Remains of Trentham Hall: The Grand Entrance and conservatory
- Designated: 24 January 1967
- Reference no.: 1190243

Listed Building – Grade II*
- Official name: Trentham Gardens
- Designated: 01 December 1984
- Reference no.: 1001168

Trentham Estate is an estate and gardens, near the village of Trentham in Staffordshire, England, just on the southern fringe of the city of Stoke-on-Trent. It is centred on the ruins of Trentham Hall, and also hosts a monkey forest and a shopping village.

== History ==
The estate was first recorded in the Domesday Book in 1086. At the time it was a royal manor, with a value of 115 shillings. An Augustinian priory originally occupied the site, followed by a convent. Trentham Priory occupied land on the Trentham estate from the 11th century until the Dissolution of the Monasteries.

== Trentham Hall ==
The property was sold in 1540 to James Leveson, a Wolverhampton wool merchant. The Leveson family occupied the property and Sir Richard Leveson built a new house in 1634. It was a large Elizabethan house, which was probably demolished to make way for a later Georgian house. The Leveson heiress Frances married Sir Thomas Gower Bt leading to the creation of the Leveson-Gower family. Their son, Sir William Leveson-Gower, 4th Baronet, built a new house on the site in 1690.

Around 1730, John Leveson-Gower, 1st Earl Gower, erected a new residence based on Buckingham House. It was substantially altered by his son, the 1st Marquess of Stafford, from designs by Henry Holland, between 1775 and 1778.

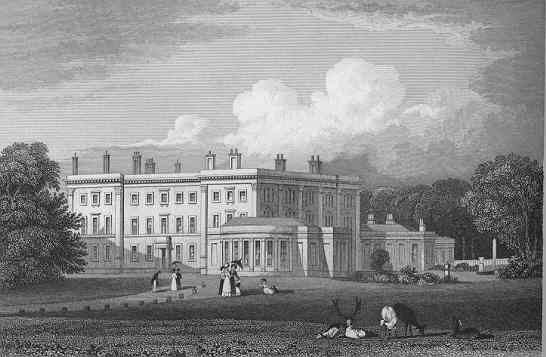
Trentham Hall in the 1820s, before the 19th-century expansion

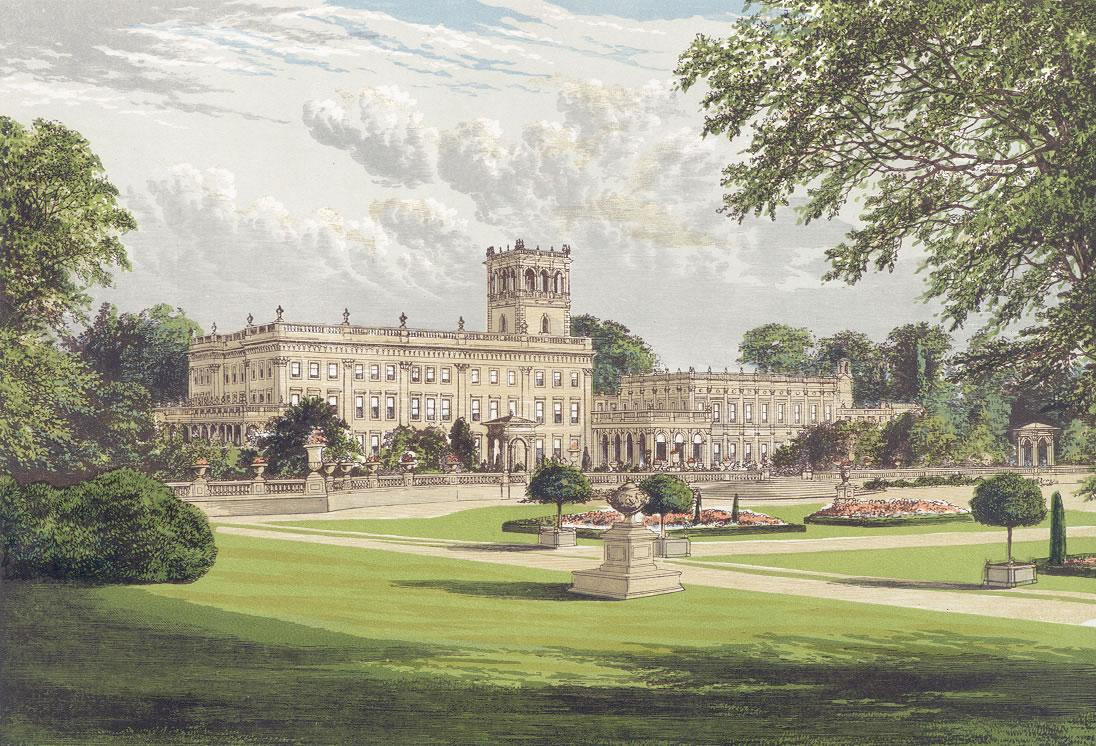
Trentham Hall in 1880 from Morris's Seats of Noblemen and Gentlemen: The front entrance is at the left, leading into the three-storey main house. The two-storey family wing is at the right, beyond the campanile.

The house, of which parts remain dating from 1833 to 1842, was designed by Sir Charles Barry, while he was working on the rebuilding of the Palace of Westminster, at the commission of the 2nd Duke of Sutherland. The focal point of the building was a 10,000-square-foot (930 m^{2}) campanile clock tower.

Barry spent over ten years improving the house. The original approach to the hall was from the west, and an Italianate grand entrance was part of the western front. The one-storey arcade range is semicircular with side wings. It was made of plastered brick and ashlar, and had unfluted Ionic columns on each side of its bays, as well as a balustrade above the cornice. The centre has a three-arched entrance with porte-cochère projects and a coat of arms is carved above. The right wing incorporates an orangery that was originally built in 1808 by Heathcote Tatham. Barry also added a new block including state bedrooms and dressing rooms, as well as servant's quarters, a sculpture gallery and a clock tower. This complex, with its clock tower, is generally known as the Riding School, designed in 1840 and built between 1841 and 1850. It stands on the perimeter of a large cobbled stableyard and represents the last major addition to, and almost sole survivor of, the once-exciting and impressive residence.

The house is surrounded by an 18th- and 19th-century park designed by Lancelot Brown. It has served as the Staffordshire seat of the Dukes of Sutherland, and their traditional burial place was Trentham Mausoleum nearby.

During a visit to Trentham Hall in June 1873, the Shah of Iran, Naser al-Din Shah Qajar, remarked to the future King Edward VII (then the Prince of Wales) regarding regarding their host, the 3rd Duke of Sutherland: "Too grand for a subject; you'll have to have his head off when you come to the throne."

In the southern area of the Trentham Estate stands the monument to the 1st Duke of Sutherland. This colossal statue, designed by Winks and sculptured by Sir Francis Leggatt Chantrey, surmounts a plain column of stone on a tiered pedestal. The monument was raised in 1834 at the instigation of the second duke, a year after the first duke's death. A wide range of possible monuments was put forward, but Chantrey, with whom Loch, the duke's chief agent, had been in touch, recommended Sir Charles Barry for the design of the monument.

=== Demolition ===
The hall was one of many to be demolished in the 20th century, and was one of the greatest losses of the era. The River Trent no longer fed the lake in front of the hall, but it still passed the edge of the estate. Sewage and effluent from nearby potteries polluted it in the early 20th century, making life at the hall unpleasant.

The hall was abandoned as a residence in 1905, and was shortly thereafter offered to Staffordshire County Council on condition that it be used as an institute of higher education, to house a potential North Staffordshire College.

The county council, being unwilling to open a higher education institution, proposed using the hall for a teacher training college, but the Duke of Sutherland was unhappy with this suggestion. As the requirement to open a higher educational establishment remained, and with the council concerned that pollution from the Trent would render a residential institution at the hall undesirable, the county council declined the offer in 1906.

The Duke of Sutherland then decided to offer the estate to the six Potteries towns (Note: The six towns who would go on to federate to Stoke-on-Trent Borough Council in 1910: Burslem, Fenton, Hanley, Longton, Stoke-upon-Trent and Tunstall.) in 1907, in the event that they went ahead with plans to merge into a single county borough. but after their 1910 federation, the new Stoke-on-Trent Corporation also declined the offer in 1911, citing the high maintenance costs.

The hall was demolished in 1912–13 by its owner, the 4th Duke of Sutherland.

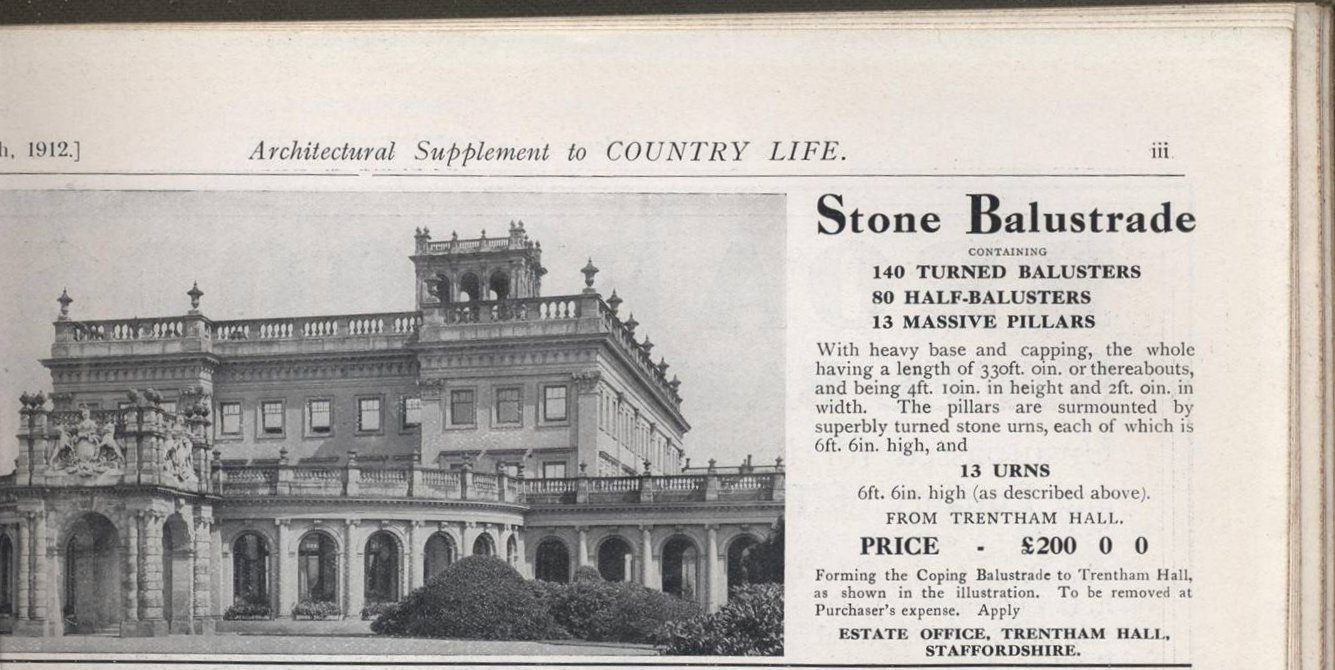
An advertisement, from 1912, for the roofing balustrade and urns from the demolished Trentham Hall

During the 20th century, the estate was used for an amusement park and even for hosting the Lombard RAC Rally, which cut through the Italianate gardens.

The sculpture gallery, clock tower, and parish church, as well as other buildings, were not demolished.

=== Current status ===
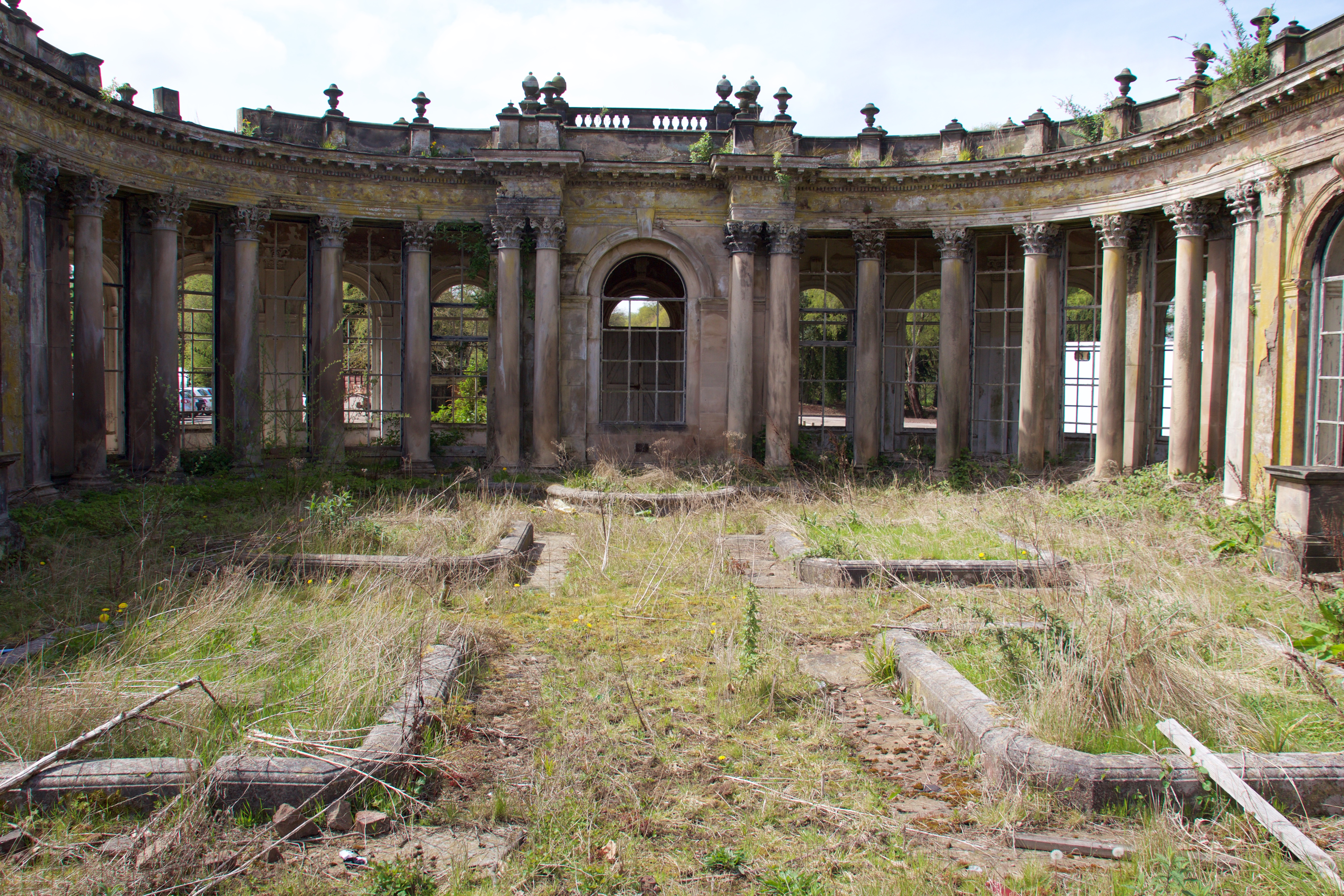
The Grand Entrance in 2015

The remains of Trentham Hall, namely the Grand Entrance and Orangery, were listed on 24 January 1967. Their listing was amended on 25 April 1980. They are currently Grade II* listed. Emergency repairs to stabilise the building were carried out. It is listed on the Heritage at Risk Register. The sculpture gallery (now covered in wisteria) and clock tower also remain.

The property was purchased by St. Modwen Properties in 1996, at which point the buildings and gardens were derelict and vandalised, and contracted the Land Use Consultants company to restore the historic landscape. The surrounding Trentham Gardens were restored in 2003–04, and in 2013 they were visited by over 3 million people. The Trentham Estate contains a shopping village, as well as gardens.

St. Modwen set out a plan to recreate the house according to the original designs at the cost of £35 million as a five-star hotel with 150 rooms, a luxury spa, and a conference centre. Planning permission was granted, and initial plans aimed for a 2008 completion date, which was later revised to 2011. However, in 2013 they stated that despite having planning permission to restore the hall, it was not economically viable to do so, given that the £30–35 million cost of restoring and rebuilding the hall would be greater than the hall's value as a hotel due to the then-recent economic recession, although they stated that they were committed to restoring the hall when they could "make the numbers work". As of May 2015, the buildings stand derelict.

== Trentham Gardens ==
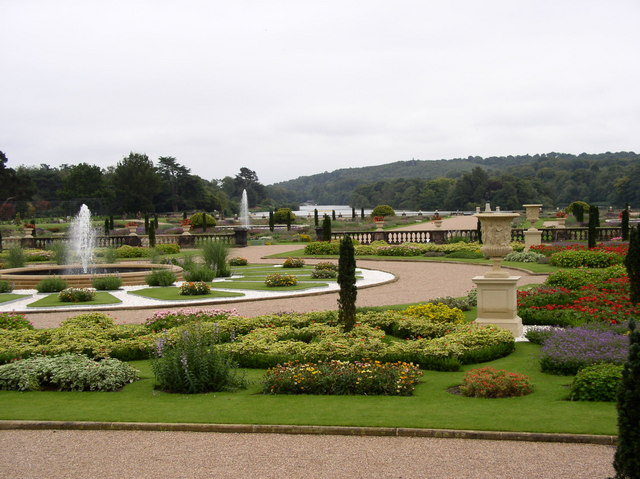
Italian Garden

Trentham Gardens are formal Italianate gardens, part of an English landscape park. The gardens are set within a large area of woodland. Together these currently together cover some 300 acres (120 hectares). The estate is a Grade II* registered park and garden.

=== History ===
The gardens were designed as a serpentine park by Capability Brown from 1758 onwards, overlying an earlier formal design attributed to Charles Bridgeman. Trentham Gardens are now principally known for the surviving formal gardens laid out in the 1840s by Sir Charles Barry, which have recently been restored. In 2012 the Trentham Estate was selected as the site of a Royal Diamond Jubilee wood, and a new woodland of 200,000 native oak trees will be planted on the estate. Successful garden designers Tom Stuart-Smith, Piet Oudolf and Nigel Dunnett have collaborated on the garden redesign.

Since 2000 Trentham Gardens has undergone a £120 million ($200 m) redevelopment by St. Modwen Properties as a leisure destination. The regeneration project at Trentham includes restoration of the Italian gardens and adjacent woodlands, the creation of a garden centre and crafts centre, and various leisure attractions. The overall aim is to avoid noisy theme park-like attractions, and instead to offer "authentic experiences" to older people and younger children. Each year on bonfire night, visitors pay to see a bonfire with fireworks, food and fairground rides. Wire sculptures of fairies by Robin Wright have been installed in the gardens.

In December 2008 a transportable Ferris wheel was opened on site for tourists to get an overhead view of the gardens, the estate, and out over the city. It was removed in 2009.

In December 2022, the estate announced it had gained a licence from Natural England to host four Eurasian beavers from Spring 2023. This would involve enclosing the lake area and gardens to prevent the animals escaping.

=== Mountain biking ===
Trentham Gardens hosted the first-ever Mountain Mayhem, a 24-hour race which included some of the biggest mountain bike brands of all time including Raleigh and Giant; 120 other teams also entered. The course was just under 10 miles (16 kilometres) long.

The winning team was the Raleigh Pro Team managed by Gary Coltman with riders Barrie Clarke, Elliot Baxter, Carl Sturgeon and Ian Cuthbertson. The Giant Team came second. They were managed by Martin Earley who also rode in the team along with Jamie Norfolk, Robin Seymour and Robert Miller. There were only teams and no solo entrants.

From 2001 to 2004 the Sleepless in the Saddle mountain bike races were held at Trentham.

== Trentham Ballroom ==
The gardens were the site of the Trentham Ballroom, which opened in 1931 and closed in 2002. During the Second World War it was used by the Bankers' Clearing House for the clearing of the country's cheques. In the 1960s and 1970s many rock and pop bands performed at Trentham Ballroom, including The Beatles, Pink Floyd, The Who, Iron Maiden and Led Zeppelin. The ballroom also hosted degree ceremonies for North Staffordshire Polytechnic.

== Trentham Gardens use as a music video location ==
Trentham Gardens was used as the filming location for Altern 8's song Activ 8 alongside Shelly's Laserdome. The inside of the building can be seen many times during the video and the outside of the building was also used. The duo can be seen playing two violins inside of the building and can then be seen playing a Roland TB-303 and a Roland SH-101 on the outside of the building.

== Trentham at war ==
Before World War I, the Staffordshire Yeomanry used Trentham as a summer military training camp between 1909 and 1914.

During World War II the Trentham Estate became a military regroupment camp for French soldiers. The French soldiers were a mix of the Foreign Legion, the Chasseurs Alpins (the light mountain division) and a tank company.

The 1,619 men of the 13th Demi-Brigade of the Foreign Legion had been in Norway, but had been pulled out to defend a line in Brittany from where they then fled to Britain. The Chasseurs Alpins had arrived from Dunkirk. The Trentham camp was initially organised by the local YMCA volunteers. The FAFL pilot Marc Hauchemaille (1907–1942) recorded in his diary that "There are six or seven thousand men in the camp – a miracle of English organisation – in a few hours we have tents, groundsheets, cooking utensils" – although proper medical facilities took longer to organise. Numbers at the camp appear to have lessened to 5,530 after the initial influx.

By July 1940, the camp was split into pro- and anti-Vichy France factions. Some 600 men of the Foreign Legion chose to leave to join the Vichy Legion in North Africa. Around 900 other left to join the Free French. The bulk of the French troops remained at Trentham. The attitude of local people appears to have changed after the initial arrival: there were complaints about the killing of the deer herd, to the extent that estate records show that nearly all the deer were killed; discipline was lax; and there was extensive fraternisation with local girls. By the end of the war, local people's animosity toward the remaining French was such that many of the soldiers were glad to leave.

== Monkey Forest ==
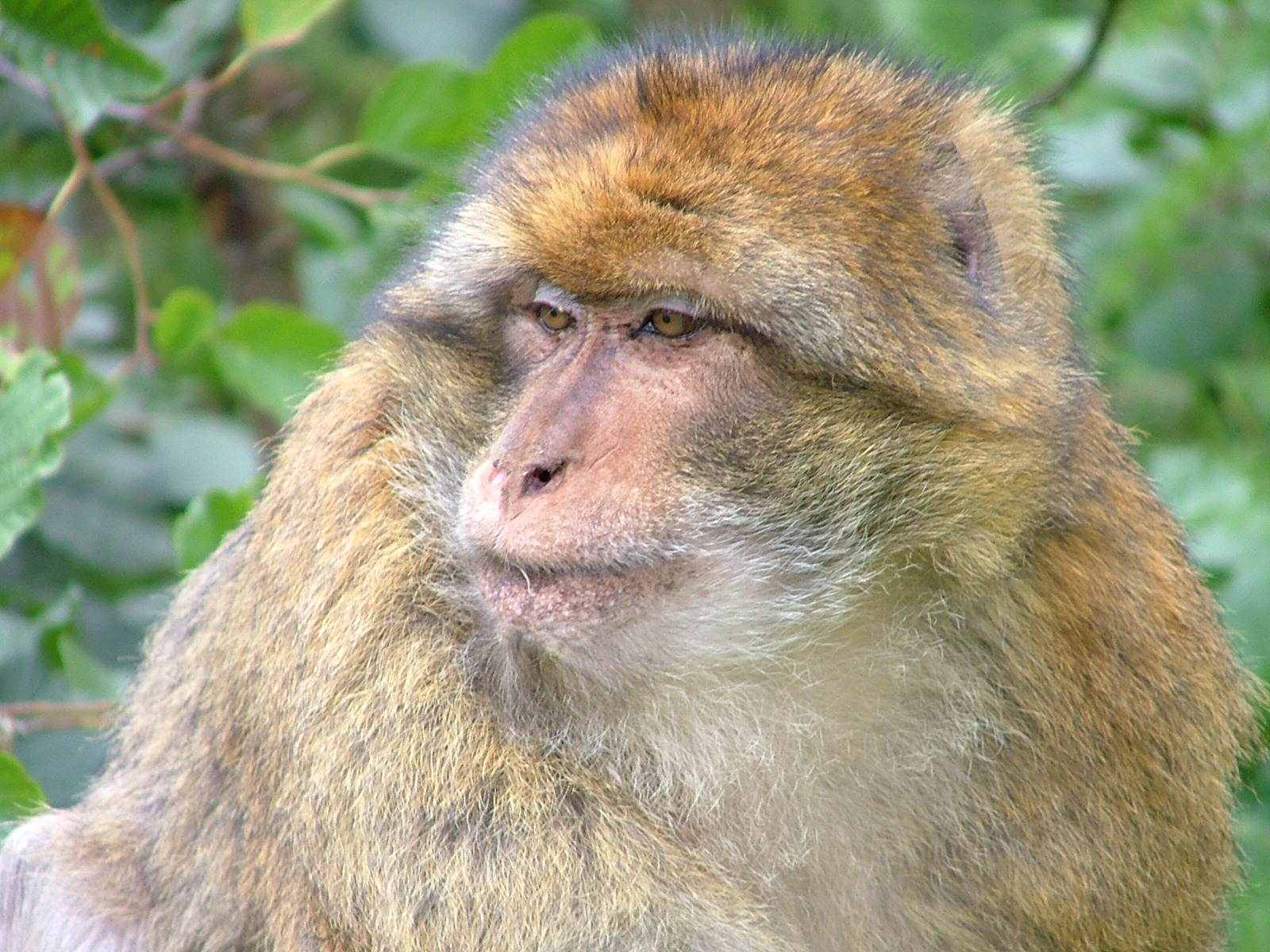
Barbary macaque at Trentham Monkey Forest

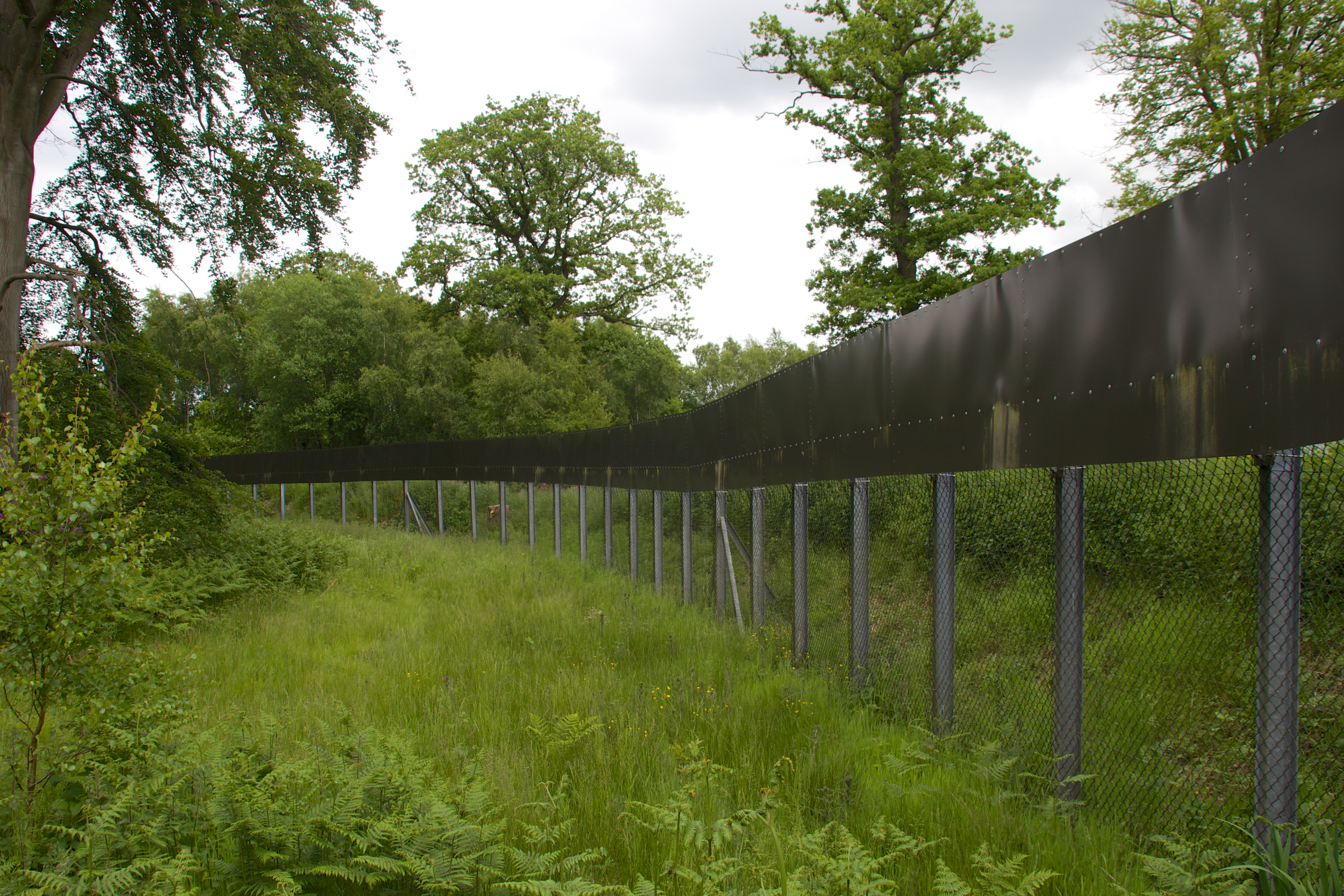
The fence around Trentham Monkey Forest

As part of the regeneration, Trentham Monkey Forest, the first wildlife park of its kind in England, was opened in July 2005. It consists of 60 acres (24 hectares) of forest, which contain 140 Barbary macaques, wandering freely. There is a 0.75 miles (1.21 km) path through the forest along which visitors walk; there are no barriers between the forest and the path, although visitors are confined to the path, which has guides to ensure the safety of both the visitors and monkeys, and there is a fence around the forest. The park is one of four owned by the de Turckheim family; the other three are La Montagne des Singes in Alsace, France (opened in 1969), La Forêt des Singes in Lot, France (opened in 1974), and Affenberg Salem close to Bodensee, Germany (opened in 1976). The forest is open to visitors every day between April and October inclusive, and opens on weekends and school holidays in February, March and November.

There are two groups of 70 macaques at the forest, which were originally from other parks in France and Germany and inhabit different parts of the forest. The oldest macaque is around 30 years old. All of the macaques are individually identified with a tattoo on their inner thigh. A number of the female macaques have been given contraceptive implants to limit the number of babies born at the site to around 5 to 15 per year.

One aim of the forest is to increase awareness about the endangered species; it also aims to create and preserve a gene pool and to re-introduce groups of macaques into the wild. Already 591 macaques from the forest's three sister parks have been re-introduced to the wild at the Atlas Mountains, Morocco. The forest also has a conference venue. The forest supports research into the biology and social behaviour of the macaques at the park.

== See also ==
- Listed buildings in Swynnerton
