= Shi Qinglan =

Chinese cross-country mountain biker

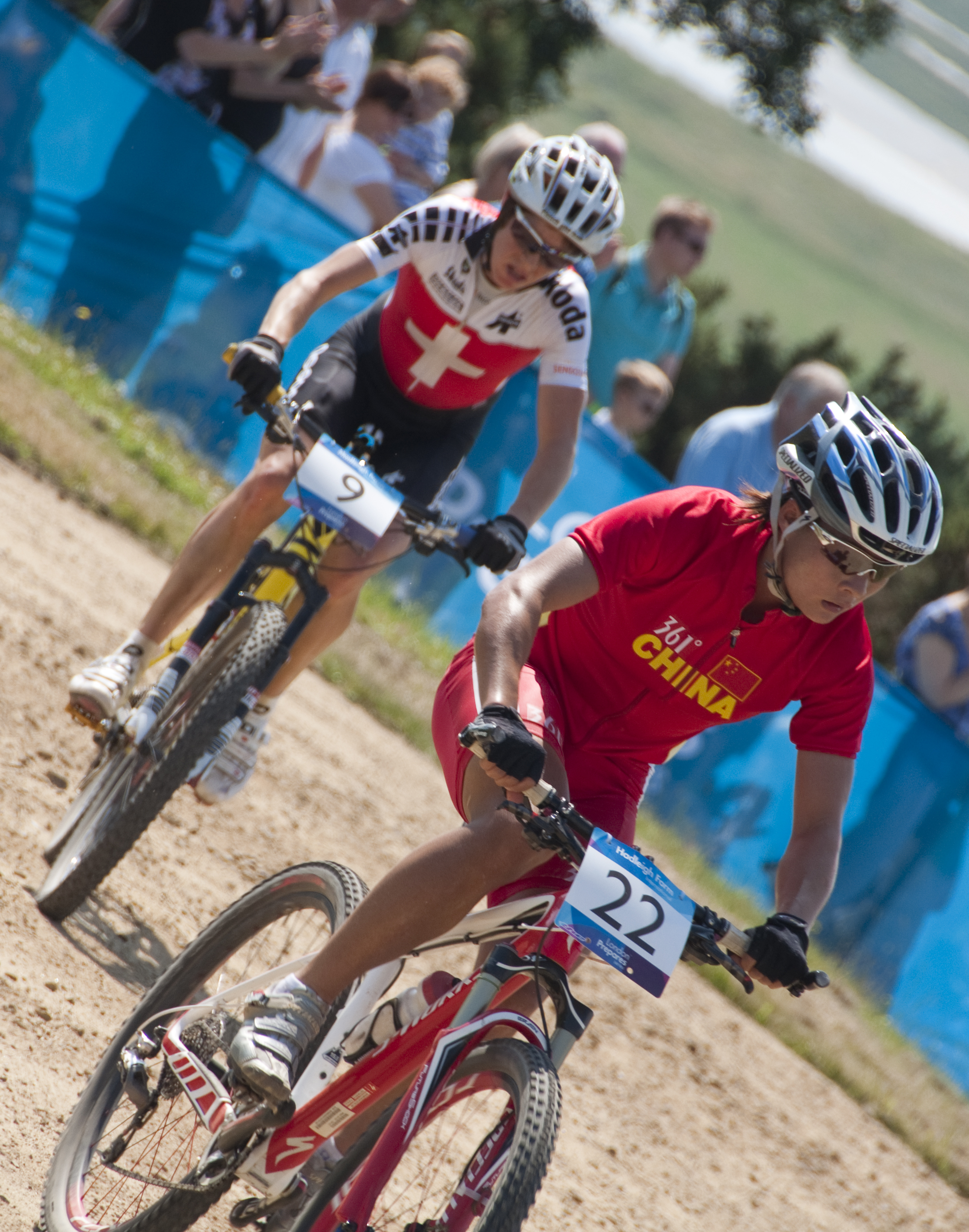
Shi and Suess finished 9th and 10th at the Hadleigh International in 2011.

Shi Qinglan is a Chinese cross-country mountain biker. At the 2012 Summer Olympics, she competed in the Women's cross-country at Hadleigh Farm, finishing in 12th place.
