= Lucky Street, Beijing =

Restaurant street in Beijing

Lucky Street (Chinese: 好运街; pinyin: Hǎoyùn Jiē) is a restaurant street in Beijing uniquely offering a street of almost entirely foreign cuisine, many restaurants of which are joint ventures or foreign run. The street includes German, Spanish, Italian, French, Indian, Japanese, Korean and a smaller number of Chinese restaurants. The street was deliberately developed by the Chaoyang District municipal government to create an area of restaurants catering to the Chaoyang District's large expat community. The street runs along one side of the road opposite another development on land formerly part of Chaoyang Park, the Solana Shopping Village.
