= Nirjala Tamrakar =

Nepalese cyclist

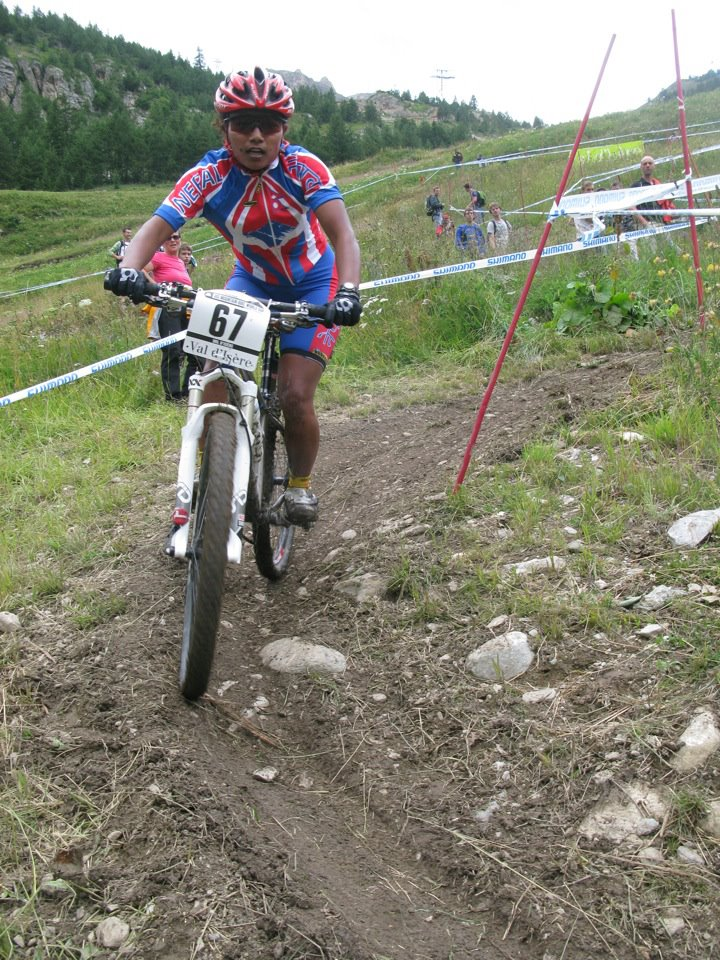
- UCI World Cup Finals, France, 2012

Personal information
- Full name: Nirjala Tamrakar
- Nickname: Mountain Queen
- Born: 24 August 1979 (age 47) Kathmandu, Nepal

Cycling career
- Sport: Cycling
- Current team: Retired
- Disciplines: Cross Country and Endurance
- Role: Rider and qualified UCI Coach
- Rider type: Professional (RETIRED)

Professional teams
- 2001–2012: National Team (NP)
- ?: Qoroz (UK)

Nirjala Tamrakar, also known as the "Mountain Queen", (born 24 August 1979) is a Nepalese cross-country mountain biker who was national champion from 2001 to 2012.

== Personal life ==
Born in Kumari Pati in Kathmandu, Nepal. Nirjala is one of two children, with a younger brother who is a road biker. Nirjala started out in her late teens as a professional model. For this career she was required to keep fit and it was through going to the gym that she got into first body building and then cycling. In 2001 some friends suggested she try her luck in a mountain bike race "The Himalayan Mountain Bike Race Series" and she won the National Women's Category. This proved to be her inspiration to leave modelling and pursue a professional career as a Cyclist for the Nepal National Team.

Nirjala's rise to fame and to working as a professional Athlete for the Nepal National Team was beset by difficulty that arose from the patriarchy based society in which she grew up in. Although she competed at a National and International Level and at a higher level than the majority of Nepalese male riders she was marginalized by her own National Cycling Association who found sponsors and endorsement for her male counterparts. Despite this she continued and found her own sponsors (like Qoroz Professional Titanium Bikes).

She is now a key note speaker and role model for young women in Nepal and all over the world who have grown up in oppressive societies but dream of being recognized for their sports and achievements. The British writer "Jane Nobel Knight" wrote a book titled "The Inspiring Journeys of Pilgrim Mothers" and included a chapter on Nirjala's struggle and eventual success in her field .

Nirjala is now married and has a son. She is also a respected mandala Artist (three time Nepal National, Street Mandala winner) and holds a Masters in Business Studies.

== Race history ==
- 2001 – Himalayan Mountain Bike Race Series
- 2002 -
- 2003 -
- 2004 -
- 2005 -
- 2006 – South Asian Games, Colombo, Sri Lanka (Road Race)
- 2007 -
- 2008 –
- 2009 – Asian Mountain Bike Championship, Mel-aka, Malaysia
- 2010 – Asian Games – Guangzhou, China,
- 2010 – S. Asian Games, Bangladesh
- 2011 –
- 2012 – UCI World Cup Finals in Val D'Isere, France;
- 2012 – Enduro (Gold), Gloucestershire, UK
- 2019 – 2019 Pokhara South Asian Games (Triathlon) – 2 Dec 2019 – Elite Women – 01:21:18
- 2021 – First Nepalese Athlete (male or female) to complete a Full Distance Triathlon (Swim 2.4 miles, Bike 112 miles, Run 26,2 miles) on 6 June 2021 in the UK.

== Notable achievements ==
1. First Nepalese Woman to cycle 22 days from Lhasa (Tibet) to Everest Base Camp (North) to Kathmandu (Nepal)
2. First female to Win (2 times) the Highest Altitude, Endurance race in the World "The Yak Attack"
3. First Nepalese Female to win a cycle race in the UK
4. First Nepalese Cycle Athlete to compete in a UCI World Cup Finals
5. First Nepalese Cycle Athlete to compete in South Asian Games
6. First Nepalese Woman to complete a cycle race of the Annapurna Circuit
7. Recipient of the – "Tamrakar Award Fund" – Ugrachandi Award (Nepal)
8. 1st Nepalese Athlete (male or female) to complete a full distance Triathlon – UK 2021
