= Kue King =

American artist

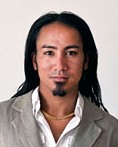
- Born: Ronald Sunga Reyes; January 17, 1981 (age 45); Olongapo, Philippines
- Known for: Sculpture, Jewellery
- Website: Official website

Kue King (born Ronald Sunga Reyes; January 17, 1981) is a Filipino American sculptor.

== Biography ==
Kue King was born Ronald Sunga Reyes on January 17, 1981, in the City of Olongapo in the province of Zambales, Philippines. Youngest of six from a first generation Asian American family, Reyes lived in Olongapo until age seven, when his parents (Maria Teresa Sunga Reyes and Camillo Reyes) moved to Jacksonville, Florida where he spent the next seventeen years of his life. Although a photography major at the Douglas Anderson School of Arts, it was here that he started pursuing his artistic interests, whilst frequently travelling and furnishing an image of a lebenskünstler. At the age of 24, he moved from Florida to Hawaii, where he received awards (for a best show, a second and a first place for an artwork) for three consecutive years by the East Hawaii Cultural Center. At age 29 he moved to San Francisco; he has been travelling ever since.

== Work ==
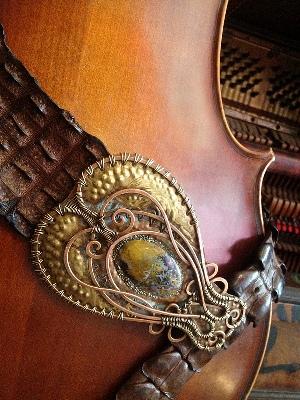
Serpent Belt, wearable art belt, alligator leather, copper, brass, stone (2010)

Inspired by nature and dance, King has created artworks that have been called "tranquil in their deceptive simplicity." Largely self-taught, he combines the use of wire tightly fastened to objects of nature to create organic forms and figures. He also works with jewellery.

=== Biomorphs ===
What started with wire sculpting small shapes such as branches and flowers - during the first years of the war on terror handed out freely across the United States as an anti-war message - King would turn into an original art form, combining aluminum, stainless steel fiber, brass wire and feathers to achieve the "grand sense of the organic". Self-titled biomorphs, the sculptures were supposedly inspired by the artist's meditation among the branches of a tree gripping a side of a cliff and curving upward above a ravine.

=== Wearable Art ===
Although distancing himself from a more serious future endeavor in fashion design, King's interest in ancient craftsmanship and jewellery's role-distinguishing social function has resulted in the creation of what he calls wearable art, which mainly consists of lavishly decorated belts.

== Exhibitions ==
- Museo Antropologico y de Arte Contemporaneo de Guayaquil, Ecuador, Permanent Collection, Lobby.
- Centro de Arte Contemporáneo de Quito, Ecuador, Permanent Collection, Lobby.
- Adriana Hoyos, Cumbayá, Ecuador
- Adriana Hoyos, Miami, USA
- Springfield's 9th & Main gallery
- Volvano Arts Center
- 3rd Dimension Gallery
- Gumps, San Francisco
- Coup de Tate, San Francisco
- Cabana Home, Mill Valley, CA
- Lucky Street Gallery, Key West, Florida
- Spring Open Studio (April 2011)
- Sausalito Arts Festival, Sausalito, California (2011, 2012)
