= Mountain bike racing =

Competitive cycle sport discipline

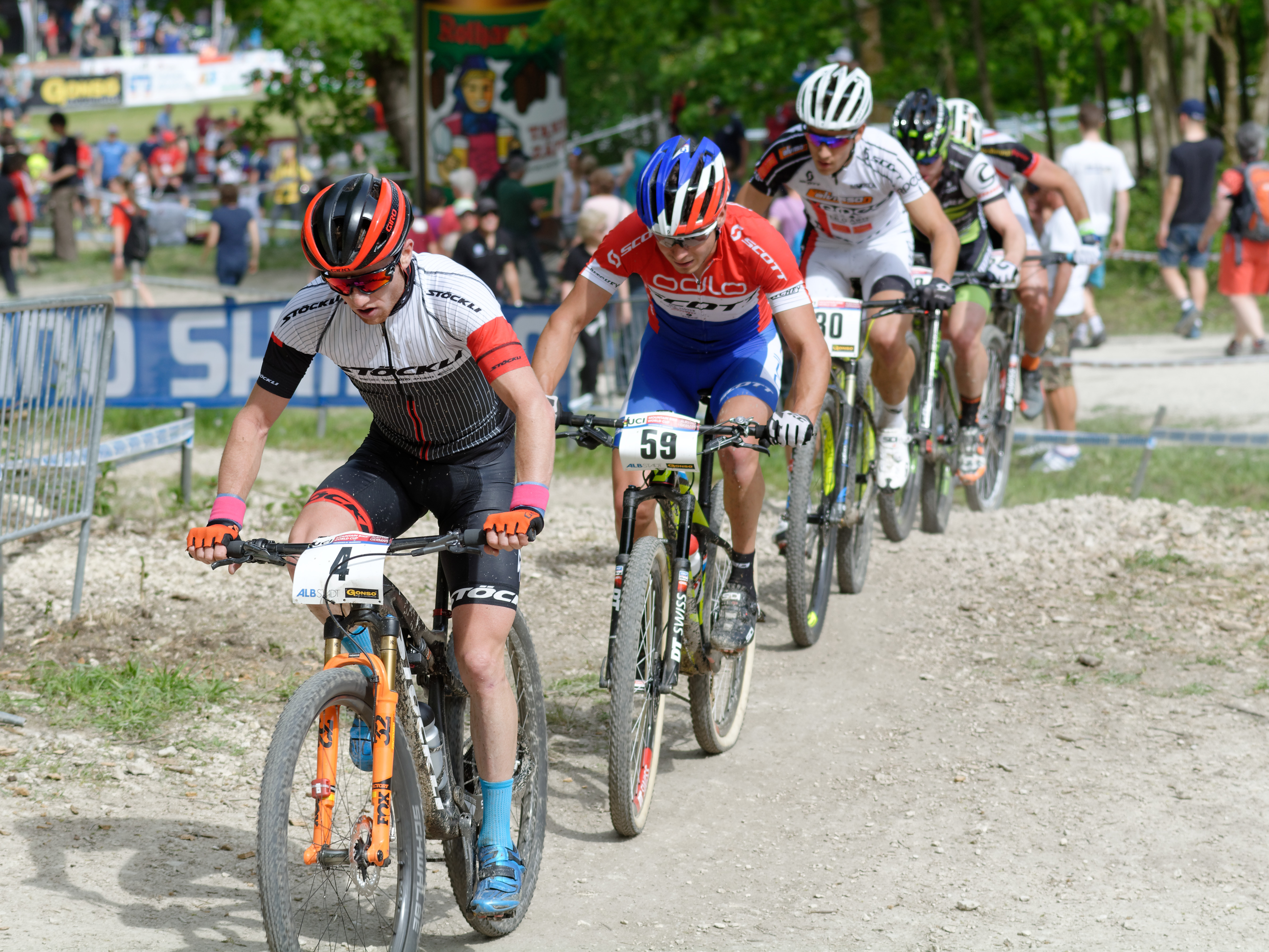
- A cross-country race of the 2016 UCI Mountain Bike World Cup held in Albstadt, Germany
- Highest governing body: UCI
- Nicknames: MTB racing

Characteristics
- Contact: No, although bodies do touch
- Team members: Individuals
- Mixed-sex: Yes, separate competitions
- Type: Cycle sport
- Equipment: Mountain bike, downhill bike
- Venue: Off-road

Presence
- Country or region: Worldwide
- Olympic: Yes, men's and women's since the 1996 Olympics

Pictogram for Cycling at the Summer Olympics

Mountain bike racing (shortened MTB or ATB racing) is the competitive cycle sport discipline of mountain biking held on off-road terrain. The Union Cycliste Internationale (UCI) recognised the discipline relatively late in 1990, when it sanctioned the world championships in Durango, Colorado. The first UCI Mountain Bike World Cup series took place in 1988. Its nine-race circuit covered two continents—Europe and North America—and was sponsored by Grundig. Cross-country racing was the only World Cup sport at this time. In 1993, a six-event downhill World Cup was introduced. In 1996, cross-country mountain biking events were added to the Olympic Games. In 2006, cross-country mountain biking events became part of the World Deaf Cycling Championships for the first time in San Francisco, USA.

In the United States, there are three USA Cycling Mountain Bike National Calendars: Endurance, Gravity and Ultra-Endurance. USA Cycling runs the USA Cycling Mountain Bike National Championships. There are mountain bike racing types that are not recognized by the UCI, such as mountain bike orienteering that is governed by the IOF.

== History ==
Mountain bike racing is as old as the first appearance of the mountain bike itself, when the originators, calling themselves klunkers, descended with their heavily modified beach cruiser bikes as predecessors of modern mountain bikes from numerous mountains in California against a rudimentary time measurement. The famous Repack racing down-hill against the time near Fairfax, Marin County, CA took place in 1976.

The oldest organised cross-country (XC) racing-like event, however, is believed to take place from Crested Butte to Aspen in Colorado in 1978. It took 10 years before the UCI recognised racing on mountain bikes as a regular cycling discipline in 1990. In the meantime, the phenomenon of mountain bike racing spread across the U.S.A. under the umbrella of NORBA.

The most plausible, although still speculative reason, was an early resemblance of the racing courses for mountain bikes with the cyclo-cross discipline, with a major difference: the mountain bike racing track was significantly longer (a cyclo-cross course has 2.5–3.5 km versus 4+ km for a XC track) and free of artificial obstacles. With the rapid advancement of mountain bike gear, namely stronger brakes and suspension, the mountain bike racing could take place on even more technical tracks making it more dissimilar to the cyclo-cross discipline.

Mountain bike racing became an Olympic discipline in 1996 and a cross-country type mountain biking race has been held ever since its debut at the summer Olympic games in Atlanta. Given the enormous variation of terrain a mountain bike can navigate, a division took place as a cause of riders' specialisation.

== Types ==
Today, Mountain Biking consists of a range of event types and categories. There are six disciplines described by the Union Cycliste Internationale - the sports governing body. These can loosely be grouped into either Endurance or Gravity based disciplines.

=== UCI sanctioned ===
Endurance-based UCI Disciplines
| Name | UCI Abbreviation | Notes |
|---|---|---|
| Cross-country Olympic | XCO | Commonly referred to as or "XC" colloquially, racing is held on a varied terrain circuit, it is normally around 6–8 kilometers (km) and is always a massed-start race. Cross-country races are held over undulating circuits (with technical descents, forest roads, rocky paths and obstacles), with a total time that varies from 1 h 20 minutes to 1 h 40 minutes depending on the category and course. |
| Cross-country Marathon | XCM | Marathon (XCM) is perhaps the toughest form of mountain biking because riders often have to cover more than 80 km in one race on mountainous terrain. The distances usually vary from 60 km to 100 km. Races often exceed 100 km, but are then termed Ultra-Marathons. Recently UCI has inaugurated the Marathon World Cup. Basically it equals point-to-point (PP) discipline and that means that riders have a mass start from point "A" and they finish at point "B". |
| Cross-country Eliminator | XCE | The Cross-country eliminator event must be between 500m and 1000m. It is a fast-moving, dynamic, action-packed format in which four riders race in heats on technical tracks featuring obstacles such as jumps and bridges. Competitions begin with a qualifying heat that takes the form of an individual timed lap of the circuit, as a result of which the fastest 32 men and 16 women qualify for the main competition. The fastest two riders in each heat thereafter qualify for the next round, with the format continuing until only four riders remain to contest the final. |

Gravity based UCI Disciplines
| Name | UCI Abbreviation | Notes |
|---|---|---|
| Downhill | DHI | Commonly referred to as or "DH" colloquially, is a race against the clock in which the rider negotiates a succession of fast and technical passages. The participant must demonstrate courage as well as sharp technical and piloting skills in order to affront tree roots, banked sections, bumps, jumps and other natural obstacles along the way. DH races are held in steep, downhill terrain, resulting in higher speed than in cross-country racing. The terrain is also significantly rougher than in cross-country racing. Speeds reach around 80 km/h in the men's races and 70 km/h for women. |
| Four cross | 4X | Also known as 'mountain cross' or 'bikercross', it was largely inspired by BMX racing. This event pits four riders on the same course from starting gates to finish. There can only be one winner per event, so the races can quickly eliminate riders making the progression faster for a day's events. This is the reason it was chosen as the race-format to replace Dual-Slalom by the UCI at World Cup events. 4X also replaced Dual in the UCI World Cup series in 2002. There is a difference between 4X and mountain cross. In 4X, riders are each given a run down the course which is timed and the top 50% of the field then progress to the elimination rounds. In mountain cross, riders are given three heats against three other riders, and points are allocated for your position in each heat. Again, the top 50% progress to the elimination rounds. 4X was the format raced in world cup however mountain cross is the preferred format for amateur races. |
| Enduro | END | Enduro in its most basic definition is a type of mountain bike racing where the downhills are timed, and the uphills are not. Riders are timed in stages that are primarily downhill, with neutral "transfer" stages in between. The transfer stages usually must be completed within a time-limit, but are not part of the accumulated time. The winner is the rider who accumulates the lowest combined time from the timed downhill sections. Enduros typically take place over one or two days, but week-long competitions also exist. A typical one-day enduro consists of 3 to 5 timed stages which take place on technically demanding, generally descending terrain, often with sections of singletrack. In recent years, E-Bike racing has expanded with the addition of an END-E category. |

While often associated with mountain biking, bike trials is governed separately despite the close association with mountain biking.

Since 2024 UCI started organizing UCI Snow Bike World Championships for mountain bike racing on an alpine skiing course.

=== Non-UCI sanctioned ===
There are many non-UCI sanctioned disciplines. Some of these are listed below. These may include events which are the precursor to modern formats (such as the evolution of Super-D into Enduro), or events which have fallen from vogue for whatever reason (such as Dual Slalom), or non-time based events (such as Freeride).

- Super D – Super D (SD) is a blend of cross-country and downhill. Most of the race is downhill, on trails similar to the downhill segment of a cross-country race. There are also short (100–500m) uphill sections which make the use of downhill bicycles difficult, as a result, most riders use cross-country or 'trail bikes'. Depending on the trail and race venue, the start may either be seeded (riders start in short intervals), or Le Mans mass start (riders run to their bikes, timing is started when the riders start running). Probably the most famous of this type is the Megavalanche.

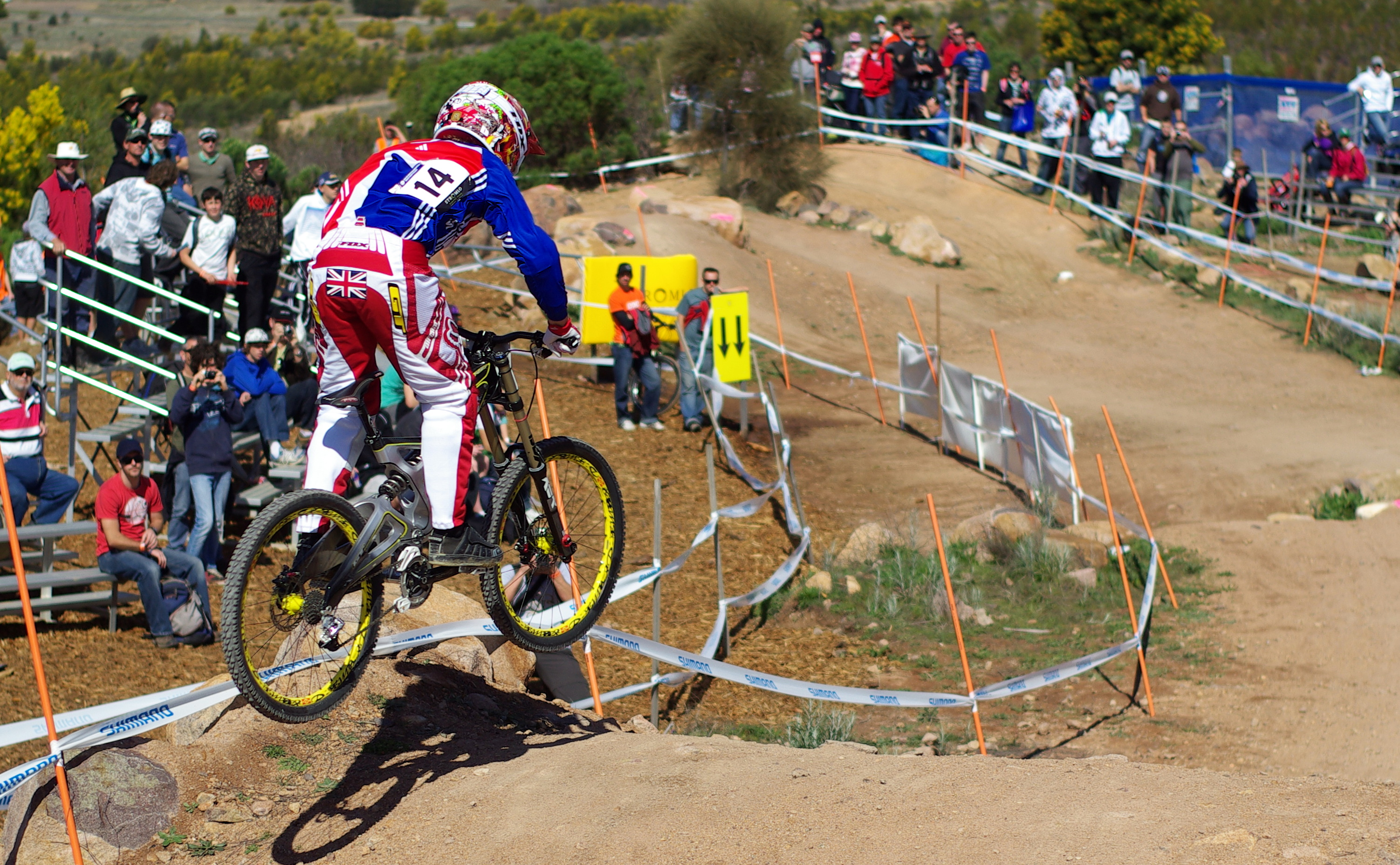
Marc Beaumont of Great Britain riding a downhill race the 2009 UCI Mountain Bike & Trials World Championships held at Mount Stromlo, near Canberra, Australia

- Dual Slalom/Dual – Dual Slalom (DS) is a ski-inspired event which pits two riders against each other on two identical man-made tracks side by side with the same jumps and berms, with a rider on each track, and the first across the line wins. The contest has a knock-out format. Dual (DL) events are similar, only two riders share the same course/track.
- Mountain bike orienteering (MTB-O or MTBO) is an orienteering sport on a mountain bike where navigation is done along trails and tracks. The major focus becomes route choice while navigating at bike speed. Special equipment used is a map holder attached to the handlebar of the bike. The sport is governed by International Orienteering Federation.
- 24 hour mountain bike races are a form of endurance mountain bike racing where solo competitors or teams race for a period of 24 hours and standings are based on who has ridden the furthest distance in that time (typically, the most number of laps around a loop).
- Freeride – Freeride (FR) competitions are not so much a race as they are a competition of skill and style. Courses contain varying cliffs, drops, obstacles, and ramps. There are usually a large number of ways in which to complete the course, and scoring is dependent on the competitor's choice of routes, the fluidity of riding and tricks performed (style), and sometimes also the time in which the course is completed.

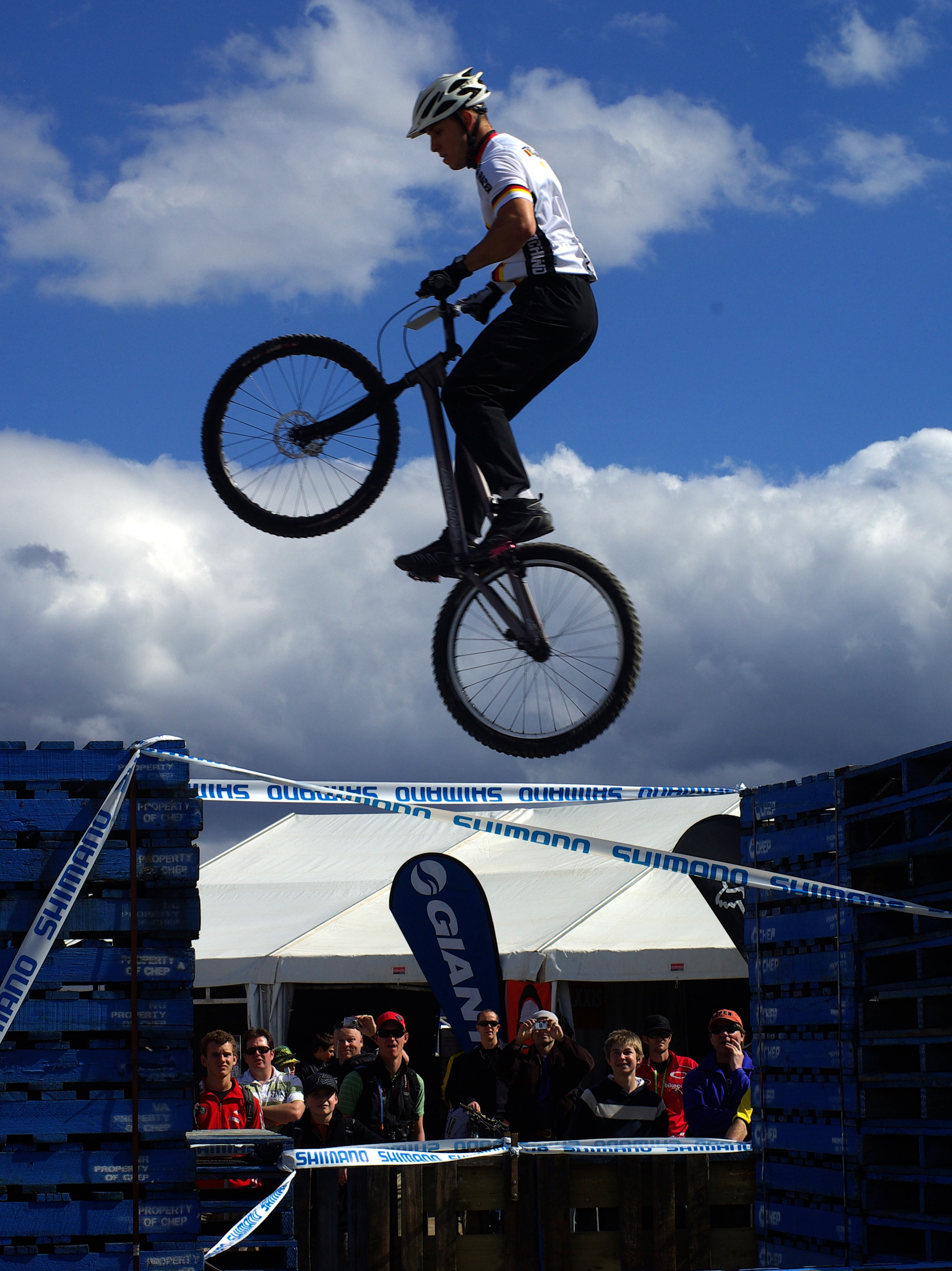
Trials events feature large jumps between artificial obstacles.

- Dirt jumping – Dirt jumping (DJ), similar to freeride, it is a competition of skill, differing that it involves the rider to jump off mounds of dirt to perform the best tricks with the best style. It differs to freeriding that the jumps are usually much larger and designed to lift the rider higher into the air and the bicycle is different from its counterpart.

== Notable events ==
The main events in mountain bike racing are the cross-country event at the Summer Olympics and the World Championships and World Cup organized every year by the UCI at various venues around the World.

There are also other notable events in some countries, like Crankworx, a week-long event in Whistler, British Columbia, Canada; MTB Himalaya in India; Chupacabras, a race in Juárez, Mexico; The Nedbank Tour de Tuli in South Africa, Zimbabwe and Botswana, Cape Epic in South Africa; Sea Otter Classic in the United States; Mountain Mayhem in the United Kingdom; La Ruta de los Conquistadores in Costa Rica and Red Bull Rampage Tour in Virgin, UT.

The International Triathlon Union conducts an annual Cross Triathlon Championship race annually. Additionally, the XTERRA Triathlon is a private off-road series and concluding with a championship each year in Maui.

Electric bicycle races include EDR-E (formerly Enduro World Series's EWS-E), Union Cycliste Internationale's E-Mountain Bike Cross-country World Cup and Fédération Internationale de Motocyclisme's E-Xbike World Cup.

== See also ==
- Cycling
- Mountain biking
- Downhill mountain biking
- Enduro (mountain biking)
- Bicycle motocross
- Single track (mountain biking)
- Bunny hop (cycling)
- Cyclo-cross
- Mountain bike
- Fatbike
- Ebike
- Glossary of cycling
