= Earl Talbot =

Earldom in the Peerage of Great Britain

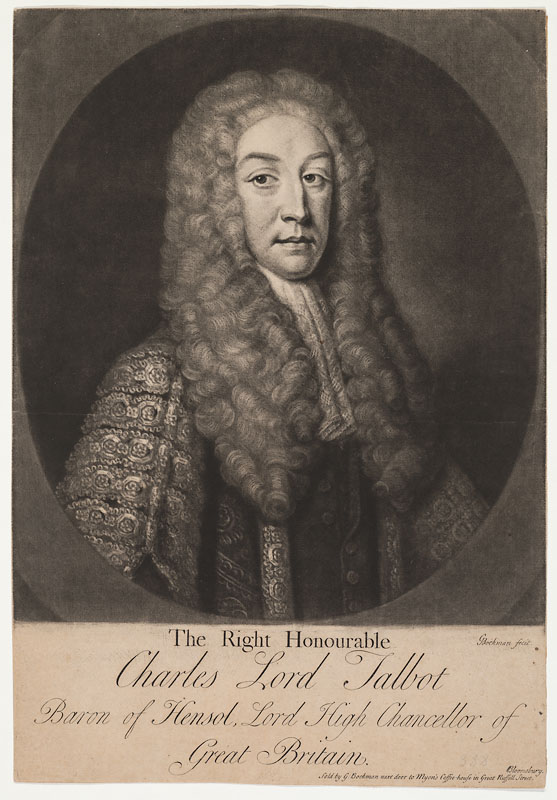
Charles Talbot, 1st Baron Talbot, by Gerhard Bockman.

Earl Talbot is a title that has been created twice in the Peerage of Great Britain. This branch of the Talbot family descends from the Hon. Sir Gilbert Talbot (died 1518), third son of John Talbot, 2nd Earl of Shrewsbury. His great-great-great-grandson, the Right Reverend William Talbot, was Bishop of Oxford, of Salisbury and of Durham. His eldest son Charles Talbot was a prominent lawyer and politician. In 1733, he was raised to the Peerage of Great Britain as Lord Talbot, Baron of Hensol, in the County of Glamorgan, and then served as Lord High Chancellor of Great Britain from 1733 to 1737.

He was succeeded by his eldest son, the second Baron. He served as Lord Steward of the Household from 1761 to 1782. In 1761, he was created Earl Talbot and in 1780, Baron Dynevor, of Dynevor in the County of Carmarthen, in the Peerage of Great Britain. The earldom was created with normal remainder to the heirs male of his body, while the barony was created with remainder to his daughter Cecil, wife of George Rice, and her issue male.

== Subsequent history ==
On William Talbot's death in 1782, the earldom became extinct, while he was succeeded in the barony of Dynevor according to the special remainder by his daughter Cecil (see the Baron Dynevor article for later history of this branch of the family). The barony of Talbot was passed on to his nephew John, the third Baron. He was the son of the Hon. John Talbot (d. 1756), younger son of the first Baron, and his wife the Hon. Catherine Chetwynde, daughter of John Chetwynde, 2nd Viscount Chetwynde. He represented Castle Rising in the House of Commons. In 1784, the earldom was revived when he was made Viscount of Ingestre, in the County of Stafford, and Earl Talbot, of Hensol in the County of Glamorgan. Both titles were in the Peerage of Great Britain. Lord Talbot assumed by Royal licence the surname and arms of Chetwynd in 1786.

On his death, the titles passed to his son, the second Earl. He served under the Earl of Liverpool as Lord Lieutenant of Ireland from 1817 to 1821. He was succeeded by his second but eldest surviving son, the third Earl. In 1856, on the death of his distant relative Bertram Arthur Talbot, 17th Earl of Shrewsbury and 17th Earl of Waterford, he succeeded as eighteenth Earl of Shrewsbury and eighteenth Earl of Waterford. For more information on him and for further history of the peerages, see the Earl of Shrewsbury.

Several members of junior branches of the family have also gained distinction:

- The Hon. John Chetwynd-Talbot, fourth son of the second Earl Talbot, was the father of:

1. John Gilbert Talbot, Member of Parliament from 1868 to 1910, who was admitted to the Privy Council in 1897 and who was the father of:

Sir George John Talbot, a Judge of the High Court of Justice, who was admitted to the Privy Council in 1937, and
Dame Meriel Lucy Talbot, a women's welfare worker, and

2. The Right Reverend Edward Stuart Talbot, Bishop of Winchester from 1911 to 1923, who was the father of

the Right Reverend Neville Stuart Talbot, Bishop of Pretoria from 1920 to 1932.

- the Hon. Rev. George Gustavus Chetwynd-Talbot, fifth son of the second Earl Talbot, was the father of:

1. Gustavus Talbot, Member of Parliament for Hemel Hempstead

== Barons Talbot (1733) ==
- Charles Talbot, 1st Baron Talbot (1685–1737)
- William Talbot, 2nd Baron Talbot (1710–1782) (created Earl Talbot in 1761)

=== Earls Talbot (first creation, 1761) ===
- William Talbot, 1st Earl Talbot (1710–1782)

=== Barons Talbot (1733; reverted) ===
- John Chetwynd-Talbot, 3rd Baron Talbot (1749–1793) (created Earl Talbot in 1784)

=== Earls Talbot (second creation, 1784) ===
- John Chetwynd Chetwynd-Talbot, 1st Earl Talbot (1749–1793)
- Charles Chetwynd Chetwynd-Talbot, 2nd Earl Talbot (1777–1849)
  - Charles Thomas Talbot, Viscount Ingestre (1802–1826)
- Henry John Chetwynd-Talbot, 18th Earl of Shrewsbury, 18th Earl of Waterford and 3rd Earl Talbot (1803–1868)

See Earl of Shrewsbury for further Earls Talbot.

== Family tree ==
Barons and Earls Talbot, Earls of Shrewsbury (2nd creation), Dukes of Shrewsbury, and Earls of Waterford

Baron Talbot (1st creation), 1331)
Gilbert Talbot c. 1276/1277–1346; 1st Baron Talbot
Richard Talbot c. 1306–1356; 2nd Baron Talbot
Gilbert Talbot; 1332–1387; 3rd Baron Talbot
Richard Talbot c. 1361–1396; 4th Baron Talbot	Ankaret le Strange; 1361–1413; 7th Baroness Strange of Blackmere
Earl of Shrewsbury (2nd creation), 1442; Earl of Waterford, 1446
Gilbert Talbot c. 1383–1419; 8th Baron Strange of Blackmere, 5th Baron Talbot,	John Talbot; 1390–1453; 1st Earl of Shrewsbury and Earl of Waterford, 10th Baron Strange of Blackmere, 7th Baron Talbot, 6th Baron Furnivall jure uxoris
Ankaret Talbot d. 1421; 9th Baroness Strange of Blackmere, 6th Baroness Talbot	John Talbot; 1413–1460; 2nd Earl of Shrewsbury and Earl of Waterford, 11th Baron Strange of Blackmere, 8th Baron Talbot, 7th Baron Furnivall
John Talbot; 1448–1473; 3rd Earl of Shrewsbury and Earl of Waterford, 12th Baron Strange of Blackmere, 9th Baron Talbot, 8th Baron Furnivall	Gilbert Talbot; 1452–1517
George Talbot; 1468–1538; 4th Earl of Shrewsbury and Earl of Waterford, 13th Baron Strange of Blackmere, 10th Baron Talbot, 9th Baron Furnivall	John Talbot c. 1485–1549
Francis Talbot; 1500–1560; 5th Earl of Shrewsbury and Earl of Waterford, 14th Baron Strange of Blackmere, 11th Baron Talbot, 10th Baron Furnivall	John Talbot d. 1555	John Talbot d. 1581
George Talbot; 1528–1590; 6th Earl of Shrewsbury and Earl of Waterford, 15th Baron Strange of Blackmere, 12th Baron Talbot, 11th Baron Furnivall	John Talbot of Grafton; 1545–1611	Sherrington Talbot (1577–c. 1642)
Gilbert Talbot; 1552–1616; 7th Earl of Shrewsbury and Earl of Waterford, 16th Baron Strange of Blackmere, 13th Baron Talbot, 12th Baron Furnivall	Edward Talbot; 1561–1617; 8th Earl of Shrewsbury and Earl of Waterford	George Talbot; 1567–1630; 9th Earl of Shrewsbury and Earl of Waterford	John Talbot (d. c. 1607)	William Talbot d. 1686
Alethea Howard; 1585–1654; 17th Baroness Strange of Blackmere, 14th Baroness Talbot, 13th Baroness Furnivall	Thomas Howard; 1585–1646; Earl of Arundel	John Talbot; 1601–1654; 10th Earl of Shrewsbury and Earl of Waterford	William Talbot; 1658–1730
Barons Talbot (1st creation), Barons Furnivall, Barons Strange of Blackmere continued in Dukes of Norfolk family tree
Barons Talbot (2nd creation – of Hensol), 1733
Francis Talbot; 1623–1667; 11th Earl of Shrewsbury and Earl of Waterford	Gilbert Talbot d. 1711	Charles Talbot; 1685–1737; 1st Baron Talbot of Hensol
Duke of Shrewsbury and Marquess of Alton, 1694	Earl Talbot (1st creation), 1761; Baron Dynevor, 1780
Charles Talbot; 1660–1718; Duke of Shrewsbury and Marquess of Alton, 12th Earl of Shrewsbury and Earl of Waterford	Gilbert Talbot; 1673–1743; 13th Earl of Shrewsbury and Earl of Waterford	George Talbot d. 1733	William Talbot; 1710–1782; Earl Talbot and Baron Dynevor, 2nd Baron Talbot of Hensol	John Talbot; 1712–1756
Dukedom of Shrewsbury extinct, 1718	Earldom Talbot (1st creation) extinct, 1782
Earl Talbot (2nd creation) of Hensol in the County of Glamorgan and Viscount of Ingestre, in the County of Stafford, 1784
George Talbot; 1719–1787; 14th Earl of Shrewsbury and Earl of Waterford	Charles Talbot; 1722–1766	Francis Talbot; 1728–1813	John Chetwynd-Talbot; 1749–1793; 1st Earl Talbot and Viscount of Ingestre, 3rd Baron Talbot of Hensol
Charles Talbot; 1753–1827; 15th Earl of Shrewsbury and Earl of Waterford	Joseph Talbot; 1765–1815	Charles Chetwynd-Talbot; 1777–1849; 2nd Earl Talbot and Viscount of Ingestre, 4th Baron Talbot of Hensol
John Talbot; 1791–1852; 16th Earl of Shrewsbury and Earl of Waterford	John Talbot; 1782–1838	Henry Chetwynd-Talbot; 1803–1868; 18th Earl of Shrewsbury and Earl of Waterford, 3rd Earl Talbot and Viscount of Ingestre, 5th Baron Talbot of Hensol
Bertram Talbot; 1832–1856; 17th Earl of Shrewsbury and Earl of Waterford	Charles Chetwynd-Talbot; 1830–1877; 19th Earl of Shrewsbury and Earl of Waterford, 4th Earl Talbot and Viscount of Ingestre, 6th Baron Talbot of Hensol
Charles Chetwynd-Talbot; 1860–1921; 20th Earl of Shrewsbury and Earl of Waterford, 5th Earl Talbot and Viscount of Ingestre, 7th Baron Talbot of Hensol
Charles Chetwynd-Talbot; 1882–1915
John Chetwynd-Talbot; 1914–1980; 21st Earl of Shrewsbury and Earl of Waterford, 6th Earl Talbot and Viscount of Ingestre, 8th Baron Talbot of Hensol
Charles Chetwynd-Talbot b. 1952; 22nd Earl of Shrewsbury and Earl of Waterford, 7th Earl Talbot and Viscount of Ingestre, 9th Baron Talbot of Hensol
James Chetwynd-Talbot b. 1978 styled Viscount Ingestre
George Chetwynd-Talbot b. 2013

== See also ==
- Baron Dynevor
- Viscount Chetwynd
- Baron Talbot
- Richard Talbot, 1st Earl of Tyrconnel
- Talbot baronets
