= John Talbot, 1st Earl of Shrewsbury =

15th-century English nobleman and military officer

John Talbot
- 1st Earl of Shrewsbury
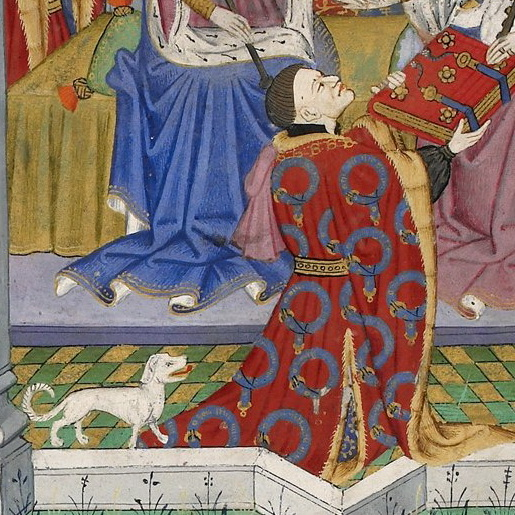
- Detail of illuminated miniature from the Talbot Shrewsbury Book showing John Talbot, 1st Earl of Shrewsbury, KG, identified by a talbot dog, presenting the book to Margaret of Anjou, Queen of England, 1445. His robe displays several encircled Garters.
- Tenure: 20 May 1442 – 17 July 1453
- Other titles: 1st Earl of Waterford; 7th Baron Talbot; 10th Baron Strange; 6th Baron Furnivall
- Known for: Military activity during the Hundred Years' War
- Born: c. 1387; Blackmere castle, Shropshire; 52.97767°N 2.65680°W
- Died: 17 July 1453 (aged 65–66); Castillon-la-Bataille, Gascony
- Cause of death: Slain in battle
- Buried: St Alkmund's Church, Whitchurch
- Offices: Lieutenant of Ireland; Lord High Steward of Ireland; Constable of France
- Spouses: Maud Neville, 6th Baroness Furnivall (m. c. 1407, d. 1422); Margaret Beauchamp (m. 1425)
- Issue: John, 2nd Earl of Shrewsbury; John, 1st Viscount Lisle; Eleanor Butler; Elizabeth, Duchess of Norfolk
- Occupation: Soldier
- Military career
- Allegiance: Kingdom of England
- Branch: English army
- Service years: 1404–1453
- Conflicts: Glyndŵr Rising: Siege of Harlech (1409); Hundred Years' War: Battle of Verneuil (1424); Siege of Orléans (1428–9); Battle of Patay (1429) (POW); Siege of Saint-Denis (1435); Battle of Castillon (1453) †

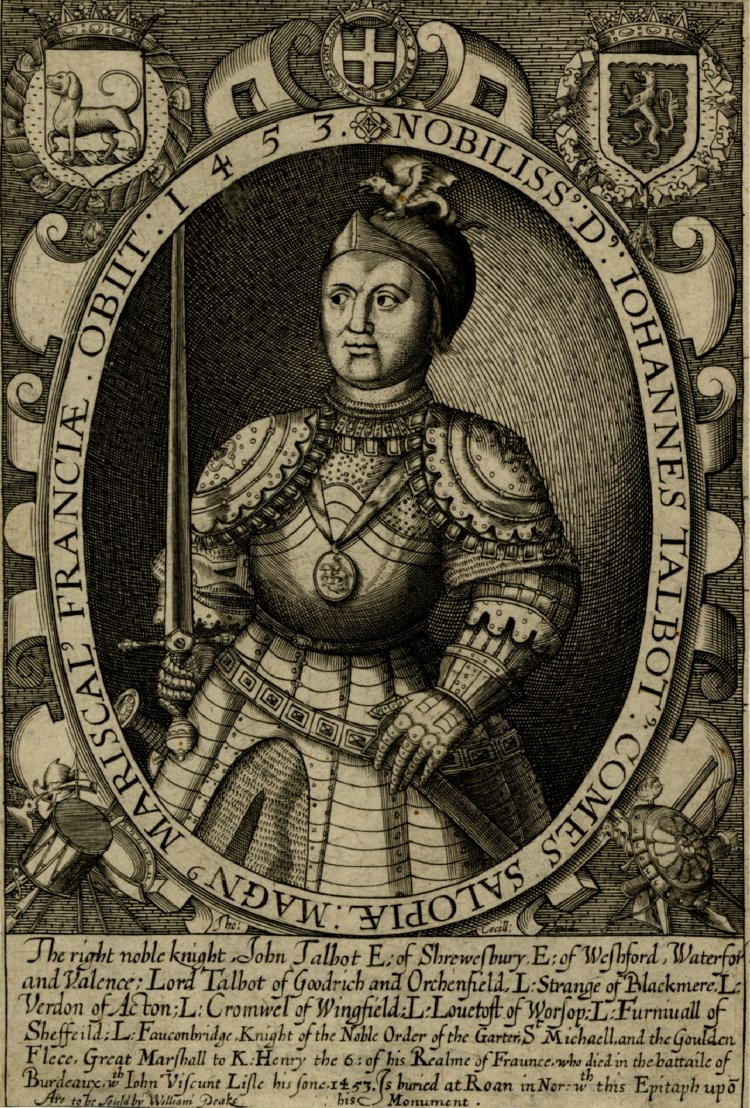
"The right noble knight John Talbot Earl of Shrewsbury". Imaginary engraving made by Thomas Cecill c. 1625–32, British Museum, Cat.no. 1862,1011.234

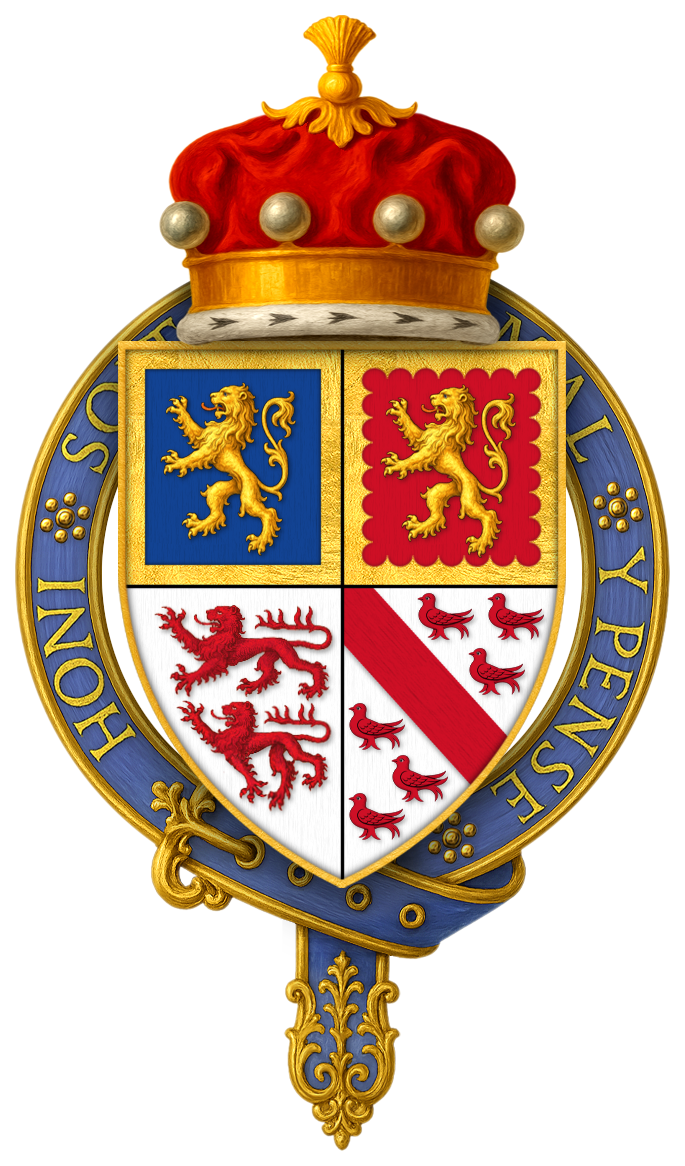
Arms of Sir John Talbot, 7th Baron Talbot, at the time of his installation into the Most Noble Order of the Garter

John Talbot, 1st Earl of Shrewsbury, 1st Earl of Waterford, 7th Baron Talbot, KG (c. 1387 – 17 July 1453), known as "Old Talbot" and "Terror of the French" was an English nobleman and a noted military commander during the Hundred Years' War. He was the most renowned in England and most feared in France of the English captains in the last stages of the conflict. Known as a tough, cruel, and quarrelsome man, Talbot distinguished himself militarily in a time of decline for the English. Called "the English Achilles", he is lavishly praised in the plays of Shakespeare. The manner of his death, leading an ill-advised charge against field artillery, has come to symbolize the passing of the age of chivalry. He also held the subsidiary titles of 10th Baron Strange of Blackmere and 6th Baron Furnivall.

== Origins ==
He was descended from Richard Talbot, the son of William "Le Sire" Talbot, whose estate (wife and infant son Hugh) was a tenant in 1086 of Walter Giffard at Woburn and Battlesden in Bedfordshire. Hugh Talbot, Richard's son, made a grant to Beaubec Abbey, confirmed by his son Richard Talbot in 1153. This Richard (died 1175) is listed in 1166 as holding three fees of the Honour of Giffard in Buckinghamshire. He also held a fee at Linton in Herefordshire, for which his son Gilbert Talbot (died 1231) obtained a fresh charter in 1190. Gilbert's grandson Gilbert (died 1274) married Gwenllian ferch Rhys Mechyll, who was incorrectly assumed to be the sole heiress of the Welsh Prince Rhys Mechyll, whose armorials were of the House of Deheubarth, and which the Talbots thenceforth assumed in lieu of their own former arms. Their son Sir Richard Talbot, who signed the Barons' Letter of 1301, held the manor of Eccleswall in Herefordshire in right of his wife Sarah, sister of William de Beauchamp, 9th Earl of Warwick. In 1331 Richard's son Gilbert Talbot (1276–1346) was summoned to Parliament, which is considered evidence of his baronial status – see Baron Talbot. Gilbert's son Richard married Elizabeth Comyn, bringing with her the inheritance of Goodrich Castle.

John Talbot was born in about 1384 or more likely around 1387, the second son of Richard Talbot, 4th Baron Talbot of Goodrich Castle, by Ankaret, daughter and sole heiress of the 4th Baron Strange of Blackmere. His birthplace was Black Mere Castle (the caput of his mother's estates) near Whitchurch, Shropshire, which is now a scheduled monument listed as Blakemere Moat, site of the demolished fortified manor house. His younger brother Richard became Archbishop of Dublin and Lord Chancellor of Ireland: he was one of the most influential Irish statesmen of his time, and his brother's most loyal supporter during his often troubled years in Ireland. John also had an elder brother, Gilbert (born 1383), who was heir to their parents' baronies of Talbot and Strange.

His father died in 1396 when Talbot was around nine years old, and so it was Ankaret's second husband, Thomas Nevill, 5th Baron Furnivall, who became the major influence in his early life. The marriage (1401) also gave the opportunity of a title for her second son, as Neville had no sons, with the title Baron Furnivall going through his eldest daughter Maud (Talbot's stepsister), who would become John's first wife. Their marriage resulted in John styling himself as John Talbot, 6th Baron Furnivall.

== Marriages and issue ==
Talbot was married before 12 March 1407 to Maud Neville, 6th Baroness Furnivall, daughter and heiress of his stepfather Thomas Nevill, 5th Baron Furnivall, the son of John Neville, 3rd Baron Neville de Raby. The couple are thought to have had six children:

- John Talbot, 2nd Earl of Shrewsbury (c. 1413 – 10 July 1460)
- Thomas Talbot (19 June 1416, Finglas, Ireland – 10 August 1416)
- Lady Katherine Talbot (c. 1418 – c. 1500) married Sir Nicholas Eyton (c. 1405 – c. 1450), Sheriff of Shropshire 1440 & 1449.
- Sir Christopher Talbot (1419 – 10 August 1443)
- Lady Joan Talbot (c. 1422), married James Berkeley, 1st Baron Berkeley
- Lady Ann Talbot, married John Bottreaux, of Abbot's Salford.

By the death of his niece in 1421 he acquired the Baronies of Talbot and Strange. His first wife, Maud, died on 31 May 1422. It has been suggested that she died as an indirect result of giving birth to her daughter Joan, although there is a lack of evidence about Joan's life before her marriage to Lord Berkeley. There is even a theory that she was actually Talbot's daughter-in-law through marriage to Sir Christopher Talbot.

On 6 September 1425, in the chapel at Warwick Castle, he married Lady Margaret Beauchamp, eldest daughter of Richard de Beauchamp, 13th Earl of Warwick and Elizabeth de Berkeley. They had five children:

- John Talbot, 1st Baron Lisle and 1st Viscount Lisle, who was killed along with his father at Castillon on 17 July 1453.
- Sir Louis Talbot (c. 1429 – 1458) of Penyard
- Sir Humphrey Talbot (before 1434 – 1492, Mount Sinai), marshal of Calais. Married Mary, daughter and co-heiress of John Champernoun, no issue. Died probably at Saint Catherine's Monastery.
- Lady Eleanor Talbot (c. February/March 1436 – 30 June 1468) married to Sir Thomas Butler, and mistress or wife of King Edward IV.
- Lady Elizabeth Talbot (c. December 1442/January 1443 – 6 November 1506/10 May 1507). She married John de Mowbray, 4th Duke of Norfolk.

Talbot is known to have had at least one illegitimate child, Henry. He may have served in France with his father as it is known that a bastard son of the Earl of Shrewsbury was captured by the Dauphin Louis on 14 August 1443.

== Early career and service in Ireland ==
From 1404 to 1413 he served with his elder brother Gilbert in the Welsh revolt or the rebellion of Owain Glyndŵr. Meanwhile, he was summoned to Parliament in his wife's right from 1409. Then for five years from February 1414 he was Lord Lieutenant of Ireland, where he did some fighting. He had a dispute with James Butler, 4th Earl of Ormond and Reginald Grey, 3rd Baron Grey de Ruthyn over the inheritance for the honour of Wexford which he held. Complaints were made against him both for his harsh government in Ireland and for acts of violence in Herefordshire, where he was a friend of the Lollard Sir John Oldcastle, and for land disputes with retainers of the Earl of Arundel.

The dispute with the Earl of Ormond escalated into a long-running feud between Talbot and his brother, the Archbishop of Dublin, on the one hand, and the Butler family and their allies the Berkeleys on the other. Relations between the two sides became so poisonous that it was said that real hatred was involved. The feud reached its height in the 1440s, and in the end just about every senior official in Ireland had taken sides in the quarrel. Both sides were reprimanded by the Privy Council for weakening English rule in Ireland: the Council implored them to make up their differences. Friendly relations were finally achieved by the marriage of Talbot's son and heir to Ormond's daughter, Lady Elizabeth Butler.

During John's first term in Ireland, his elder brother Gilbert was serving as a soldier in France. Gilbert died on 19 October 1418 at the siege of Rouen, and his lands were inherited by his only daughter and heiress Ankaret Talbot, John's niece. Ankaret, 6th Baroness Talbot, died shortly after on 13 December 1421 and the Talbot family lands were thus inherited by her uncle John, who became 7th Baron Talbot.

From 1420 to 1424 he served in France, apart from a brief return at the end of the first year to organise the festivities of celebrating the coronation of Catherine of Valois, the bride of Henry V. He returned to France in May 1421 and took part in the Battle of Verneuil on 17 August 1424 earning him the Order of the Garter.

In 1425, he was lieutenant again for a short time in Ireland; he served again in 1446–47. On the latter appointment he was made Earl of Waterford and hereditary Lord High Steward of Ireland.

== Service in France ==
For the first two decades of his career, Talbot acted as a Marcher Lord. His further career in France would garner him more fame.

In 1427 he went again to France, where he fought alongside the Duke of Bedford and the Earl of Warwick with distinction in Maine and at the Siege of Orléans. He fought at the Battle of Patay on 18 June 1429 where he was captured and held prisoner for four years. He was released in exchange for the French leader Jean Poton de Xaintrailles and returned to England in May 1433. He stayed until July when he returned to France under the Earl of Somerset.

Talbot was a daring and aggressive soldier, perhaps the most audacious captain of the age. He and his forces were ever ready to retake a town and to meet a French advance. His trademark was rapid aggressive attacks. He was rewarded by being appointed governor and lieutenant general in France and Normandy and, in 1434, the Duke of Bedford made him Count of Clermont. He also reorganized the army with captains and lieutenants, trained the men for sieges, and equipped them accordingly. But when the Duke of Bedford died in 1435, the Burgundian government in Paris defected to the French, leaving Talbot, known as le roi talbot ("king Talbot") as the main English general in the field.

On 2 February 1436, he led a small force including Sir Thomas Kyriell and Sir Thomas Scales and routed La Hire and Xaintrailles at the battle of Ry near Rouen. Later that year, he did much to recover large portions of land on the Pays de Caux in eastern Normandy which had been lost to the French a few months earlier. On the dawn of 13 February 1437, in spectacular fashion, he took the town of Pontoise north of Paris by surprise, threatening the capital itself for a time. The same year at Crotoy, after a daring passage of the Somme, he put a numerous Burgundian force to flight. At night on 22–23 December 1439, following a surprise flank attack on their camp, he dispersed the 6000-strong army of the Constable Richemont, and on 7 July 1440 he retook Harfleur. In 1441, he pursued the French army four times over the Seine and Oise rivers in an unavailing attempt to bring it to battle.

== Lord Shrewsbury ==
Around February 1442, Talbot returned to England to request urgent reinforcements for the Duke of York in Normandy. In March, under king's orders, ships were requisitioned for this purpose with Talbot himself responsible for assembling ships from the Port of London and from Sandwich.

On Whit Sunday, 20 May, Henry VI created him Earl of Shrewsbury. Just five days later, with the requested reinforcements, Talbot returned to France where in June they mustered at Harfleur. During that time, he met his six-year-old daughter Eleanor for the first time and almost certainly left the newly created Countess Margaret pregnant with another child. From November 1442 to August 1443, he led an unsuccessful siege of Dieppe, which was abandoned after the arrival of a French relief force under Louis, dauphin of France, the future king Louis XI.

In June 1443, Talbot again returned to England on behalf of the Duke of York to plead for reinforcements, but this time the English Council refused, instead sending a separate force under Shrewsbury's brother-in-law, Edmund Beaufort. His son, Sir Christopher, stayed in England where shortly afterwards he was murdered with a lance at the age of 23 by one of his own men, Griffin Vachan of Treflidian on 10 August at "Cawce, County Salop" (Caus Castle).

== The English Achilles ==
He was appointed in 1445 by Henry VI (as the disputed king of France) as Constable of France. Taken hostage at Rouen in 1449 he promised never to wear armour against the French King again. He was true to the letter of his word, but continued to command English forces against the French without personally fighting. In England, he was widely renowned as the best general King Henry VI had. The king relied upon his support at Dartford in 1452, and in 1450 to suppress Cade's Revolt. In 1452 he was ordered to Bordeaux as the king's lieutenant of the Duchy of Aquitaine, and landed there on 17 October. He repaired castle garrisons facing mounting pressure from France, when some reinforcements arrived with his son John, Viscount Lisle in spring 1453, and he captured Fronsac.

== Death ==
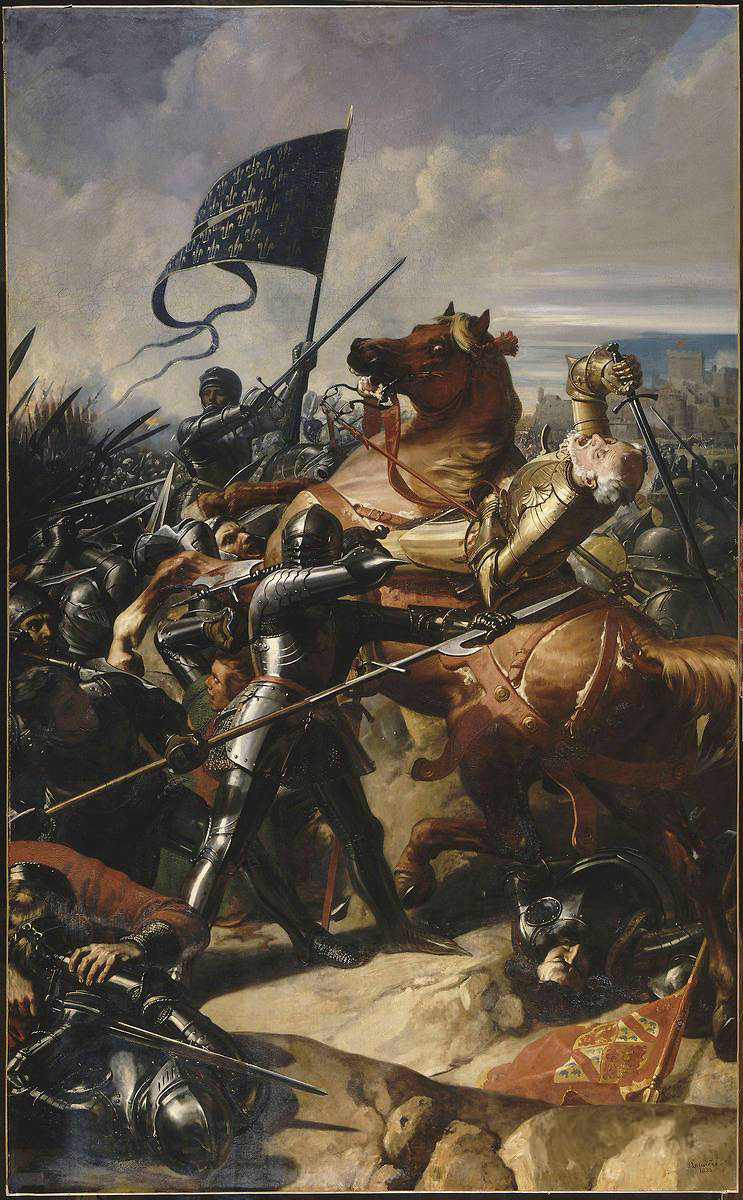
The Death of Shrewsbury at the Battle of Castillon, as portrayed in the 1839 painting The Battle of Castillon by Charles-Philippe Larivière.

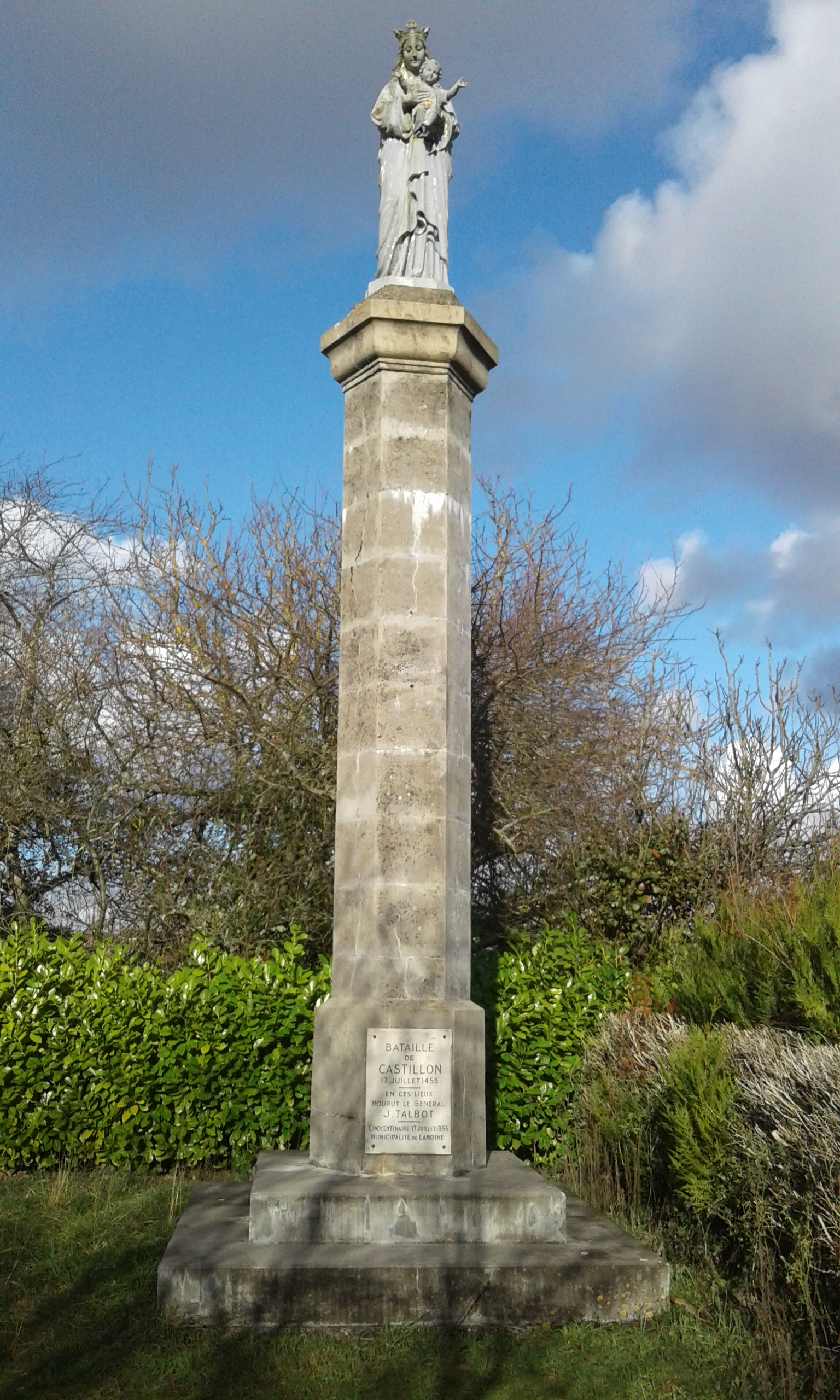
Monument to John Talbot at the battlefield of Castillon

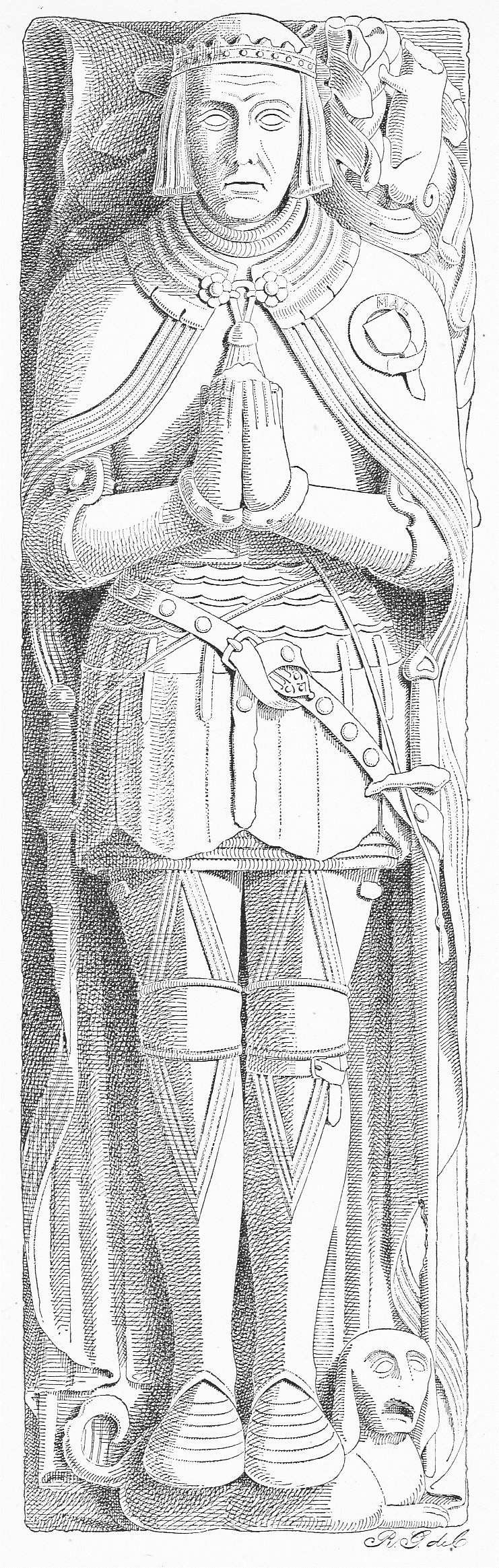
Effigy of John Talbot, 1st Earl of Shrewsbury, KG (died 1453), Whitchurch, Shropshire. A talbot dog is shown as the crest (head missing) on his helmet on which his head rests and also as his footrest.

Talbot was defeated and killed on 17 July 1453 at the Battle of Castillon near Bordeaux, which effectively ended English rule in Aquitaine, a principal cause of the Hundred Years' War. It was reported at the time that when his horse was fatally struck by enemy ordnance, it fell on top of Talbot and pinned him down, enabling a French soldier to finish him off with a battleaxe. His heart was buried in the doorway of St Alkmund's Church, Whitchurch, Shropshire.

The victorious French generals raised a monument to Talbot on the field called Notre Dame de Talbot and a French Chronicler paid him handsome tribute:

"Such was the end of this famous and renowned English leader who for so long had been one of the most formidable thorns in the side of the French, who regarded him with terror and dismay"

– Matthew d'Escourcy

Although Talbot is generally remembered as a great soldier, some have raised doubts as to his generalship. In particular, charges of rashness have been raised against him. Speed and aggression were key elements in granting success in medieval war, and Talbot's numerical inferiority necessitated surprise. Furthermore, he was often in the position of trying to force battle on unwilling opponents. At his defeat at Patay in 1429 he was advised not to fight there by Sir John Fastolf, who was subsequently blamed for the debacle, but the French, inspired by Joan of Arc, showed unprecedented fighting spirit – usually they approached an English position with trepidation. The charge of rashness is more justifiable at Castillon, where Talbot, misled by mistaken reports of a French retreat, attacked their entrenched camp frontally with his advance force, facing wheel to wheel field artillery and refusing to temporarily back off and allow his full force to arrive.

On a political level, his governorship of Ireland degenerated into bitter feuding and personal hatreds. The Crown itself reprimanded him for weakening English rule in Ireland, though he was far from being the only culprit.

== Cultural influence ==
He is portrayed heroically in Shakespeare's Henry VI, Part 1: "Valiant Lord Talbot, Earl of Shrewsbury, Created, for his rare success in arms". Talbot's failures are all blamed on Fastolf and feuding factions in the English court. Thomas Nashe, commenting on the play in his booklet Pierce Penniless, stated that Talbot's example was inspiring Englishmen anew, two centuries after his death,

How would it have joyed brave Talbot, the terror of the French, to think that after he had lain two hundred years in his tomb, he should triumph again on the stage, and have his bones new embalmed with the tears of ten thousand spectators at least (at several times) who in the tragedian that represents his person imagine they behold him fresh bleeding. I will defend it against any collian or clubfisted usurer of them all, there is no immortality can be given a man on earth like unto plays.

=== Fiction ===
John Talbot is shown as a featured character in Koei's video game Bladestorm: The Hundred Years' War, appearing as the left-arm of Edward the Black Prince, in which he assists the former and the respective flag of England throughout his many portrayals.

Talbot appears as one of the primary antagonists in the PSP game Jeanne d'Arc.

== See also ==
- Talbot Shrewsbury Book
- Talbot (dog breed)
- Château Talbot
- HMS Talbot (1895)

== Other sources ==
- Allmand, C T (1983) Lancastrian Normandy, 1415–1450: The History of a Medieval Occupation. New York: Clarendon Press, Oxford University Press, pp. xiii, 349
- Barker, J. (2000) The Hundred Years War
- Bradbury, M. (1983) Medieval Archery
- Elder, A. (1985). "Lancastrian Normandy, 1415–1450: The History of a Medieval Occupation. C. T. Allmand John Talbot and the War in France, 1427–1453. A. J. Pollard". Speculum. 60 (4): 939–941. doi:10.2307/2853735. JSTOR 2853735.
- Mortimer, I. (2008), 1415: A Year of Glory
- Pollard, A.J. (1983) John Talbot and the War in France, 1427–1453, Atlantic Highlands, NJ: Humanities Press, Inc
- Sumption, J. (2004) The Hundred Years War: Trial by Fire vol. 2 of 2
- Talbot, Rev H., (1980) The English Achilles: the life of John Talbot

Political offices
Preceded by Sir John Stanley	Lieutenant of Ireland; 1414–1419	Succeeded by The Earl of Ormond
Preceded by Arthur de Richemont	Constable of France; 1445–1453	Succeeded by The Count of Saint-Pol
New office	Lord High Steward of Ireland; 1446–1453	Succeeded by The 2nd Earl of Shrewsbury
Peerage of England
New creation	Earl of Shrewsbury; 20 May 1442 – 17 July 1453	Succeeded by John Talbot
Preceded by Ankaret Talbot	Baron Talbot; 13 December 1421 – 17 July 1453	Succeeded by John Talbot
Preceded by Ankaret Talbot	Baron Strange of Blackmere; 13 December 1421 – 17 July 1453	Succeeded by John Talbot
Preceded by Thomas Neville	Baron Furnivall jure uxoris (primae); 1407 – 31 May 1422	Succeeded by John Talbot
Peerage of Ireland
New creation	Earl of Waterford; 17 July 1446 – 17 July 1453	Succeeded by John Talbot
