= Baron Talbot =

British peerages

Arms of Talbot: Gules, a lion rampant within a bordure engrailed or. These were the paternal arms of Gwenllian, the daughter and heiress of Rhys Mechyll (d. 1244) (Prince of the Welsh House of Dinefwr, grandson of Rhys ap Gruffydd), and wife of Gilbert Talbot (d. 1274), grandfather of Gilbert Talbot, 1st Baron Talbot (d. 1345/6) assumed by Talbot as arms of alliance of a great heiress, superseding his own former paternal arms of Bendy of 10 pieces argent and gules. The assumption about Gwenllian however was unfounded as Rhys Mechyll also had male heirs who acceded to the arms of the House of Deheubarth

Arms of Talbot (ancient): Bendy of ten argent and gules

Baron Talbot is a title that has been created twice. The title was created first in the Peerage of England. On 5 June 1331, Sir Gilbert Talbot was summoned to Parliament, by which he was held to have become Baron Talbot.

The title Lord Talbot, Baron of Hensol, in the County of Glamorgan, was created in the Peerage of Great Britain in 1733 for Charles Talbot, a descendant of John Talbot, 2nd Earl of Shrewsbury (the 8th Baron of the first creation), the Earl Talbot.

== Barons Talbot (1331) ==
Gilbert Talbot (1276–1346), Lord Chamberlain of the Household to King Edward III, was summoned to Parliament as Lord Talbot in 1331, which is accepted as evidence of his baronial status at that date.

=== Ancestry ===
He was descended from Richard Talbot, a tenant in 1086 of Walter Giffard at Woburn and Battledsen in Bedfordshire. The Talbot family were vassals of the Giffards in Normandy. Hugh Talbot, probably his son, made a grant to Beaubec Abbey, confirmed by his son Richard Talbot in 1153. This Richard (died 1175) is listed in 1166 as holding three fees of the Honour of Giffard in Buckinghamshire. He also held a fee at Linton in Herefordshire, for which his son Gilbert Talbot (died 1231) obtained a fresh charter in 1190. Gilbert's grandson Gilbert (died 1274) married Gwenlynn Mechyll, daughter and sole heiress of the Welsh Prince Rhys Mechyll, whose armorials the Talbots thenceforth assumed in lieu of their own former arms. Their son Sir Richard Talbot, who signed and sealed the Barons' Letter, 1301 held the manor of Eccleswall in Herefordshire in right of his wife Sarah, sister of William de Beauchamp, 9th Earl of Warwick. In 1331 Richard's son Gilbert Talbot (1276–1346) was summoned to Parliament, which is considered evidence of his baronial status.

=== Succession ===
The first baron's grandson, the 3rd Baron Talbot, died in Spain supporting John of Gaunt's claim to the throne of Castile. Richard, the fourth Baron, married Ankaret, 7th Baroness Strange of Blackmere, daughter and heiress of John le Strange, 4th Baron Strange of Blackmere. In 1387, during his father's lifetime, Richard 4th Baron was summoned to Parliament as Ricardo Talbot de Blackmere in right of his wife. His son [Gilbert], the fifth Baron, also succeeded his mother as eighth Baron Strange of Blackmere.

On the early death of the 5th Baron, the titles passed to his daughter, Ankaret, the sixth and ninth holder of the titles. However, she died a minor and was succeeded by her uncle, John seventh Baron Talbot. John married Maud Nevill, 6th Baroness Furnivall, and, in 1409, he was summoned to Parliament in right of his wife as Johann Talbot de Furnyvall. In 1442 John was created Earl of Shrewsbury in the Peerage of England and in 1446 Earl of Waterford in the Peerage of Ireland.

== Barons Talbot (1733) ==
The title was created in 1733 when Charles Talbot was raised to the Peerage of Great Britain as Lord Talbot, Baron of Hensol, in the County of Glamorgan. He was eldest the son of William Talbot, Bishop of Oxford, of Salisbury and of Durham and a descendant of Sir Gilbert Talbot (died 1518), third son of John Talbot, 2nd Earl of Shrewsbury.

The title fell into abeyance between the three daughters of Gilbert Talbot, 7th Earl of Shrewsbury until the deaths of two of them without issue.

== List of titleholders ==
=== Barons Talbot (1331) ===
- Gilbert Talbot, 1st Baron Talbot (1276–1346)
- Richard Talbot, 2nd Baron Talbot (c. 1305–1356)
- Gilbert Talbot, 3rd Baron Talbot (c. 1332–1387)
- Richard Talbot, 4th Baron Talbot (c. 1361–1396)
- Gilbert Talbot, 5th Baron Talbot, 8th Baron Strange of Blackmere (c. 1383–1419)
- Ankaret Talbot, 6th Baroness Talbot, 9th Baroness Strange of Blackmere (died 1421)
- John Talbot, 1st Earl of Shrewsbury, 1st Earl of Waterford, 7th Baron Talbot, 10th Baron Strange of Blackmere (1387–1453) (created Earl of Shrewsbury in 1442)
- John Talbot, 2nd Earl of Shrewsbury, 2nd Earl of Waterford, 8th Baron Talbot, 11th Baron Strange of Blackmere, 7th Baron Furnivall (1413–1460)
- John Talbot, 3rd Earl of Shrewsbury, 3rd Earl of Waterford, 9th Baron Talbot, 12th Baron Strange of Blackmere, 8th Baron Furnivall (1448–1473)
- George Talbot, 4th Earl of Shrewsbury, 4th Earl of Waterford, 10th Baron Talbot, 13th Baron Strange of Blackmere, 9th Baron Furnivall (1468–1538)
- Francis Talbot, 5th Earl of Shrewsbury, 5th Earl of Waterford, 11th Baron Talbot, 14th Baron Strange of Blackmere, 10th Baron Furnivall (1500–1560)
- George Talbot, 6th Earl of Shrewsbury, 6th Earl of Waterford, 12th Baron Talbot, 15th Baron Strange of Blackmere, 11th Baron Furnivall (1528–1590)
- Gilbert Talbot, 7th Earl of Shrewsbury, 7th Earl of Waterford, 13th Baron Talbot, 16th Baron Strange of Blackmere, 12th Baron Furnivall (1552–1616)
- abeyant 1616–1651
- Alethea Howard, 14th Baroness Talbot, 17th Baroness Strange of Blackmere, 13th Baroness Furnivall née Talbot (died 1654)
- Thomas Howard, 5th Duke of Norfolk, 15th Baron Talbot (1627–1677)
- Henry Howard, 6th Duke of Norfolk, 16th Baron Talbot (1628–1684)
- Henry Howard, 7th Duke of Norfolk, 17th Baron Talbot (1655–1701)
- Thomas Howard, 8th Duke of Norfolk, 18th Baron Talbot (1683–1732)
- Edward Howard, 9th Duke of Norfolk, 19th Baron Talbot (1685–1777)
- abeyant since 1777

==== List of co-heirs ====
1777	Winifred Howard, Baroness Stourton	Anne Howard, Baroness Petre
1753	Charles Philip Stourton, 17th Baron Stourton	Anne Howard, Baroness Petre
1787	Charles Philip Stourton, 17th Baron Stourton	Robert Petre, 10th Baron Petre
1809	Charles Philip Stourton, 17th Baron Stourton	William Petre, 11th Baron Petre
1816	William Stourton, 18th Baron Stourton	William Petre, 11th Baron Petre
1846	Charles Stourton, 19th Baron Stourton	William Petre, 11th Baron Petre
1850	Charles Stourton, 19th Baron Stourton	William Petre, 12th Baron Petre
1872	Alfred Stourton, 23rd Baron Mowbray, 20th Baron Stourton	William Petre, 12th Baron Petre
1884	Alfred Stourton, 23rd Baron Mowbray, 20th Baron Stourton	William Petre, 13th Baron Petre
1893	Charles Stourton, 24th Baron Mowbray, 21st Baron Stourton	Bernard Petre, 14th Baron Petre
1908	Charles Stourton, 24th Baron Mowbray, 21st Baron Stourton	Mary Dent, née Petre, 19th Baroness Furnivall
1936	William Stourton, 25th Baron Mowbray, 22nd Baron Stourton	Mary Dent, née Petre, 19th Baroness Furnivall
1965	Charles Stourton, 26th Baron Mowbray, 23rd Baron Stourton	Mary Dent, née Petre, 19th Baroness Furnivall
1968	Edward Stourton, 27th Baron Mowbray, 24th Baron Stourton	Mary Dent, née Petre, 19th Baroness Furnivall
2006	Edward Stourton, 27th Baron Mowbray, 24th Baron Stourton	co-heirs to the barony of Furnivall: Sister Ancilla Dent, OSB; Mrs Patricia Bence
2021	James Charles Peter Stourton, 28th Baron Mowbray, 25th Baron Stourton	co-heirs to the barony of Furnivall: Sister Ancilla Dent, OSB; Mrs Patricia Bence
2025	James Charles Peter Stourton, 28th Baron Mowbray, 25th Baron Stourton	Patricia Bence, née Dent, 20th Baroness Furnivall

=== Barons Talbot (1733) of Hensol ===
- Charles Talbot, 1st Baron Talbot (1685–1737)
- William Talbot, 2nd Baron Talbot (1710–1782) (created Earl Talbot in 1761)
- John Talbot, 3rd Baron Talbot (1749–1793) (created Earl Talbot in 1784)

For subsequent holders see Earl Talbot

== Family tree ==
Barons and Earls Talbot, Earls of Shrewsbury (2nd creation), Dukes of Shrewsbury, and Earls of Waterford

Baron Talbot (1st creation), 1331)
Gilbert Talbot c. 1276/1277–1346; 1st Baron Talbot
Richard Talbot c. 1306–1356; 2nd Baron Talbot
Gilbert Talbot; 1332–1387; 3rd Baron Talbot
Richard Talbot c. 1361–1396; 4th Baron Talbot	Ankaret le Strange; 1361–1413; 7th Baroness Strange of Blackmere
Earl of Shrewsbury (2nd creation), 1442; Earl of Waterford, 1446
Gilbert Talbot c. 1383–1419; 8th Baron Strange of Blackmere, 5th Baron Talbot,	John Talbot; 1390–1453; 1st Earl of Shrewsbury and Earl of Waterford, 10th Baron Strange of Blackmere, 7th Baron Talbot, 6th Baron Furnivall jure uxoris
Ankaret Talbot d. 1421; 9th Baroness Strange of Blackmere, 6th Baroness Talbot	John Talbot; 1413–1460; 2nd Earl of Shrewsbury and Earl of Waterford, 11th Baron Strange of Blackmere, 8th Baron Talbot, 7th Baron Furnivall
John Talbot; 1448–1473; 3rd Earl of Shrewsbury and Earl of Waterford, 12th Baron Strange of Blackmere, 9th Baron Talbot, 8th Baron Furnivall	Gilbert Talbot; 1452–1517
George Talbot; 1468–1538; 4th Earl of Shrewsbury and Earl of Waterford, 13th Baron Strange of Blackmere, 10th Baron Talbot, 9th Baron Furnivall	John Talbot c. 1485–1549
Francis Talbot; 1500–1560; 5th Earl of Shrewsbury and Earl of Waterford, 14th Baron Strange of Blackmere, 11th Baron Talbot, 10th Baron Furnivall	John Talbot d. 1555	John Talbot d. 1581
George Talbot; 1528–1590; 6th Earl of Shrewsbury and Earl of Waterford, 15th Baron Strange of Blackmere, 12th Baron Talbot, 11th Baron Furnivall	John Talbot of Grafton; 1545–1611	Sherrington Talbot (1577–c. 1642)
Gilbert Talbot; 1552–1616; 7th Earl of Shrewsbury and Earl of Waterford, 16th Baron Strange of Blackmere, 13th Baron Talbot, 12th Baron Furnivall	Edward Talbot; 1561–1617; 8th Earl of Shrewsbury and Earl of Waterford	George Talbot; 1567–1630; 9th Earl of Shrewsbury and Earl of Waterford	John Talbot (d. c. 1607)	William Talbot d. 1686
Alethea Howard; 1585–1654; 17th Baroness Strange of Blackmere, 14th Baroness Talbot, 13th Baroness Furnivall	Thomas Howard; 1585–1646; Earl of Arundel	John Talbot; 1601–1654; 10th Earl of Shrewsbury and Earl of Waterford	William Talbot; 1658–1730
Barons Talbot (1st creation), Barons Furnivall, Barons Strange of Blackmere continued in Dukes of Norfolk family tree
Barons Talbot (2nd creation – of Hensol), 1733
Francis Talbot; 1623–1667; 11th Earl of Shrewsbury and Earl of Waterford	Gilbert Talbot d. 1711	Charles Talbot; 1685–1737; 1st Baron Talbot of Hensol
Duke of Shrewsbury and Marquess of Alton, 1694	Earl Talbot (1st creation), 1761; Baron Dynevor, 1780
Charles Talbot; 1660–1718; Duke of Shrewsbury and Marquess of Alton, 12th Earl of Shrewsbury and Earl of Waterford	Gilbert Talbot; 1673–1743; 13th Earl of Shrewsbury and Earl of Waterford	George Talbot d. 1733	William Talbot; 1710–1782; Earl Talbot and Baron Dynevor, 2nd Baron Talbot of Hensol	John Talbot; 1712–1756
Dukedom of Shrewsbury extinct, 1718	Earldom Talbot (1st creation) extinct, 1782
Earl Talbot (2nd creation) of Hensol in the County of Glamorgan and Viscount of Ingestre, in the County of Stafford, 1784
George Talbot; 1719–1787; 14th Earl of Shrewsbury and Earl of Waterford	Charles Talbot; 1722–1766	Francis Talbot; 1728–1813	John Chetwynd-Talbot; 1749–1793; 1st Earl Talbot and Viscount of Ingestre, 3rd Baron Talbot of Hensol
Charles Talbot; 1753–1827; 15th Earl of Shrewsbury and Earl of Waterford	Joseph Talbot; 1765–1815	Charles Chetwynd-Talbot; 1777–1849; 2nd Earl Talbot and Viscount of Ingestre, 4th Baron Talbot of Hensol
John Talbot; 1791–1852; 16th Earl of Shrewsbury and Earl of Waterford	John Talbot; 1782–1838	Henry Chetwynd-Talbot; 1803–1868; 18th Earl of Shrewsbury and Earl of Waterford, 3rd Earl Talbot and Viscount of Ingestre, 5th Baron Talbot of Hensol
Bertram Talbot; 1832–1856; 17th Earl of Shrewsbury and Earl of Waterford	Charles Chetwynd-Talbot; 1830–1877; 19th Earl of Shrewsbury and Earl of Waterford, 4th Earl Talbot and Viscount of Ingestre, 6th Baron Talbot of Hensol
Charles Chetwynd-Talbot; 1860–1921; 20th Earl of Shrewsbury and Earl of Waterford, 5th Earl Talbot and Viscount of Ingestre, 7th Baron Talbot of Hensol
Charles Chetwynd-Talbot; 1882–1915
John Chetwynd-Talbot; 1914–1980; 21st Earl of Shrewsbury and Earl of Waterford, 6th Earl Talbot and Viscount of Ingestre, 8th Baron Talbot of Hensol
Charles Chetwynd-Talbot b. 1952; 22nd Earl of Shrewsbury and Earl of Waterford, 7th Earl Talbot and Viscount of Ingestre, 9th Baron Talbot of Hensol
James Chetwynd-Talbot b. 1978 styled Viscount Ingestre
George Chetwynd-Talbot b. 2013

== See also ==
- Earl of Shrewsbury
- Earl Talbot
- Baron Talbot of Malahide

== Sources ==
- Leigh Rayment's Peerage Pages
- Patrick Cracroft-Brennan, Talbot, Baron (E, 1332 – abeyant 1777), Cracroft's Peerage. Accessed 18 March 2012.
