= Gilbert Talbot =

Gilbert Talbot may refer to:

- Gilbert Talbot (MP for Berkshire), in 1386 represented Berkshire (UK Parliament constituency)
- Sir Gilbert Talbot (soldier) (1452–1518), Tudor Knight of the Garter
- Sir Gilbert Talbot (knight) (b. by 1479–1542) Member of Parliament for Worcestershire 1529–1539 and 1542
- Sir Gilbert Talbot (courtier) (c. 1606–1695), Stuart courtier and Master of the Jewel Office, MP for Plymouth
- Gilbert Talbot, 1st Baron Talbot (1276–1346)
- Gilbert Talbot, 3rd Baron Talbot (c. 1332–1387)
- Gilbert Talbot, 5th Baron Talbot (c. 1383–1419)
- Gilbert Talbot, 7th Earl of Shrewsbury (1552–1616)
- Gilbert Talbot, 13th Earl of Shrewsbury (1673–1743)
- Gilbert Talbot (c. 1895–1915), WWI soldier after whom Christian movement Toc H was named
