= Earl of Shrewsbury =

Title in the English peerage

Earl of Shrewsbury title held with Earl of Waterford and Earl Talbot
- Quarterly, 1st and 4th: gules, a lion rampant within a bordure engrailed or (for Talbot), 2nd and 3rd: azure, a chevron between three mullets or (for Chetwynd).
- Creation date: 1074 (first creation); 1442 (second creation)
- Created by: William I (first creation); Henry VI (second creation)
- Peerage: Peerage of England
- First holder: Roger de Montgomerie, 1st Earl of Shrewsbury (first creation)
- Present holder: Charles Chetwynd-Talbot, 22nd Earl of Shrewsbury
- Heir apparent: James Richard Charles John, Viscount Ingestre
- Remainder to: Heirs male of the first earl's body lawfully begotten
- Subsidiary titles: Viscount Ingestre; Baron Talbot
- Extinction date: 1102 (first creation)
- Seat: Wanfield Hall
- Former seats: Ingestre Hall; Alton Towers; Sheffield Manor; Wingfield Manor; Alton Castle; Barlow Woodseats Hall; Grafton Manor; Heythrop Park />Sheffield Castle
- Motto: Prest d'Accomplir ("Ready to accomplish")

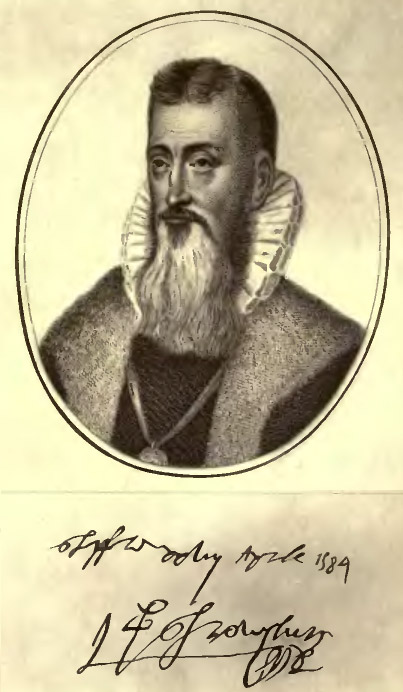
George Talbot, 6th Earl of Shrewsbury (d.1590)

Earl of Shrewsbury (/ˈʃroʊzbəri/) is a hereditary title of nobility created twice in the Peerage of England. The second earldom dates to 1442. The holder of the Earldom of Shrewsbury also holds the title of Earl of Waterford (1446) in the Peerage of Ireland and Earl Talbot (1784) in the Peerage of Great Britain. Shrewsbury and Waterford are the oldest earldoms in their peerages held by someone with no higher title (the oldest earldoms in each peerage being held by the Duke of Norfolk and Duke of Leinster), and as such the Earl of Shrewsbury is sometimes described as the premier earl of England and Ireland.

== History ==
=== First creation, 1074 ===
The first creation occurred in 1074 for Roger de Montgomerie, one of William the Conqueror's principal counsellors. He was one of the Marcher Lords, with the Earl of Hereford and the Earl of Chester, a bulwark against the Welsh; he was granted great powers, and his territory, which extended from Shropshire (of which Shrewsbury is the county town) into Mid-Wales (the county of Montgomeryshire being named after him), was outside the ordinary administration; he was also granted lands across England.

Roger was succeeded in 1094 by his younger son Hugh, his elder son Robert of Bellême succeeding to his lands in Normandy. On Hugh's death in 1098 the earldom passed to his brother Robert.

The title was forfeit in 1102 after the 3rd Earl, Robert, rebelled against Henry I and joined Robert Curthose's invasion of England in 1101.

=== Second creation, 1442 ===
The title was created for a second time in 1442 when John Talbot, 7th Baron Talbot, an English general in the Hundred Years' War, was made Earl of Shrewsbury in the Peerage of England. He was also made hereditary Lord High Steward of Ireland and, in 1446, Earl of Waterford in the Peerage of Ireland (thus, the two titles have always descended together). John Talbot, the first Earl, was succeeded by his son John, the second Earl, who had already succeeded as seventh Baron Furnivall on his mother's death in 1433. Lord Shrewsbury served as both Lord Chancellor of Ireland and Lord High Treasurer of England. He was killed at the Battle of Northampton in 1460 during the Wars of the Roses.

His grandson, the fourth Earl, was Lord Steward of the Household between 1509 and 1538. His son, the fifth Earl, was summoned to the House of Lords through a writ of acceleration as Lord Talbot in 1533, five years before he succeeded his father. On his death the titles passed to his son, the sixth Earl. Lord Shrewsbury was entrusted with the custody of Mary, Queen of Scots, and also served as Earl Marshal from 1572 to 1590. He married as his second wife the famous Bess of Hardwick.

Shrewsbury was succeeded by his son from his first marriage to Lady Gertrude Manners, the seventh Earl. He represented Derbyshire in the House of Commons and served as Lord Lieutenant of Derbyshire. He had no sons and on his death in 1616 the baronies of Talbot, Strange of Blackmere and Furnivall fell into abeyance between his three daughters. He was succeeded in the earldoms by his younger brother, the eighth Earl. He was Member of Parliament for Northumberland. He did not have a male heir either and was succeeded by his distant relative, the ninth Earl. He was the great-great-grandson of Sir Gilbert Talbot (died 1518), third son of the second Earl of Shrewsbury. The family bought Barlow Woodseats Hall in 1593 as part of the estate.

He was succeeded by his nephew, George, the tenth Earl and Lord of Grafton. He was the son of John Talbot of Grafton. On his death the titles passed to his son, the eleventh Earl. He was killed in a duel with George Villiers, 2nd Duke of Buckingham. His son, the twelfth Earl, was a prominent statesman. He was one of the Immortal Seven who in 1688 invited William of Orange to invade England and depose his father-in-law James II and later served under William and Mary as Secretary of State for the Southern Department and Secretary of State for the Northern Department. In 1694 he was created Marquess of Alton and Duke of Shrewsbury in the Peerage of England. The Duke was childless and on his death in 1718 the marquessate and dukedom became extinct.

He was succeeded in his other titles by his first cousin, the thirteenth Earl. He was the son of the Hon. Gilbert Talbot, second son of the tenth Earl. Lord Shrewsbury was in the Holy Orders of the Church of Rome. On his death the titles passed to his nephew George, the fourteenth Earl (who was the son of the Hon. George Talbot). He was childless and was succeeded by his nephew Charles, the fifteenth Earl (who was the son of Charles Talbot). He began in 1812 the creation of the extensive gardens at Alveton Lodge, Staffordshire (later renamed Alton Towers) which estate had been in the family since the 15th century. When he died the titles were inherited by his nephew John, the sixteenth Earl who was the son of the Hon. John Joseph Talbot. When in 1831 the principal home of the family at Heythrop, Oxfordshire was destroyed by fire he moved the family seat to Alton Towers. The sixteenth Earl was also a noted patron of A W N Pugin. He was succeeded by Bertram, his second cousin once removed, the seventeenth Earl who was the great-grandson of the Hon. George Talbot, younger son of the aforementioned Gilbert Talbot (died 1711), second son of the tenth Earl.

Bertram died unmarried at an early age in 1856. By his will he left his estates to Lord Edmund Howard (by Royal Licence from 1876-1922: Talbot), son of the Duke of Norfolk, a will contested by three distant relatives and after a long and expensive legal case the House of Lords ruled in 1860 in favour of Henry John Chetwynd-Talbot, 3rd Earl Talbot, who thus became the eighteenth Earl of Shrewsbury and Waterford. He was a descendant of the aforementioned the Hon. Sir Gilbert Talbot (died 1518), third son of the second Earl of Shrewsbury (see the Earl Talbot for earlier history of this branch). He also held the titles of Baron Talbot, of Hensol in the County of Glamorgan, and Viscount of Ingestre, of Ingestre Hall in the County of Stafford. Lord Shrewsbury was an admiral in the Royal Navy and also served in the second Conservative administration of the Earl of Derby as Captain of the Honourable Corps of Gentlemen-at-Arms (chief whip in the House of Lords) from 1858 to 1859.

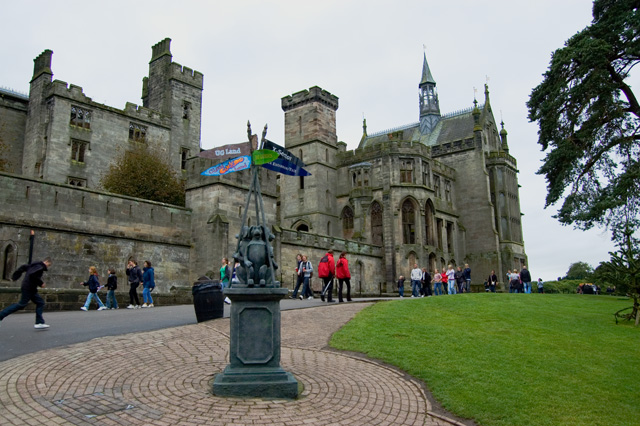
Alton Towers, former seat of the Earls of Shrewsbury, is now part of a theme park.

His eldest son, the nineteenth Earl, also served as Captain of the Honourable Corps of Gentlemen-at-Arms, an office he held from 1874 to 1877 under Benjamin Disraeli. He was succeeded by his son, the twentieth Earl. He caused a scandal in Victorian England by eloping with a married woman, Ellen Miller-Mundy. They were later married. On his death the titles passed to his grandson, the twenty-first Earl. He was the son of Charles John Alton Chetwynd-Talbot, Viscount Ingestre. As of 2017 the peerages are held by the twenty-first Earl's eldest son, the twenty-second Earl, who succeeded in 1980. He is one of the ninety elected hereditary peers that remain in the House of Lords after the passing of the House of Lords Act 1999, and sits on the Conservative benches. He is also hereditary Lord High Steward of Ireland and as the holder of this office is allowed to bear a white staff at the Coronation of the British Monarch.

Lord Shrewsbury is the senior earl on the Roll in the Peerage of England (the more senior earldom of Arundel being held by the Duke of Norfolk). The earldom of Waterford is sometimes called the "Premier Earldom of Ireland on the Roll", as the oldest Irish earldom, that of Kildare, has been a subsidiary title of the Duke of Leinster for centuries and the Earl held the oldest Irish earldom held by anyone ranked as an Earl. If the Viscount Mountgarret proves his presumed claim to the 1328 earldom of Ormonde, the Earls of Shrewsbury would lose this distinction, but they derive higher precedence from their English earldom in any event. Despite holding three differently named earldoms Lord Shrewsbury is always styled simply "The Earl of Shrewsbury".

The seat of the Earls of Shrewsbury was once Alton Towers until it was sold in 1924 by the infant 21st Earl's Trustees. The family seat is still in Staffordshire, near Ashbourne and Uttoxeter.

The family crypt is the Shrewsbury Chapel in Sheffield Cathedral. In 2013, it was discovered that the majority of the Shrewsbury coffins had gone missing from the burial chamber. The current Earl has been appointed High Steward of Sheffield Cathedral. The other family crypt – that of the Chetwynd-Talbot Earls of Shrewsbury – is at the Church of St Mary The Virgin, Ingestre, Stafford.

Three other members of the Talbot family may also be mentioned. The Hon. John Talbot, son of the first Earl of Shrewsbury by his second wife Margaret Beauchamp, was created Viscount Lisle in 1451. Admiral the Hon. Walter Carpenter (who assumed the surname of Carpenter in lieu of his patronymic Chetwynd-Talbot), second son of the eighteenth Earl, was a naval commander and Member of Parliament. Major-General the Hon. Sir Reginald Talbot, third son of the eighteenth Earl, was a soldier, politician and colonial governor.

== Titleholders ==
Arms of Talbot: gules, a lion rampant within a bordure engrailed or. These were the paternal arms of Gwenllian, the daughter and heiress of Rhys Mechyll (died 1244), Prince of the Welsh House of Deheubarth, grandson of Rhys ap Gruffydd, and wife of Gilbert Talbot (died 1274), grandfather of Gilbert Talbot, 1st Baron Talbot (died 1345/6) assumed by Talbot as arms of alliance of a great heiress, who superseded his own former paternal arms of Barry of six argent and gules. The assumption about Gwenllian however was unfounded as Rhys Mechyll also had male heirs who acceded to the arms of the House of Deheubarth.

=== Earls of Shrewsbury, first creation (1074) ===
- Roger de Montgomery, 1st Earl of Shrewsbury (died 1094)
- Hugh of Montgomery, 2nd Earl of Shrewsbury (died 1098)
- Robert of Bellême, 3rd Earl of Shrewsbury (1052–1113) (forfeit 1102)

=== Earls of Shrewsbury, second creation (1442) ===
- John Talbot, 1st Earl of Shrewsbury, 1st Earl of Waterford, 7th Baron Talbot, 10th Baron Strange of Blackmere (1387–1453)
- John Talbot, 2nd Earl of Shrewsbury, 2nd Earl of Waterford, 8th Baron Talbot, 11th Baron Strange of Blackmere, 7th Baron Furnivall (1413–1460)
- John Talbot, 3rd Earl of Shrewsbury, 3rd Earl of Waterford, 9th Baron Talbot, 12th Baron Strange of Blackmere, 8th Baron Furnivall (1448–1473)
- George Talbot, 4th Earl of Shrewsbury, 4th Earl of Waterford, 10th Baron Talbot, 13th Baron Strange of Blackmere, 9th Baron Furnivall (1468–1538)
- Francis Talbot, 5th Earl of Shrewsbury, 5th Earl of Waterford, 11th Baron Talbot, 14th Baron Strange of Blackmere, 10th Baron Furnivall (1500–1560)
- George Talbot, 6th Earl of Shrewsbury, 6th Earl of Waterford, 12th Baron Talbot, 15th Baron Strange of Blackmere, 11th Baron Furnivall (1528–1590)
- Gilbert Talbot, 7th Earl of Shrewsbury, 7th Earl of Waterford, 13th Baron Talbot, 16th Baron Strange of Blackmere, 12th Baron Furnivall (1552–1616)
- Edward Talbot, 8th Earl of Shrewsbury, 8th Earl of Waterford (1561–1617)
- George Talbot, 9th Earl of Shrewsbury, 9th Earl of Waterford (1567–1630)
- John Talbot, 10th Earl of Shrewsbury, 10th Earl of Waterford (1601–1654)
- Francis Talbot, 11th Earl of Shrewsbury, 11th Earl of Waterford (1623–1667)
- Charles Talbot, 12th Earl of Shrewsbury, 12th Earl of Waterford (1660–1718) (created Duke of Shrewsbury in 1694)

=== Duke of Shrewsbury (1694) ===
Also Marquess of Alton

- Charles Talbot, Duke of Shrewsbury, Marquess of Alton, 12th Earl of Shrewsbury, 12th Earl of Waterford (1660–1718)

=== Earls of Shrewsbury, second creation (1442; reverted) ===
- Gilbert Talbot, 13th Earl of Shrewsbury, 13th Earl of Waterford (1673–1743)
- George Talbot, 14th Earl of Shrewsbury, 14th Earl of Waterford (1719–1787)
- Charles Talbot, 15th Earl of Shrewsbury, 15th Earl of Waterford (1753–1827)
- John Talbot, 16th Earl of Shrewsbury, 16th Earl of Waterford (1791–1852)
- Bertram Arthur Talbot, 17th Earl of Shrewsbury, 17th Earl of Waterford (1832–1856)
- Henry John Chetwynd-Talbot, 18th Earl of Shrewsbury, 18th Earl of Waterford, 3rd Earl Talbot (1803–1868)
- Charles John Chetwynd-Talbot, 19th Earl of Shrewsbury, 19th Earl of Waterford, 4th Earl Talbot (1830–1877)
- Charles Henry John Chetwynd-Talbot, 20th Earl of Shrewsbury, 20th Earl of Waterford, 5th Earl Talbot (1860–1921)
  - Charles John Alton Chetwynd-Talbot, Viscount of Ingestre (1882–1915)
- John George Charles Henry Alton Alexander Chetwynd-Talbot, 21st Earl of Shrewsbury, 21st Earl of Waterford, 6th Earl Talbot (1914–1980)
- Charles Henry John Benedict Crofton Chetwynd Chetwynd-Talbot, 22nd Earl of Shrewsbury, 22nd Earl of Waterford, 7th Earl Talbot (born 1952)

The heir apparent is the present holder's son James Richard Charles John Chetwynd-Talbot, Viscount Ingestre (born 1978).
The heir apparent's heir apparent is his son George Henry Charles John Alton Chetwynd-Talbot (born 2013).

=== Line of succession ===
Line of succession (simplified)
- John Talbot, 2nd Earl of Shrewsbury and Waterford (1413–1460)
  - John Talbot, 3rd Earl of Shrewsbury and Waterford (1448–1473)
    - George Talbot, 4th Earl of Shrewsbury and Waterford (1468–1538)
      - Francis Talbot, 5th Earl of Shrewsbury and Waterford (1500–1560)
        - George Talbot, 6th Earl of Shrewsbury and Waterford (1528–1590)
          - Gilbert Talbot, 7th Earl of Shrewsbury and Waterford (1552–1616)
          - Edward Talbot, 8th Earl of Shrewsbury and Waterford (1561–1617)
  - Sir Gilbert Talbot (c. 1452–c. 1518)
    - Sir John Talbot of Albrighton
      - Sir John Talbot of Albrighton and Grafton (d. 1555)
        - Sir John Talbot of Grafton (1545–c. 1611)
          - Fr. George Talbot, 9th Earl of Shrewsbury and Waterford (1566–1630)
          - John Talbot of Longford (d. 1607)
            - John Talbot, 10th Earl of Shrewsbury and Waterford (1601–1654)
            - Francis Talbot, 11th Earl of Shrewsbury and Waterford (1623–1667)
              - Charles Talbot, 1st Duke and 12th Earl of Shrewsbury and Waterford (1660–1718)
            - Hon. Gilbert Talbot (d. September 1711)
              - Gilbert Talbot, 13th Earl of Shrewsbury and Waterford (1672–1743)
              - Hon. George Talbot (d. 12 December 1733)
                - George Talbot, 14th Earl of Shrewsbury and Waterford (1719–1787)
                - Charles Talbot (1722–1766)
                  - Charles Talbot, 15th Earl of Shrewsbury and Waterford (1753–1827)
                  - John Joseph Talbot (1765–1815)
                    - John Talbot, 16th Earl of Shrewsbury and Waterford (1791–1852)
                - Francis Talbot (1727–1813)
                  - Charles Thomas Talbot (1782–1838)
                    - Bertram Talbot, 17th Earl of Shrewsbury and Waterford (1832–1856)
      - Sir John Talbot of Salwarpe (d. 1581)
        - Sherrington Talbot (1577–1642)
          - William Talbot (d. 1686)
            - Rt. Rev. William Talbot (1658–1730)
              - Charles Talbot, 1st Baron Talbot (1685–1737)
                - William Talbot, 1st Earl Talbot (1710–1782)
                - Hon. John Talbot (c. 1712–1756)
                  - John Chetwynd-Talbot, 1st Earl Talbot (1749–1793)
                    - Charles Chetwynd-Talbot, 2nd Earl Talbot (1777–1849)
                      - Henry Chetwynd-Talbot, 18th Earl of Shrewsbury and Waterford, 3rd Earl Talbot (1803–1868)
                        - Charles Chetwynd-Talbot, 19th Earl of Shrewsbury and Waterford, 4th Earl Talbot (1830–1877)
                          - Charles Chetwynd-Talbot, 20th Earl of Shrewsbury and Waterford, 5th Earl Talbot (1860–1921)
                            - Charles Chetwynd-Talbot, Viscount Ingestre (1882–1915)
                              - John Chetwynd-Talbot, 21st Earl of Shrewsbury and Waterford, 6th Earl Talbot (1914–1980)
                                - Charles Chetwynd-Talbot, 22nd Earl of Shrewsbury and Waterford, 7th Earl Talbot (b. 1952)
                                  - (1). James Chetwynd-Talbot, Viscount Ingestre (b. 1978)
                                    - (2). Hon. George Henry Charles John Alton Chetwynd-Talbot (b. 2013)
                                  - (3). Hon. Edward William Henry Alexander Chetwynd-Talbot (b. 1981)
                                - (4). Hon. Paul Alexander Anthony Bueno Chetwynd-Talbot (b. 1957)
                                  - (5). Harry Alexander Alton Chetwynd-Talbot (b. 1985)
                                  - (6). Jack Anthony Alton Chetwynd-Talbot (b. 1987)
                                  - (7). Rory Arthur Alton Chetwynd-Talbot (b. 1995)
                      - Rev. Hon. Arthur Chetwynd-Talbot (1805–1884)
                        - Charles Arthur Talbot (1834–1869)
                          - Arthur Hervey Talbot (1863–1927)
                            - Douglas Hervey Talbot (1882–1927)
                              - Brian Harvey Talbot (1916–2008)
                                - male desc. in succession
                        - Hervey Arthur Talbot (1838–1884)
                          - Arthur Aston Talbot (1881–1918)
                            - Patrick Edward Aston Talbot (1913–1994)
                              - male desc. in succession
                        - Rev. Arthur Henry Chetwynd-Talbot (1855–1927)
                          - John Arthur Chetwynd-Talbot (1905–1993)
                            - John Edward Chetwynd-Talbot (1934–2019)
                              - male desc. in succession
                      - Hon. John Chetwynd-Talbot (1806–1852)
                        - John Gilbert Talbot (1835–1910)
                          - Sir George John Talbot (1861–1938)
                            - Thomas George Talbot (1904–1992)
                              - male desc. in succession
                      - Hon. Sir Wellington Patrick Manvers Chetwynd-Talbot (1817–1898)
                        - Gilbert Edward Chetwynd-Talbot (1876–1950)
                          - Patrick Gilbert Murray Chetwynd-Talbot (1905–1979)
                            - Michael Gilbert Chetwynd-Talbot (1931–2011)
                              - male issue and desc. in succession
                          - Edward Hugh Frederick Chetwynd-Talbot (1909–1998)
                            - male desc. in succession
                      - Hon. Gerald Chetwynd-Talbot (1819–1885)
                        - Charles Alexander Price Chetwynd-Talbot (1842–1903)
                          - Charles Fleming Chetwynd Chetwynd-Talbot (1879–1933)
                            - Charles John Huyshe Chetwynd Chetwynd-Talbot (1910–1991)
                              - male desc. in succession
                          - Gilbert Patrick Chetwynd Chetwynd-Talbot (1886–1958)
                            - Christopher Patrick Chetwynd-Talbot (1922–2011)
                              - male desc. in succession
                - Rev. Hon George Talbot (d. 1782)
                  - Very Rev. Charles Talbot (1769–1823)
                    - Adm. Sir Charles Talbot (1801–1876)
                      - Charles William Talbot-Ponsonby (1843–1927)
                        - Edward Frederick Talbot-Ponsonby (1872–1946)
                          - John Arthur Talbot-Ponsonby (1907–1969)
                            - male desc. in succession
                        - Charles George Talbot-Ponsonby (1874–1937)
                          - Edward Fitzroy Talbot-Ponsonby (1916–1996)
                            - male desc. in succession
                        - Frederick William Talbot-Ponsonby (1879–1930)
                          - Evelyn John Talbot-Ponsonby (1915–1997)
                            - male desc. in succession
                      - Francis Arthur Bouverie Talbot (1851–1916)
                        - Sir Cecil Ponsonby Talbot (1884–1970)
                          - John Talbot (1925–2011)
                            - David John Talbot (1960–2018)
                              - male desc. in succession
                    - George Talbot (1809–1871)
                      - FitzRoy Somerset Talbot (1837–1906)
                        - George Reginald FitzRoy Talbot (1870–1931)
                          - Granville FitzRoy Talbot (1908–1978)
                            - male desc. in succession

== Family tree ==
Barons and Earls Talbot, Earls of Shrewsbury (2nd creation), Dukes of Shrewsbury, and Earls of Waterford

Baron Talbot (1st creation), 1331
Gilbert Talbot c. 1276/1277–1346; 1st Baron Talbot
Richard Talbot c. 1306–1356; 2nd Baron Talbot
Gilbert Talbot; 1332–1387; 3rd Baron Talbot
Richard Talbot c. 1361–1396; 4th Baron Talbot	Ankaret le Strange; 1361–1413; 7th Baroness Strange of Blackmere
Earl of Shrewsbury (2nd creation), 1442; Earl of Waterford, 1446
Gilbert Talbot c. 1383–1419; 8th Baron Strange of Blackmere, 5th Baron Talbot,	John Talbot; 1390–1453; 1st Earl of Shrewsbury and of Waterford, 10th Baron Strange of Blackmere, 7th Baron Talbot, 6th Baron Furnivall jure uxoris	Maud Neville d. 1422; 6th Baroness Furnivall suo jure
Ankaret Talbot d. 1421; 9th Baroness Strange of Blackmere, 6th Baroness Talbot	John Talbot; 1413–1460; 2nd Earl of Shrewsbury and of Waterford, 11th Baron Strange of Blackmere, 8th Baron Talbot, 7th Baron Furnivall
John Talbot; 1448–1473; 3rd Earl of Shrewsbury and of Waterford, 12th Baron Strange of Blackmere, 9th Baron Talbot, 8th Baron Furnivall	Gilbert Talbot; 1452–1517
George Talbot; 1468–1538; 4th Earl of Shrewsbury and of Waterford, 13th Baron Strange of Blackmere, 10th Baron Talbot, 9th Baron Furnivall	John Talbot c. 1485–1549
Francis Talbot; 1500–1560; 5th Earl of Shrewsbury and of Waterford, 14th Baron Strange of Blackmere, 11th Baron Talbot, 10th Baron Furnivall	John Talbot d. 1555	John Talbot d. 1581
George Talbot; 1528–1590; 6th Earl of Shrewsbury and of Waterford, 15th Baron Strange of Blackmere, 12th Baron Talbot, 11th Baron Furnivall	John Talbot of Grafton; 1545–1611	Sherrington Talbot; 1577–c. 1642
Gilbert Talbot; 1552–1616; 7th Earl of Shrewsbury and of Waterford, 16th Baron Strange of Blackmere, 13th Baron Talbot, 12th Baron Furnivall	Edward Talbot; 1561–1617; 8th Earl of Shrewsbury and of Waterford	George Talbot; 1567–1630; 9th Earl of Shrewsbury and of Waterford	John Talbot d. c. 1607	William Talbot d. 1686
Alethea Howard; 1585–1654; 17th Baroness Strange of Blackmere, 14th Baroness Talbot, 13th Baroness Furnivall	Thomas Howard; 1585–1646; Earl of Arundel	John Talbot; 1601–1654; 10th Earl of Shrewsbury and of Waterford	William Talbot; 1658–1730
Barons Talbot (1st creation), Barons Furnivall, and Barons Strange of Blackmere continued in Dukes of Norfolk family tree
Barons Talbot (2nd creation – of Hensol), 1733
Francis Talbot; 1623–1667; 11th Earl of Shrewsbury and of Waterford	Gilbert Talbot d. 1711	Charles Talbot; 1685–1737; 1st Baron Talbot of Hensol
Duke of Shrewsbury and Marquess of Alton, 1694	Earl Talbot (1st creation), 1761; Baron Dynevor, 1780
Charles Talbot; 1660–1718; Duke of Shrewsbury, etc., 12th Earl of Shrewsbury and of Waterford	Gilbert Talbot; 1673–1743; 13th Earl of Shrewsbury and of Waterford	George Talbot d. 1733	William Talbot; 1710–1782; Earl Talbot, etc., 2nd Baron Talbot of Hensol	John Talbot; 1712–1756
Dukedom of Shrewsbury and Marquessate of Alton extinct, 1718; earldoms of Shrewsbury and of Waterford passed to cousin Gilbert Talbot	Earldoms of Shrewsbury and of Waterford passed to nephew Gilbert Talbot	Earldom Talbot (1st creation) extinct, 1782
Earl Talbot (2nd creation) of Hensol and Viscount of Ingestre, 1784
George Talbot; 1719–1787; 14th Earl of Shrewsbury and of Waterford	Charles Talbot; 1722–1766	Francis Talbot; 1728–1813	George Rice; 1724–1799	Cecil de Cardonnel; 1735–1793; 2nd Baroness Dynevor	John Chetwynd-Talbot; 1749–1793; 1st Earl Talbot, etc., 3rd Baron Talbot of Hensol
Charles Talbot; 1753–1827; 15th Earl of Shrewsbury and of Waterford	Joseph Talbot; 1765–1815	George Talbot Rice; 1765–1852; 3rd Baron Dynevor	Edward Rice	Charles Chetwynd-Talbot; 1777–1849; 2nd Earl Talbot, etc., 4th Baron Talbot of Hensol
Earldoms of Shrewsbury and of Waterford passed to John Talbot.
John Talbot; 1791–1852; 16th Earl of Shrewsbury and of Waterford	John Talbot; 1782–1838	George Rice-Trevor; 1795–1869; 4th Baron Dynevor	Francis William Rice; 1804–1878; 5th Baron Dynevor	Henry John Chetwynd-Talbot; 1803–1868; 18th Earl of Shrewsbury and of Waterford, 3rd Earl Talbot, etc., 5th Baron Talbot of Hensol
Earldoms of Shrewsbury and of Waterford passed to second cousin Bertram Arthur Talbot.
Bertram Arthur Talbot; 1832–1856; 17th Earl of Shrewsbury and of Waterford	Arthur de Cardonnel FitzUryan Rice; 1836–1911; 6th Baron Dynevor	Charles John Chetwynd-Talbot; 1830–1877; 19th Earl of Shrewsbury and of Waterford, 4th Earl Talbot, etc., 6th Baron Talbot of Hensol
Earldoms of Shrewsbury and of Waterford passed to distant cousin Henry Chetwynd-Talbot, 3rd Earl Talbot.
Walter FitzUryan Rice; 1873–1956; 7th Baron Dynevor	Charles Henry John Chetwynd-Talbot; 1860–1921; 20th Earl of Shrewsbury and of Waterford, 5th Earl Talbot, etc., 7th Baron Talbot of Hensol
Charles Arthur Uryan Rhys; 1899–1962; 8th Baron Dynevor	David Reginald Rhys; 1907–1991	Charles John Alton Chetwynd-Talbot; 1882–1915 styled Viscount of Ingestre
Richard Charles Uryan Rhys; 1935–2008; 9th Baron Dynevor	Llewelyn Arthur Rhys; 1935–2005	John George Charles Henry Alton Alexander Chetwynd-Talbot; 1914–1980; 21st Earl of Shrewsbury and of Waterford, 6th Earl Talbot, etc., 8th Baron Talbot of Hensol
Hugo Griffith Uryan Rhys b. 1966; 10th Baron Dynevor	Robert David Arthur Rhys b. 1963	Charles Henry John Benedict Crofton Chetwynd Chetwynd-Talbot b. 1952; 22nd Earl of Shrewsbury and of Waterford, 7th Earl Talbot, etc., 9th Baron Talbot of Hensol
Heir presumptive to the Dynevor barony
James Richard Charles John Chetwynd-Talbot b. 1978 styled Viscount Ingestre
Heir apparent to the earldoms of Shrewsbury and Talbot
George Henry Charles John Alton Chetwynd-Talbot b. 2013

== Properties owned by the Earls of Shrewsbury (second creation) ==
The family seat now is Wanfield Hall, near Kingstone, Staffordshire. Previous properties include:

- Alveston Hall hunting lodge (see Alton Towers below).
- Alton Castle, owned by the Earls since the 15th-century; rebuilt in the Gothic-revival style by the 16th Earl; sold to the Sisters of Mercy in 1919.
- Alton Towers, built on the site of Alveston Hall in 1811–14 as the family seat; sold in 1924.
- Barlow Woodseats Hall, bought in 1593; sold in the mid-1600s.
- Grafton Manor, seat of John Talbot of Grafton's son George before inheriting the title; sold in 1934.
- Heythrop Park, developed as the family seat in 1700–1705; burnt down in 1831 and sold in 1870.
- Ingestre Hall, inherited by marriage to the Chetwynd family in 1748; sold to Sandwell Metropolitan Borough Council.
- Shrewsbury Place or Shrewsbury House, Isleworth bought by kinsman Sir John Talbot, 1678, passed to the Protestant Duke of Shrewsbury (died 1718), and to the Roman Catholic George Talbot (died 1733), often known in his lifetime as Earl of Shrewsbury. His widow continued to live at Isleworth until her death in 1752, and it was as her chaplain that the first recorded priest ministered in Isleworth. The house was a Catholic boys school by 1770 and demolished by 1810.

== Arms ==
Coat of arms of Earl of Shrewsbury
Coronet A Coronet of an Earl Crest 1st: on a Chapeau Gules turned up Ermine a Lion statant with the tail extended Or (Talbot); 2nd: a Goat's Head erased Argent attired Or (Chetwynd) Escutcheon Quarterly: 1st and 4th, Gules a Lion rampant within a Bordure engrailed Or (Talbot); 2nd and 3rd, Azure a Chevron between three Mullets Or (Chetwynd) Supporters On either side a Talbot Argent Motto Prest d'Accomplir ("Ready to accomplish")

== See also ==
- Earl Talbot
- Baron Talbot
- Viscount Lisle
- Baron Furnivall
- Baron Strange of Blackmere
- Countess of Shrewsbury

== Notes ==
Secondary sources

- Mosley, Charles (1999). Peerage and Baronetage. Vol. 2 vols (106th ed.).
- Mosley, Charles (2003). Peerage and Baronetage. Vol. 2 vols (107th ed.).
- Cokayne, George E.; Vicary Gibbs, Peter; Doubleday, Harry; de Walden, Lord Howard (1958). The Complete Peerage of England, Scotland, Ireland, and Great Britain and Ireland, extant, abeyant, dormant and extinct. Vol. XIV vols.
