= Elizabeth de Comyn =

English noblewoman

- Born: 1 November 1299
- Died: 20 November 1372 (aged 73)
- Spouse: Richard Talbot, 2nd Baron Talbot
- Issue: Gilbert Talbot, 3rd Baron Talbot
- Father: John III Comyn, Lord of Badenoch
- Mother: Joan de Valence

Elizabeth de Comyn (1 November 1299 – 20 November 1372) was a medieval noblewoman and heiress, notable for being kidnapped by the Despenser family towards the end of the reign of King Edward II.

== Background ==
Elizabeth was born to John III Comyn, Lord of Badenoch, also known as the "Red Comyn", a powerful Scottish nobleman related to the Scottish crown, and Joan de Valence, the daughter of the French knight William de Valence, 1st Earl of Pembroke. She was the youngest of three children, with an elder sister, Joan de Comyn, and brother, John de Comyn. Her father was stabbed to death in 1306 by Robert the Bruce and Elizabeth and her siblings were sent south to England for their own safety. Joan married David II Strathbogie, the earl of Atholl, whilst her brother John later died at the Battle of Bannockburn in 1314, fighting Robert.

== Inheritance and kidnap ==
In 1324 Elizabeth's maternal uncle, Aymer de Valence, 2nd Earl of Pembroke, died. Since he had no surviving children, Aymer's considerable lands were then divided amongst his sisters; Isabel de Valence had died in 1305, leaving her share to her son, John Hastings, 2nd Baron Hastings, whilst Elizabeth's mother left lands to her daughters Joan and Elizabeth. Joan inherited the manor and castle of Mitford, the manor of Ponteland, and lands in Little Eland, and the manor of Foston. Elizabeth inherited the powerful fortress of Goodrich Castle and the manor of Painswick.

By the mid-1320s, however, England was in the grip of the oppressive rule of the Marcher lords Hugh le Despenser the older and his son Hugh Despenser the younger, the royal favourites of King Edward II. As part of a "sweeping revenge" on their rivals, especially in the Marches, the Despensers illegally seized a wide range of properties, particularly from vulnerable targets such as widows, or wives whose husbands were out of favour with the king.

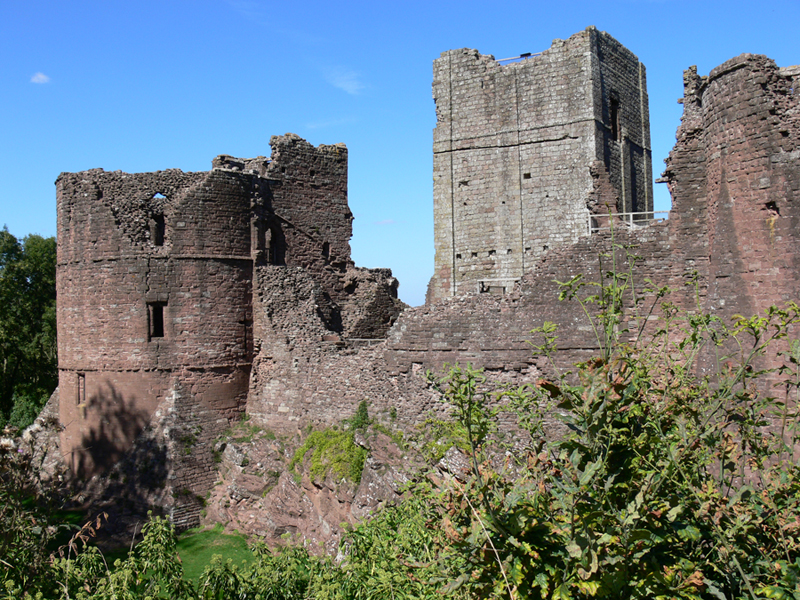
Elizabeth de Comyn was held by the Despensers in an attempt to gain ownership of the powerful castle of Goodrich, shown here.

John Hastings was effectively controlled by the Despensers and they ensured that he inherited an unequally large settlement of the Pembroke lands, anticipating that they would be able to marry him into their family and thereby acquire control of the estates themselves. To deal with Elizabeth, however, stronger measures were necessary. Upon her inheritance, Hugh le Despenser the younger promptly kidnapped Elizabeth in London and transported her to Herefordshire to be imprisoned in her own castle at Goodrich. Threatened with death, Elizabeth was finally forced to sign over the castle and other lands to the Despensers on 20 April 1325. She was also forced to sign a debt notice of £10,000, a huge sum, which was witnessed by John de Bousser, a corrupt royal justice.

Released, Elizabeth then married the English knight Richard Talbot, the 2nd Baron Talbot. Queen Isabella of France landed in England in late 1326 and deposed both the Despensers and her husband Edward II; Richard promptly seized Goodrich Castle from the Despensers, and Talbot and Elizabeth regained their legal title to the castle the following year. The Despensers were both executed on the queen's orders.

== Later years ==
Elizabeth and Richard did well in the coming years. They had a son, Gilbert, in 1332. Richard progressed at court under Edward III and eventually became a royal steward. After Richard's death in 1356, Elizabeth remarried to Sir John Bromwich. She died in 1372. Elizabeth's heraldic device was three garbs, which she maintained as her own, rather than adopting her husbands'.

== Bibliography ==
- Brayley, Edward William and William Tombleson. (1823) A Series of Views of the Most Interesting Remains of Ancient Castles of England and Wales. London: Longman.
- Doherty, P.C. (2003) Isabella and the Strange Death of Edward II. London: Robinson.
- Hull, Lise and Stephen Whitehorne. (2008) Great Castles of Britain & Ireland. London: New Holland Publishers.
- Fryde, Natalie. (2003) The Tyranny and Fall of Edward II 1321-1326. Cambridge: Cambridge University Press.
- McAndrew, Bruce A. (2006) Scotland's historic heraldry. Woodbridge: Boydell Press.
- Prestwich, Michael. (2007) Plantagenet England 1225-1360. Oxford: Oxford University Press.
- Rickard, John. (2002) The Castle Community: the Personnel of English and Welsh Castles, 1272-1422. Woodbridge: Boydell Press.
- Underhill, Frances Ann. (1999) For her good estate: the life of Elizabeth de Burgh. London: Palgrave Macmillna.
- Weir, Alison. (2006) Queen Isabella: She-Wolf of France, Queen of England. London: Pimlico Books.
