= Richard Talbot (died 1306) =

English noble

Coat of arms of Richard Talbot, Lord of Eccleswall, Gules, a lion rampant or, a bordure engrailed of the last..

Richard Talbot (died 1306), Lord of Eccleswall was an English noble. He fought in the wars in Wales, Gascony and Scotland. He was a signatory of the Baron's Letter to Pope Boniface VIII in 1301.

== Biography ==
Richard was the eldest son of Gilbert Talbot and Gwenthlian Mechyll. He served in Wales in 1282, Gascony in 1295. He was Governor of Cardiff Castle and Sheriff of Gloucestershire (1300-1301) and was a signatory of the Baron's Letter to Pope Boniface VIII in 1301.

He died in 1306 and was succeeded by his eldest son Gilbert.

== Marriage and issue ==
Richard married Sarah, daughter of William Beauchamp of Elmley and Isabel Mauduit, they had the following issue:

- Gilbert Talbot, married Anne Boteler, had issue.
- Richard Talbot, married Joan de Mortimer, had issue.
- Thomas Talbot, canon.
- Eleanor Talbot, married Nicholas Carew, had issue.
