= Baron Strange of Blackmere =

Baron Strange of Blackmere is an abeyant title in the Peerage of England.

== History ==
The title was created on 13 January 1309 when Fulk le Strange was summoned to parliament. On the death of the fifth baron in 1375, it was inherited by Elizabeth Mowbray, née le Strange. On her death in the year 1383, it was inherited by Ankaret Talbot, née le Strange, daughter of the fourth Baron. On her son's death in 1419, the baron was inherited by Ankaret Talbot, his daughter. On her death in 1421, the barony was inherited by her uncle, John Talbot who was created Earl of Shrewsbury, Earl of Waterford and hereditary Lord High Steward of Ireland. On the death of the 7th earl in 1616, the barony fell into abeyance between his three daughters Mary, Elizabeth and Alethea. In 1651 Alethea became sole heir and therefore, Baroness Strange of Blackmere. The title continued in her descendants until the death of Edward Howard, 9th Duke of Norfolk and 22nd Baron Strange of Blackmere in 1777, when it again fell into abeyance. The co-heirs are the descendants of his nieces Winifred, Lady Stourton, and Ann, Lady Petre.

== Titleholders ==
=== Barons Strange of Blackmere (1309) ===
Arms of Baron Strange de Blackmere: Argent two lions passant in pale gules

- Fulk le Strange, 1st Baron Strange of Blackmere (1267–1324)
- John le Strange, 2nd Baron Strange of Blackmere (1305–1349)
- Fulk le Strange, 3rd Baron Strange of Blackmere (1320–1349)
- John le Strange, 4th Baron Strange of Blackmere (1332–1361)
- John le Strange, 5th Baron Strange of Blackmere (1353–1375)
- Elizabeth Mowbray, 6th Baroness Strange of Blackmere née le Strange (1373–1383)
- Ankaret Talbot, 7th Baroness Strange of Blackmere née le Strange (1361–1413) (daughter of the 4th Baron Strange)
- Gilbert Talbot, 5th Baron Talbot, 8th Baron Strange of Blackmere (1383–1419)
- Ankaret Talbot, 6th Baroness Talbot, 9th Baroness Strange of Blackmere (1416–1421)
- John Talbot, 1st Earl of Shrewsbury, 1st Earl of Waterford, 7th Baron Talbot, 10th Baron Strange of Blackmere (1390–1453) (second son of the 7th Baroness Strange)
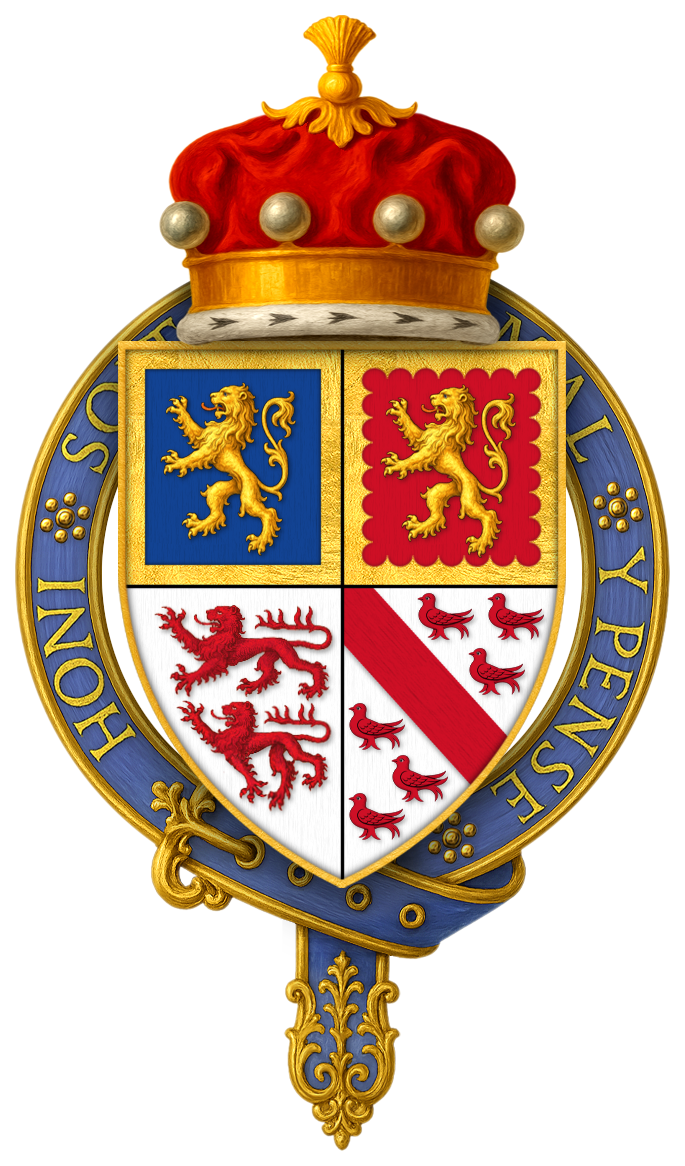
  Arms of Sir John Talbot, 10th Baron Strange of Blackmere, at the time of his installation into the Most Noble Order of the Garter
- John Talbot, 2nd Earl of Shrewsbury, 2nd Earl of Waterford, 8th Baron Talbot, 11th Baron Strange of Blackmere, 7th Baron Furnivall (1413–1460)
- John Talbot, 3rd Earl of Shrewsbury, 3rd Earl of Waterford, 9th Baron Talbot, 12th Baron Strange of Blackmere, 8th Baron Furnivall (1448–1473)
- George Talbot, 4th Earl of Shrewsbury, 4th Earl of Waterford, 10th Baron Talbot, 13th Baron Strange of Blackmere, 9th Baron Furnivall (1468–1538)
- Francis Talbot, 5th Earl of Shrewsbury, 5th Earl of Waterford, 11th Baron Talbot, 14th Baron Strange of Blackmere, 10th Baron Furnivall (1500–1560)
- George Talbot, 6th Earl of Shrewsbury, 6th Earl of Waterford, 12th Baron Talbot, 15th Baron Strange of Blackmere, 11th Baron Furnivall (1522–1590)
- Gilbert Talbot, 7th Earl of Shrewsbury, 7th Earl of Waterford, 13th Baron Talbot, 16th Baron Strange of Blackmere, 12th Baron Furnivall (1552–1616) (abeyant 1616)
- Alethea Howard, Countess of Arundel, 14th Baroness Talbot, 17th Baroness Strange of Blackmere, 13th Baroness Furnivall née Talbot (1585–1654) (abeyance naturally terminated 1651)
- Thomas Howard, 5th Duke of Norfolk, 18th Baron Strange of Blackmere (1627–1677)
- Henry Howard, 6th Duke of Norfolk, 19th Baron Strange of Blackmere (1628–1684)
- Henry Howard, 7th Duke of Norfolk, 20th Baron Strange of Blackmere (1655–1701)
- Thomas Howard, 8th Duke of Norfolk, 21st Baron Strange of Blackmere (1683–1732)
- Edward Howard, 9th Duke of Norfolk, 22nd Baron Strange of Blackmere (1686–1777)
- abeyant since 1777

=== List of co-heirs ===
1777	Winifred Howard, Baroness Stourton	Anne Howard, Baroness Petre
1753	Charles Philip Stourton, 17th Baron Stourton	Anne Howard, Baroness Petre
1787	Charles Philip Stourton, 17th Baron Stourton	Robert Petre, 10th Baron Petre
1809	Charles Philip Stourton, 17th Baron Stourton	William Petre, 11th Baron Petre
1816	William Stourton, 18th Baron Stourton	William Petre, 11th Baron Petre
1846	Charles Stourton, 19th Baron Stourton	William Petre, 11th Baron Petre
1850	Charles Stourton, 19th Baron Stourton	William Petre, 12th Baron Petre
1872	Alfred Stourton, 23rd Baron Mowbray, 20th Baron Stourton	William Petre, 12th Baron Petre
1884	Alfred Stourton, 23rd Baron Mowbray, 20th Baron Stourton	William Petre, 13th Baron Petre
1893	Charles Stourton, 24th Baron Mowbray, 21st Baron Stourton	Bernard Petre, 14th Baron Petre
1908	Charles Stourton, 24th Baron Mowbray, 21st Baron Stourton	Mary Dent, née Petre, 19th Baroness Furnivall
1936	William Stourton, 25th Baron Mowbray, 22nd Baron Stourton	Mary Dent, née Petre, 19th Baroness Furnivall
1965	Charles Stourton, 26th Baron Mowbray, 23rd Baron Stourton	Mary Dent, née Petre, 19th Baroness Furnivall
1968	Edward Stourton, 27th Baron Mowbray, 24th Baron Stourton	Mary Dent, née Petre, 19th Baroness Furnivall
2006	Edward Stourton, 27th Baron Mowbray, 24th Baron Stourton	Mrs Patricia Bence, 20th Baroness Furnivall, who has a son, Francis Hornsby.
2021	James Charles Peter Stourton, 28th Baron Mowbray, 25th Baron Stourton	Mrs Patricia Bence, 20th Baroness Furnivall, who has a son, Francis Hornsby.
