= Thomas Cecil (engraver) =

English engraver

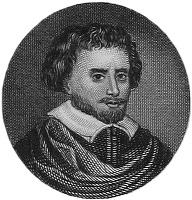
Thomas Cecil

Thomas Cecil (fl. 1626 – 1640) was an English engraver who worked entirely with the graver, and whose work flourished about 1630.

== Works ==
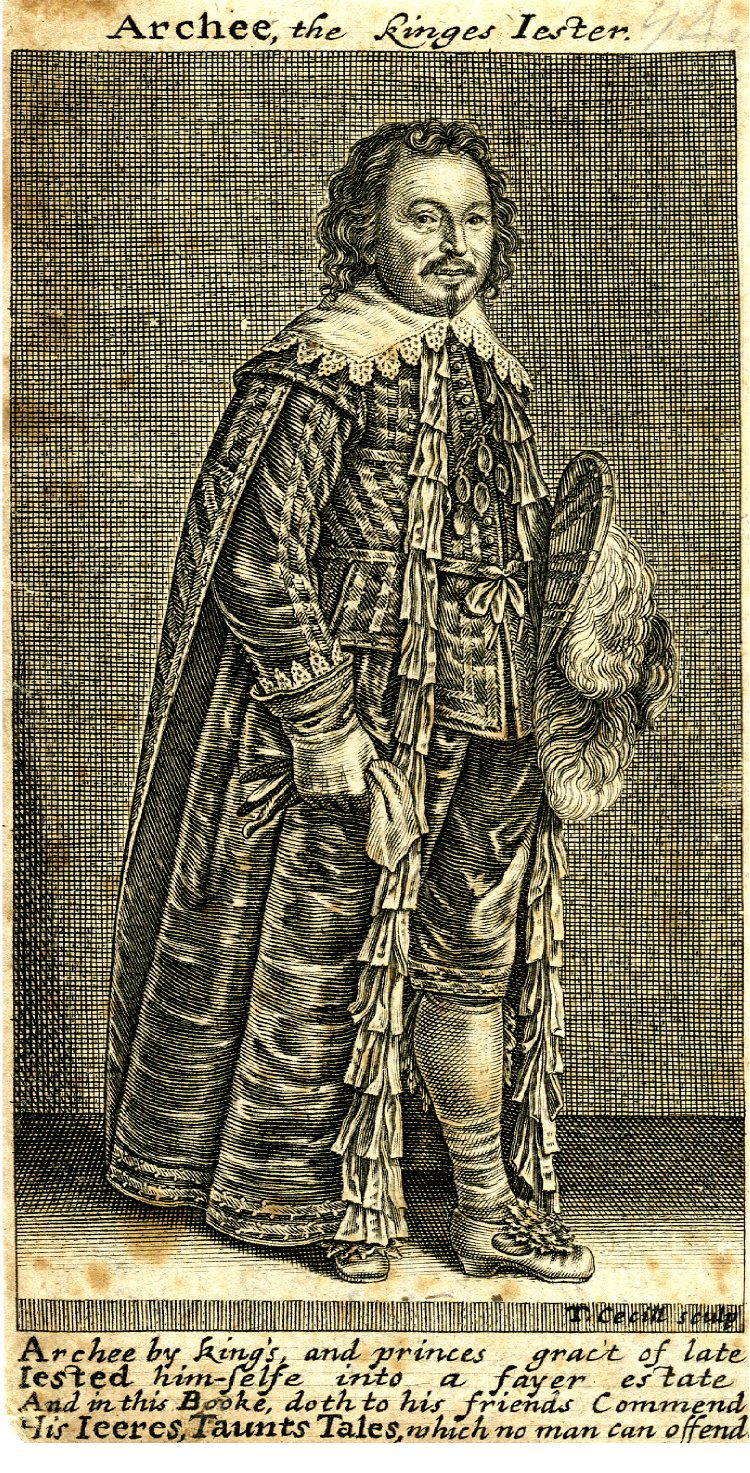
Archibald Armstrong engraved by Thomas Cecil.

His engravings are finely executed, among them the first edition of Thomas Heywood's 1635 Hierarchie of the Bleesed Angels and Thomas Kedermister of Langley, dated 1628. He was working in London from 1627 to 1635. The portrait of Henry VIII prefixed to some copies of the first edition of Lord Herbert of Cherbury's History of Henry is by Cecil. His portraits are often from his own drawings.
