= Ancilla Dent =

English Roman Catholic nun and writer (1933–2025)

Sister Ancilla Dent, OSB (3 June 1933 – 15 October 2025) was an English Roman Catholic nun, ecological activist and writer.

== Biography ==
Born as The Honourable Rosamond Mary Dent, she took the religious name of Sister Ancilla upon becoming a Benedictine nun. She was a nun at St Mildred's Abbey, Minster-in-Thanet in Kent, England. The elder daughter of William Herbert Shelley Dent and Mary Frances Katherine Petre, Baroness Furnivall (27 May 1900–24 24 December 1968), her younger sister, Mrs. Patricia Mary Bence (b. 4 April 1935), is the 20th Baroness Furnivall.

Sister Ancilla Dent died on 15 October 2025, at the age of 92.

== Publications ==
=== Book ===
- Ecology and Faith: The Writings of Pope John Paul II, edited by Sister Ancilla Dent, (publ. Berkhamsted, England: Arthur James, 1997). ISBN 0-85305-410-X

=== Green Christians articles ===
- Bernard of Clairvaux
- Holy Wells and Celtic Saints
- Gregory of Nyssa
- Ecological crisis at Minster Abbey, Ramsgate
