= John Talbot, 2nd Earl of Shrewsbury =

English nobleman and soldier (1413–1460)

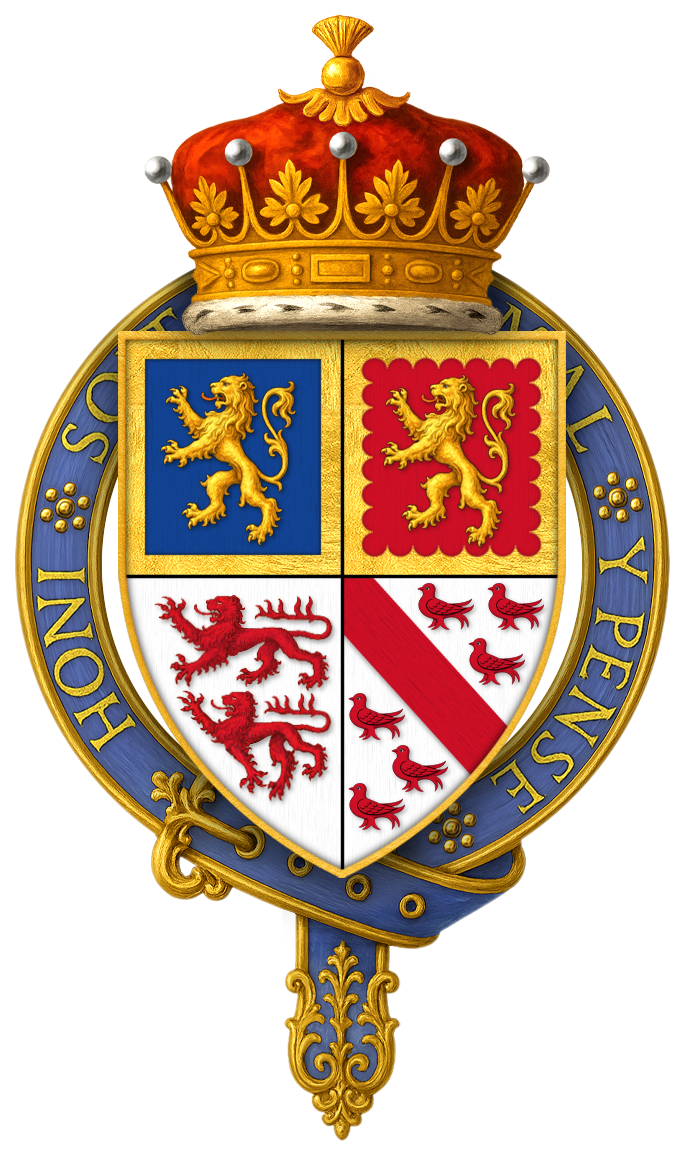
Arms of Sir John Talbot, 2nd Earl of Shrewsbury, KG.

John Talbot was the 2nd Earl of Shrewsbury, 2nd Earl of Waterford, 8th Baron Talbot, KG (12 December 1413 – 10 July 1460) was an English nobleman and soldier and the son of John Talbot, 1st Earl of Shrewsbury, 1st Earl of Waterford, 7th Baron Talbot, 10th Baron Strange of Blackmere, and Maud Neville, 6th Baroness Furnivall.

John Talbot also held the subsidiary titles of 11th Baron Strange of Blackmere and 7th Baron Furnivall. He was knighted in 1426 at Leicester alongside King Henry VI. During his father's lifetime, he served as Lord Chancellor of Ireland. He was a member of the House of Lancaster or Lancastrian and served as Lord High Treasurer from 1456 to 1458. Additionally, he was created a Knight of the Garter in 1457 and appointed to the council of Edward of Westminster, Prince of Wales. He was killed at the Battle of Northampton.

== Early life ==
The eldest son and heir to the Barony of Furnivall, Talbot was born at Sheffield Castle, where his mother was a resident. Still a boy, he was knighted in 1426 by Henry VI. He was granted the manor of Worksop in 1435/6 aeternas maternis belonged to his mother in her own lifetime. He made his will at Sheffield the year after marriage to Lady Elizabeth, a daughter of James Butler, 4th Earl of Ormonde and Joan de Beauchamp. Her maternal grandparents were William Beauchamp, 1st Baron Bergavenny and Joan Fitzalan. Joan was a daughter of Richard FitzAlan, 11th Earl of Arundel and Elizabeth de Bohun. Elizabeth was a daughter of William de Bohun, 1st Earl of Northampton.

The marriage between John and Elizabeth seems to have been an attempt to heal the old feud between the Talbot and Butler families, which had dominated Irish politics for many years and greatly weakened the authority of the English Crown in Ireland.

They had seven children:

- Lady Anne Talbot (c. 1445 – 17 May 1494). Married firstly Sir Henry Vernon and secondly Ralph Shirley.
- John Talbot, 3rd Earl of Shrewsbury (12 December 1448 – 28 June 1473).
- Sir James Talbot (c. 1450 – 2 September 1471).
- Sir Gilbert Talbot, KG (1452 – 16 August 1517 or 19 September 1518). Married first Elizabeth Greystoke, daughter of Ralph de Greystoke, the 5th Baron Greystoke/7th Baron Boteler of Wem; and secondly, to Etheldreda, also called Audrey, Cotton, daughter of William Landwade Cotton of Landwade, Cambridgeshire.
- Christopher Talbot (c. 1454 – aft. 1474). Rector at Christchurch, Shropshire.
- Sir George Talbot (born c. 1456).
- Margaret Talbot (born c. 1460). Married Thomas Chaworth (died a lunatic 1482–1483), son of Sir William Chaworth and Elizabeth Bowett, without issue.

== Diplomat, Courtier and Statesman ==
Raised by his mother in the West Riding and estates around Sherwood Forest, his father was almost continually away in Ireland and France. Made Chancellor of Ireland by his father in March 1445, he remained until the new Viceroy, the duke of York appeared in Dublin in 1447.

Sent back there two years later, York accused the Lancastrian of trying to ambush the column at Holt, after he had lost most of his inheritance to Shrewsbury's new marriage. He moved into the majority court of Queen Margaret before Cade's Revolt. At Dartford, he was already indicting Yorkist traitors at law. He harboured some resentment against the young strutting duke, whose somewhat vain, and at times arrogant posturing annoyed him.

On the inheritance of the earldom, he had already felt confident to speak out against York's conduct as Lord Lieutenant of Ireland. And reaching this majority in the House of Lords, attracted the allegiance of his brother-in-law, James, earl of Ormond. During the Protectorate, but once York's party had left London, he sat in oyer et terminer on the traitor Henry Percy in June 1454. He was appointed Keeper of the Seas in the North.

Choosing the Northern affinity his friendship was for Ralph, Lord Cromwell, and less for his mother's clan, the Nevilles. They marched south to the First Battle of St Albans in 1455. After an indecisive encounter, Warwick sought Shrewsbury's side, and in so doing picked a fight with Cromwell. The latter died soon afterwards, and Shrewsbury threw his lot in with York and Warwick now a united party. He supported the preferment of George Neville to archbishop.

Realising the possible treachery of the 'professional army' of York he sided with Queen Margaret, by whom he was raised to Lord Treasurer of England on 14 September 1456. Talbot's tenure as Lord High Treasurer occurred during the Great Bullion Famine and the Great Slump in England. He attended on the royal party's progress through the Midlands in late 1456. During the month-long Great Council at the palace of Coventry, some MPs told him he should be fighting the French.

He continued a policy of taxation to pay for the King's Exchequer's debts, and fines in court pleadings. The following year he arranged the Loveday Award in which Earl of Devon was encouraged to act as mediator for his friend the duke of York. Margaret's attempt to break out peace in the realm failed, while at his greatest sharing power with Wiltshire, Shrewsbury was made a Knight of the Garter, Keeper of the Royal Mews, and Chief Butler.

He was replaced as Treasurer by the then more obviously Lancastrian Wiltshire after one year at the Great Council for Westminster in October 1458. Although he was appointed Chief Justice of Cheshire in 1459, there is no evidence that he visited the palatinate in this capacity. At the Coventry Parliament of 1459 he committed himself wholeheartedly to the king in support of the attainder of Yorkists, while Wiltshire fled abroad.

On 10 July 1460, during the Battle of Northampton he was found by York and retainers near the King's tent and hacked to death.

== See also ==
- List of lord high treasurers of England and Great Britain

Political offices
Preceded by The Earl of Shrewsbury	Lord High Steward of Ireland; 1453–1460	Succeeded by The Earl of Shrewsbury
Preceded by The Viscount Bourchier	Lord High Treasurer; 1456–1458	Succeeded by The Earl of Wiltshire
Peerage of England
Preceded by John Talbot	Earl of Shrewsbury; 1453–1460	Succeeded by John Talbot
Preceded by John Talbot	Baron Talbot; 1453–1460	Succeeded by John Talbot
Preceded by John Talbot	Baron Strange of Blackmere; 1453–1460	Succeeded by John Talbot
Preceded by John Talbot	Baron Furnivall; 1453–1460	Succeeded by John Talbot
Peerage of Ireland
Preceded by John Talbot	Earl of Waterford; 1453–1460	Succeeded by John Talbot
