= Baron Furnivall =

Title in the Peerage of England

Baron Furnivall is an ancient title in the Peerage of England. It was originally created (by writ) when Thomas de Furnivall was summoned to the Model Parliament on 24 June 1295 as Lord Furnivall. The barony eventually passed to Thomas Nevill, who had married the first baron's descendant Joan de Furnivall, and he was summoned to parliament in her right. Their daughter, Maud de Neville, married John Talbot, who was also summoned to parliament in her right. He was later created Earl of Shrewsbury. On the death of the seventh earl in 1616, the barony fell into abeyance. The abeyance was terminated naturally in favour of the earl's daughter Alethea Howard in 1651 and passed through her to the Dukes of Norfolk. On the death of the ninth Duke in 1777, the barony again fell into abeyance.

In 1913 the abeyance was terminated again in favour of Mary Frances Katherine Petre, daughter of Bernard Petre, 14th Baron Petre. Through her father she was a great-great-great-granddaughter of the ninth Baron Petre and his first wife Anne Howard, niece of the ninth Duke of Norfolk (and 18th Baron Furnivall), who became co-heir to the Barony on her uncle's death in 1777. On Lady Furnivall's death in 1968 the barony fell into abeyance for the third time. Hon Rosamond Mary Dent (Sister Ancilla Dent, OBE; 1933-2025). As a result the abeyance was automatically terminated, and her younger sister, Hon. Mrs. Patrica Mary Bence (born 1935) succeeded as Baroness Furnivall.

== Barons Furnivall (1295; 1318) ==
- Thomas de Furnivall, 1st Baron Furnivall (d. 1332)
- Thomas de Furnivall, 2nd Baron Furnivall (1301–1339), son; summoned from 1318 onward as Baron Furnivall (acceleration or new creation?). He married firstly Joan, daughter and co-heir of Theobald de Verdun, 2nd Baron Verdun.
- Thomas de Furnivall, 3rd Baron Furnivall (1322–1364), son
- William de Furnivall, 4th Baron Furnivall (1326–1383), brother
- Joane de Furnival, 5th Baroness Furnival (born in or before October 1368 - d. c. 1401), daughter
  - Thomas Nevill, 5th Baron Furnivall jure uxoris (d. 1407)
- Maud Nevill, 6th Baroness Furnivall, daughter
  - John Talbot, 1st Earl of Shrewsbury, 1st Earl of Waterford, 7th Baron Talbot, 10th Baron Strange of Blackmere, 6th Baron Furnivall jure uxoris (1390–1453) (created Earl of Shrewsbury in 1442)
- John Talbot, 2nd Earl of Shrewsbury, 2nd Earl of Waterford, 8th Baron Talbot, 11th Baron Strange of Blackmere, 7th Baron Furnivall (1413–1460)
- John Talbot, 3rd Earl of Shrewsbury, 3rd Earl of Waterford, 9th Baron Talbot, 12th Baron Strange of Blackmere, 8th Baron Furnivall (1448–1473)
- George Talbot, 4th Earl of Shrewsbury, 4th Earl of Waterford, 10th Baron Talbot, 13th Baron Strange of Blackmere, 9th Baron Furnivall (1468–1538)
- Francis Talbot, 5th Earl of Shrewsbury, 5th Earl of Waterford, 11th Baron Talbot, 14th Baron Strange of Blackmere, 10th Baron Furnivall (1500–1560)
- George Talbot, 6th Earl of Shrewsbury, 6th Earl of Waterford, 12th Baron Talbot, 15th Baron Strange of Blackmere, 11th Baron Furnivall (1522–1590)
- Gilbert Talbot, 7th Earl of Shrewsbury, 7th Earl of Waterford, 13th Baron Talbot, 16th Baron Strange of Blackmere, 12th Baron Furnivall (1552–1616) (abeyant 1616)
  - Co-heirs: Mary Herbert, Countess of Pembroke (died 1649 without issue); Elizabeth Grey, Countess of Kent (died 1651 without issue); and Alethea Howard, Countess of Arundel (died 1654 with issue)
- Alethea Howard, 14th Baroness Talbot, 17th Baroness Strange of Blackmere, 13th Baroness Furnivall née Talbot (d. 1654) (abeyance terminated as sole heir 1651)
- Thomas Howard, 5th Duke of Norfolk, 14th Baron Furnivall (1627–1677)
- Henry Howard, 6th Duke of Norfolk, 15th Baron Furnivall (1628–1684)
- Henry Howard, 7th Duke of Norfolk, 16th Baron Furnivall (1655–1701)
- Thomas Howard, 8th Duke of Norfolk, 17th Baron Furnivall (1683–1732)
- Edward Howard, 9th Duke of Norfolk, 18th Baron Furnivall (1685–1777)
- abeyant since 1777
  - List of co-heirs:

1777	Charles Philip Stourton, 17th Baron Stourton	Anne Howard, Baroness Petre
1787	Charles Philip Stourton, 17th Baron Stourton	Robert Petre, 10th Baron Petre
1809	Charles Philip Stourton, 17th Baron Stourton	William Petre, 11th Baron Petre
1816	William Stourton, 18th Baron Stourton	William Petre, 11th Baron Petre
1846	Charles Stourton, 19th Baron Stourton	William Petre, 11th Baron Petre
1850	Charles Stourton, 19th Baron Stourton	William Petre, 12th Baron Petre
1872	Alfred Stourton, 23rd Baron Mowbray, 20th Baron Stourton	William Petre, 12th Baron Petre
1884	Alfred Stourton, 23rd Baron Mowbray, 20th Baron Stourton	William Petre, 13th Baron Petre
1893	Charles Stourton, 24th Baron Mowbray, 21st Baron Stourton	Bernard Petre, 14th Baron Petre
1908	Charles Stourton, 24th Baron Mowbray, 21st Baron Stourton	The Hon. Mary Petre

- Mary Dent, 19th Baroness Furnivall (1900–1968) (abeyance terminated by Crown 1913; abeyant 1968)
  - List of co-heirs:

1968– 2025	The Hon. Rosamond Mary Dent (1933 - 2025); She died without issue and her sister succeeded as sole heir.	The Hon. Patricia Mary Bence (formerly Hornsby, nee Dent)

- Patricia Mary Bence, 20th Baroness Furnivall (b. 1935)

The heir apparent is the present holder’s son, the Hon. Walton Francis Petre Hornsby (b. 1958)

== See also ==
- Earl of Shrewsbury
- Duke of Norfolk
- Baron Petre
- Augustus Agar, first husband of the fourteenth baroness
