= Gilbert Talbot, 3rd Baron Talbot =

English nobleman and soldier (c. 1332–1387)

Gilbert Talbot
- 3rd Baron Talbot
- Arms of the Talbot family
- Born: ca. 1332
- Died: 24 April 1387; Roales, Spain
- Noble family: Talbot
- Spouses: Petronilla Butler; Joan Stafford
- Issue: Richard Talbot, 4th Baron Talbot; Elizabeth Talbot
- Father: Richard Talbot, 2nd Baron Talbot
- Mother: Elizabeth de Comyn

Gilbert Talbot, 3rd Baron Talbot (c. 1332–1387) was an English nobleman and soldier.

== Family ==
Talbot was the son and heir of Richard Talbot, 2nd Baron Talbot and his wife Elizabeth de Comyn. The Talbot family had been locally prominent in Herefordshire since the reign of Henry II of England, and had blood connections to both the Welsh and Scottish nobility. His father died in 1356, resulting in his succession as the third Baron Talbot.

== Military career ==
Talbot served in several English military campaigns. He fought in the Hundred Years War under the Black Prince, and was with the royal fleet under Admiral Michael de la Pole, 1st Earl of Suffolk. During the Peasants' Revolt, he was one of the commissioners tasked with raising forces to fight the rebels. He served under the Earl of Cambridge in Portugal and Spain in 1381–1382, and was present at the capture of Higuera la Real. During this Iberian service, he was chosen as the ambassador of the English forces to the king of Portugal to demand their wages. He returned to England, where he was called to Newcastle in 1385 for service against the Scots. He returned to Spain in 1386 with John of Gaunt when the latter was pressing his claim to the throne of Castile. He died of the plague while in Spain in 1387.

== Marriages and children ==
Talbot was married twice. Prior to 1361, he married Petronilla, daughter of James Butler, 1st Earl of Ormond by his wife Eleanor de Bohun. They had two children:

- Richard Talbot, 4th Baron Talbot, his son and heir. He is an ancestor to Lady Maud Parr, mother of Queen Catherine Parr who was the sixth and final wife of Henry VIII.
- Elizabeth Talbot, who married Henry Grey, 5th Baron Grey de Wilton

He married secondly Joan, daughter of Ralph de Stafford, 1st Earl of Stafford by his wife Margaret de Audley, 2nd Baroness Audley.

== Death and legacy ==
Talbot died on 24 April 1387 and was succeeded by his son Richard. He seems to have been a spendthrift, and left significant debts at his death. A year earlier, he had been pardoned for outlawry after failing to answer the Earl of Arundel concerning a debt of £3000. The economic problems he left behind were still affecting the Talbot family in the time of his grandson, the fifth baron.

Peerage of England
Preceded by Richard Talbot, 2nd Baron Talbot	Baron Talbot; 1356–1387	Succeeded by Richard Talbot, 4th Baron Talbot
