= Richard Talbot, 2nd Baron Talbot =

English nobleman

Richard Talbot
- 2nd Baron Talbot
- Arms of the Talbot family
- Born: ca. 1306
- Died: 23 October 1356
- Noble family: Talbot
- Spouse: Elizabeth de Comyn
- Issue: Gilbert Talbot, 3rd Baron Talbot
- Father: Gilbert Talbot, 1st Baron Talbot
- Mother: Anne Boteler

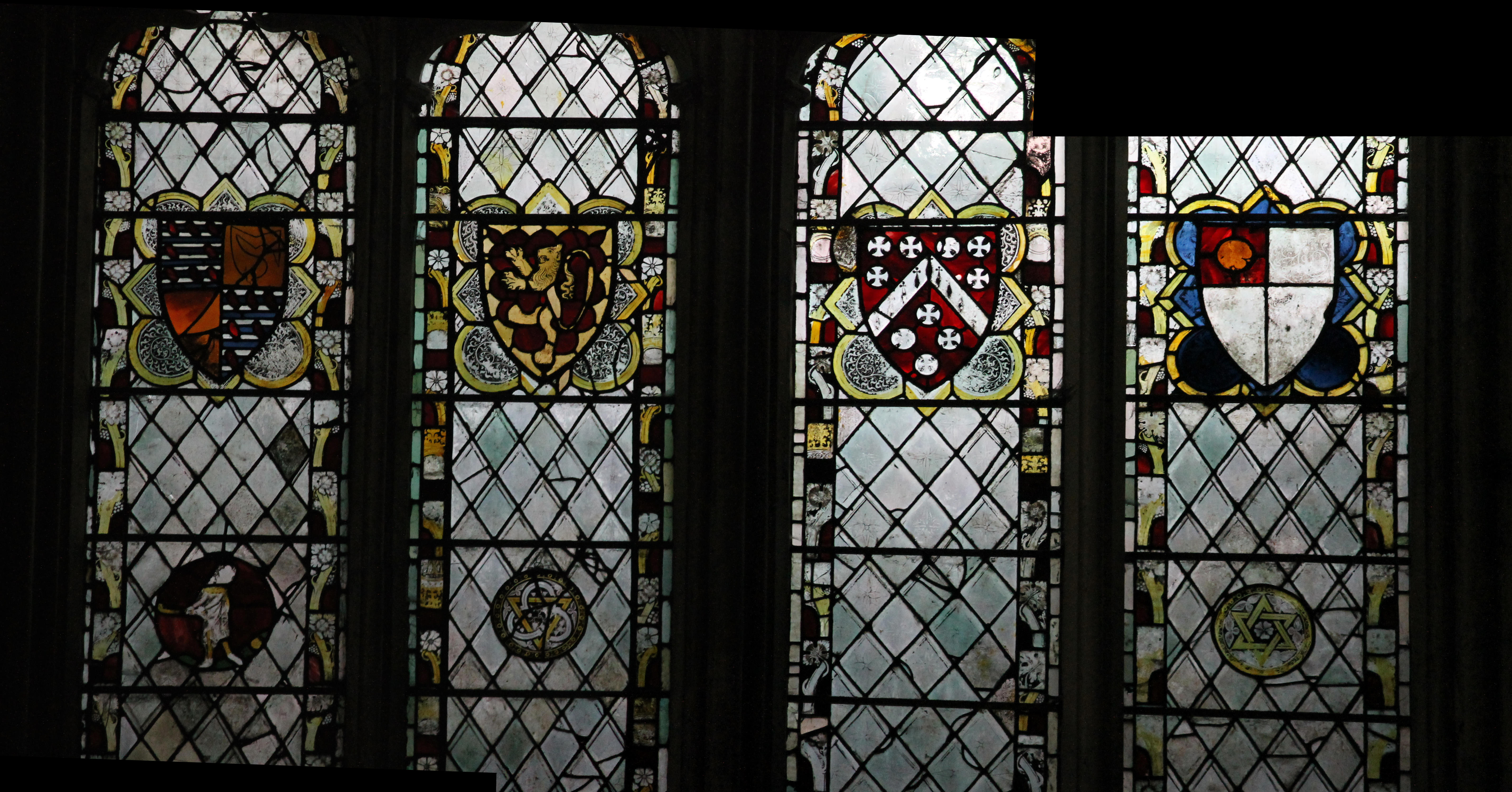
Arms of Richard Talbot, 2nd Baron Talbot, together with those of other knights who fought in the Battle of Crecy and at the Siege of Calais (1347), Great East Window of Gloucester Cathedral

Richard Talbot, 2nd Baron Talbot (c. 1306 – 23 October 1356) was an English nobleman and soldier. As the husband of the heiress Elizabeth de Comyn, he played a role in the Second War of Scottish Independence.

== Family ==
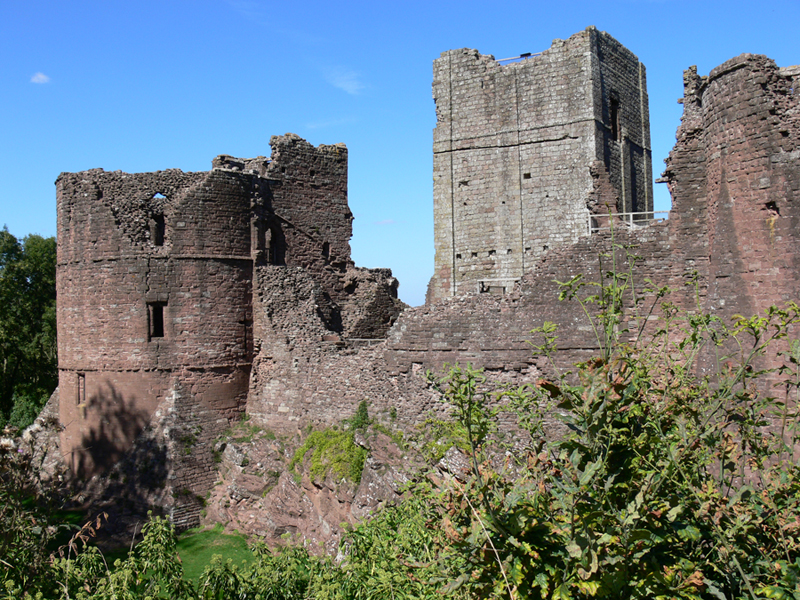
Ruins of Goodrich Castle, which Talbot held in the right of his wife

Talbot was the son and heir of Gilbert Talbot and Anne Boteler. His father had been raised to the peerage as the first Baron Talbot in 1331. The Talbots had been part of the Herefordshire gentry since the time of Henry II, and also had blood ties to the Welsh elite through a daughter of Rhys Mechyll, whose arms they had assumed. He inherited the title of Baron Talbot on his father's death in 1346. Talbot married Elizabeth Comyn, the daughter of John de Comyn and Joan de Valence. His wife was heir to large estates in both England and Scotland, including Goodrich Castle, though her father's estates in Scotland had been confiscated by Robert the Bruce, who had murdered her father.

== Conflict in England and Scotland ==
Like his father, Talbot was part of the anti-Despenser faction of the English nobility. Talbot joined Thomas, Earl of Lancaster, in rebellion against King Edward II, and was among the prisoners taken at the Battle of Boroughbridge. With the fall of Despenser, Talbot seized Goodrich Castle in his wife's name, the castle having been previously confiscated from Elizabeth Comyn by Despenser under threat of death. He was summoned to Parliament as "Richard Talbot of Goodrich Castle" from 1331 to 1355.

Talbot was counted among the "Disinherited" who flocked to the banner of Edward Balliol in his attempt to claim the throne of Scotland. When Balliol invaded Scotland in 1332, Talbot was among his supporters, and was among the combatants at the Battle of Dupplin Moor. Balliol put Talbot in possession of Kildrummy Castle and named him Earl of Mar in recognition of his support, around the beginning of 1334, and he was recorded as "Richard, lord of Mar" when he witnessed Balliol's charter granting the English extensive territorial concessions in Scotland. Talbot did not hold his new title for long; by 1335, he was simply recorded as "Sir Richard Talbot, Knight", with no mention of Mar. Talbot was captured by William Keith of Galston in 1334 while attempting to pass into England from the north, and ransomed the following year. He was appointed keeper of Berwick in December 1337, and justiciar of English lands in Scotland until April 1340.

== The Hundred Years War ==
Talbot subsequently fought for Edward III in the Hundred Years War. He served as a captain under William de Bohun, 1st Earl of Northampton at the Battle of Morlaix in 1342, was wounded in the lead-up to the Battle of Crécy in 1346, and fought at that battle as well as the Siege of Calais.

== Death and succession ==
Talbot died on 23 October 1356. He was succeeded in his estates and titles by his son, Gilbert Talbot, 3rd Baron Talbot.

Peerage of England
Preceded by Gilbert Talbot, 1st Baron Talbot	Baron Talbot; 1346–1356	Succeeded by Gilbert Talbot, 3rd Baron Talbot
