= Bertram Talbot, 17th Earl of Shrewsbury =

Bertram Arthur Talbot, 17th Earl of Shrewsbury, 17th Earl of Waterford (11 December 1832 – 10 August 1856) was a British nobleman.

Talbot was educated by private tutors. He succeeded his second cousin John as Earl of Shrewsbury and Waterford, and Lord High Steward of Ireland in 1852. He was appointed to the ceremonial post of Vice-Admiral of Cheshire on 9 March 1854 and as a deputy lieutenant of Staffordshire on 9 June 1854. Shrewsbury died two years later, on 10 August 1856, and his peerages passed to the next male-line relative, the 3rd Earl Talbot, in the only major leap of the title. They shared the same ancestor nine generations back: John Talbot (died 1549).

The Earl funded the building of Shrewsbury Cathedral in 1853-1856 but he died unmarried aged 23, three months prior its completion.

He was the last Catholic Earl of Shrewsbury.

Honorary titles
Preceded by John Talbot	Lord High Steward of Ireland; 1852–1856	Succeeded by Henry Chetwynd-Talbot
Vacant Title last held by The Earl of Stamford	Vice-Admiral of Cheshire; 1854–1856	Vacant
Peerage of England
Preceded by John Talbot	Earl of Shrewsbury; 1852–1856	Succeeded by Henry Chetwynd-Talbot
Peerage of Ireland
Preceded by John Talbot	Earl of Waterford; 1852–1856	Succeeded by Henry Chetwynd-Talbot
