= Gilbert Talbot, 1st Baron Talbot =

English nobleman (1276/77–1346)

Gilbert Talbot
- 1st Baron Talbot
- Arms of the Talbot family
- Born: ca. 1276/7
- Died: 1346
- Noble family: Talbot
- Spouse: Anne Boteler
- Issue: Richard Talbot, 2nd Baron Talbot
- Father: Richard Talbot
- Mother: Sarah Beauchamp

Gilbert Talbot, 1st Baron Talbot (1276/77–1346) was an English nobleman. He was the first of his line to hold the title of Baron Talbot, and the lineal ancestor of the Earls of Shrewsbury.

== Family ==
Talbot was the son of Richard Talbot, the feudal baron of Eccleswall and Sheriff of Gloucestershire, and his wife Sarah Beauchamp, daughter of William de Beauchamp. The Talbots were among the Herefordshire gentry, having obtained grants of land there from King Henry II. They also had blood ties with the Welsh elite, through Richard Talbot's mother Gwenllian, a daughter of the Welsh prince Rhys Mechyll, whose arms the Talbots assumed in place of their ancestral coat. The assumption about Gwenllian however was unfounded as Rhys Mechyll also had male heirs who acceded to the arms of the House of Dinefwr. Gilbert Talbot succeeded to his father's estates in 1306, when he was said to be aged about twenty-nine. Talbot married Anne Boteler, daughter of William Boteler.

== Gaveston and Despenser ==
During the tumultuous reign of Edward II, Talbot was aligned with the enemies of two of the king's favorites, Piers de Gaveston and Hugh Despenser. He was implicated for involvement in Gaveston's murder, but was pardoned. Despite his role in the death of the king's favorite, he was appointed to govern Gloucester Castle in 1317. Talbot joined Thomas of Lancaster in the baronial revolt against Despenser, and was heavily fined when the revolt failed. He was also ordered to surrender the governorship of Gloucester to Despenser.

== Career under Edward III ==
Fortunately for Talbot, the penalty against him for his role in the Despenser War was never levied. When Edward III took the throne, the fines against him were reversed. In 1328, he was appointed Lord Chamberlain. In 1330, he was appointed Justice of South Wales. He was first summoned to Parliament on 5 June 1331, and continued to be summoned through 20 April 1343. This established him as a baron by writ, the first Baron Talbot.

== Death and succession ==
Talbot died in 1346. He was succeeded in his titles and estates by his son, Richard Talbot, 2nd Baron Talbot.

Peerage of England
Preceded by New Creation	Baron Talbot; 1331–1346	Succeeded by Richard Talbot, 2nd Baron Talbot
