= Rhys Mechyll =

Welsh prince

Arms of House of Deheubarth: Gules, a lion rampant or within a bordure engrailled or. These arms were inherited by the Talbot family, later Earls of Shrewsbury

Rhys Mechyll (died 1244) was a Welsh prince, Lord of Dinefwr, of the House of Dinefwr and Kingdom of Deheubarth in southern Wales from 1234 to 1244. He was a son of prince Rhys Gryg (died 1234) ("Rhys the Hoarse"), son of prince Rhys ap Gruffydd (1132–1197), "The Lord Rhys", ruler of the kingdom of Deheubarth.

== Marriage ==
He married Matilda de Braose (died 1248) who betrayed the dynasty's chief castle of Carreg Cennen to the Anglo-Normans in 1248, against the interests of her son Rhys. A Welsh chronicle, the Brut y Tywysogyon, records under the year 1248: "Rhys Fychan ap Rhys Mechyll regained the castle of Carreg Cennen, which his mother had treacherously placed in the power of the French, out of enmity for her son."

== Progeny ==
He had four sons and a daughter, Gwenllian, who married Gilbert Talbot (died 1274), the grandfather of Gilbert Talbot, 1st Baron Talbot (died 1345/46), who claimed the ancient armorials of the House of Deheubarth, assumed as arms of alliance to a great princess in place of his own paternal arms. The assumption about Gwenllian, however, was unfounded as Rhys Mechyll, Lord of Dinefwr, also had male heirs who acceded to the arms of the House of Deheubarth.

== Notes ==
- Walker, David. Medieval Wales, Cambridge University Press, 1990, p. 98. ISBN 978-0-521-31153-3
