= Gilbert Talbot, 5th Baron Talbot =

English Knight of the Garter

Gilbert Talbot Baron Talbot
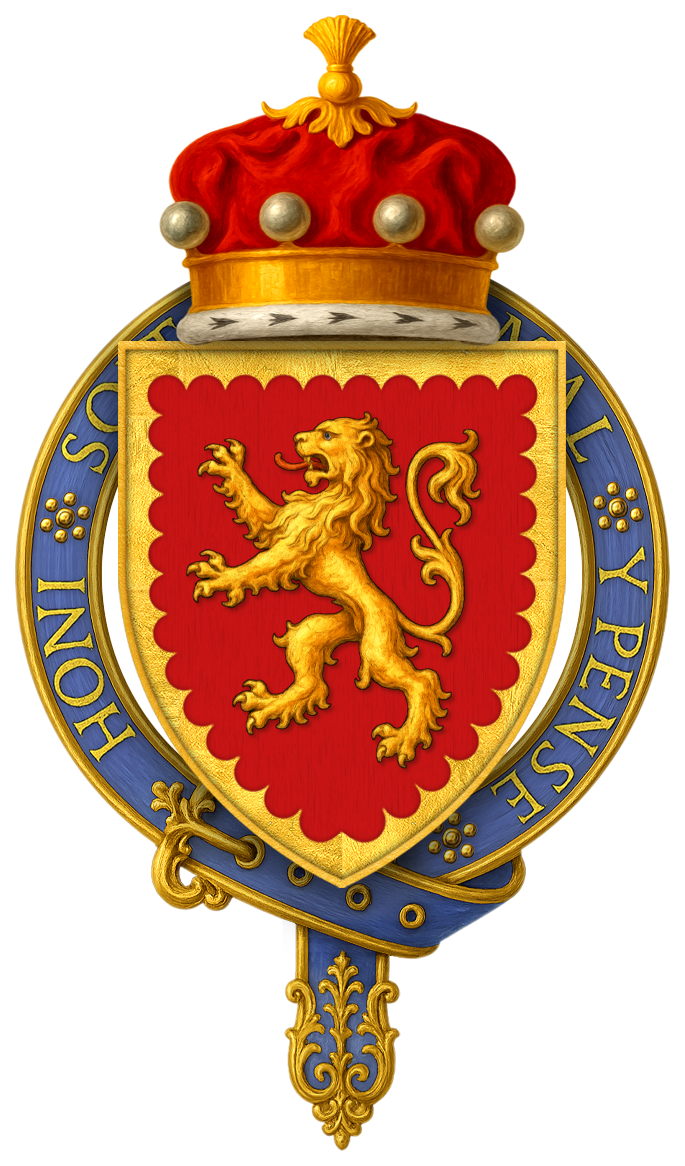
- Arms of Sir Gilbert Talbot
- Born: 1383
- Died: 19 October 1418 (aged 34–35); Siege of Rouen
- Parent(s): Richard Talbot, 4th Baron Talbot; Ankaretta, 7th Baroness Strange
- Relatives: John Talbot, 1st Earl of Shrewsbury

Gilbert Talbot, 5th Baron Talbot, 8th Baron Strange of Blackmere, KG (1383 – 19 October 1418) of Blakemere, Whitchurch, Shropshire, was an English Knight of the Garter.

He was born the eldest son of Richard Talbot, 4th Baron Talbot, and Ankaretta, 7th Baroness Strange. He succeeded his father as Baron Talbot in 1396 when still a minor and was therefore made a ward of the King until 1403.

Form 1403 he was in the service of Henry of Monmouth, Prince of Wales, guarding the Welsh Border. With his company of esquires and archers, Talbot defeated a superior Welsh force at Grosmont, Monmouthshire, in 1404. He was summoned to the House of Lords from 1407 and invested as a Knight of the Garter in 1408/09. After a trip to Ireland under Thomas of Lancaster in 1408 he joined forces with his brother John to recapture Harlech Castle from Owain Glyndŵr later in the year.

He succeeded to his mother's title in 1413, becoming 8th Baron Strange of Blakemere and was appointed Chief Justice of Chester in 1413. He served on a number of commissions and, whilst waiting at Southampton in 1415 to follow Henry V on his French campaign, took part in the trials of the traitors Richard, Earl of Cambridge, and Lord Scrope for their part in the Southampton Plot.

Once in France he took part in the siege of Caen (1417) and was made Captain-general of the Normandy Marches. In the winter of 1418 he led a successful operation into Cotentin but was mauled on his return by the Captain of Cherbourg. He was appointed Captain of Caen Castle in 1418 and in the same year involved in the successful sieges of Domfront and Caudebec.

He died in 1418 at the Siege of Rouen.

== Private life ==
In 1392, he was betrothed or married to Joan of Woodstock, the 8 year old daughter of Thomas of Woodstock, Duke of Gloucester. However, she died in 1400 during childbirth. He then married in 1415 Beatrice, a Portuguese woman. He was succeeded in turn by his daughter Ankaret Talbot, 6th Baroness Talbot, who died as a young child in 1421, and his brother John Talbot, 7th Baron Talbot, later 1st Earl of Shrewsbury.

Peerage of England
Preceded by Richard Talbot	Baron Talbot; 1396–1418	Succeeded by Ankaret Talbot followed by John Talbot
Preceded by Ankaret Strange	Baron Strange of Blackmere; 1413–1418	Succeeded by Ankaret Talbot followed by John Talbot
