= Church of St Giles, Goodrich =

Coordinates: 51.8684°N 2.7169°W

Church of St Giles
- St Giles Church, Goodrich with Welsh Bicknor
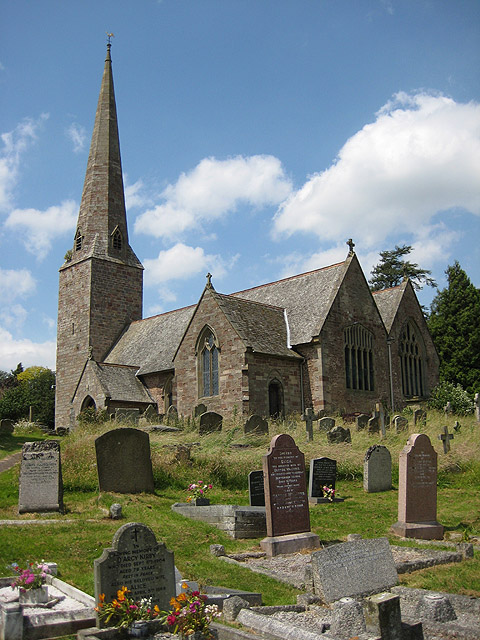

- Location in Herefordshire
- Location: Goodrich, Herefordshire
- Country: England
- Denomination: Church of England
- Website: St Giles Church, Goodrich with Welsh Bicknor

History
- Status: Parish church
- Founded: 13th century

Architecture
- Functional status: Active
- Heritage designation: Grade II* listed
- Architect(s): John Pollard Seddon, 19th century restoration
- Style: Decorated Gothic

Administration
- Province: Province of Canterbury
- Archdiocese: Diocese of Hereford

St Giles' Church, Goodrich, Herefordshire, England is an Anglican parish church in the Diocese of Hereford. The church dates from the 13th century, although almost all of the current building is of the 14th century, or from the 19th century restoration. It is an active parish church and a Grade II* listed building.

== History ==
The church's origins are of the 13th century. The church was developed, along with the village of Goodrich, in parallel with the expansion of Goodrich Castle by Godric of Mappestone and subsequently the powerful de Clare family. The tower dates from the 14th century. During the English Civil War the vicar was Thomas Swift, grandfather of Jonathon Swift, whose strongly Royalist sympathies led the family to relocate to Ireland. The building was heavily restored by John Pollard Seddon from 1870. St Giles remains an active parish church in the benefice of Goodrich and Welsh Bicknor.

== Architecture and description ==
The church is constructed of red sandstone rubble. The tower dates from the 14th century, and the church has a double-aisle. The interior contains much linenfold panelling, some reputed to come from a nearby country house, Hill Court. Alan Brooks, in his 2012 revised Herefordshire volume of the Pevsner Buildings of England, suggests another source as Goodrich Court, the demolished house of Samuel Rush Meyrick, whose tomb, with that of his son, stands in the churchyard. Much restoration was carried out in the later 19th century by Seddon, a prolific church restorer, often in partnership with John Prichard. The steeple is topped by a weathervane in the form of a cockerel. Designed by a metal worker, John Rudge, of Ross-on-Wye, it dates from the 18th century. (Note: Another example of a cockerel weathervane by Rudge crowns the spire of St Mary's Priory Church, just over the Welsh border in Monmouth.)

=== Listing designations ===
St Giles is a Grade II* listed building. The church and its churchyard contain 27 listed memorials, all at Grade II. Within the church these include: the Eyles Monument, and two chest tombs. Those within the churchyard include: the base and shaft of the churchyard cross, now converted to a sundial; three groups of headstones; the Tovey Monument; the Williams Monument; headstones commemorating Elizabeth Roberts and Anne Weaver; the Fisher Monument; a memorial to Isabella Wolfe; the Meyrick Memorial; three chest tombs; the Gritton Monument; a headstone with an undecipherable inscription; the Harper Monument; the Jenings Headstone; the Edwards Monument; a stone bench; two memorials to the Fletcher Family; a monument to William Fisher; the Gwilliam Monument; the Miles Monument; and a pedestal tomb.

== Sources ==
- Brooks, Alan; Pevsner, Nikolaus (2012). Herefordshire. The Buildings of England. Yale University Press. ISBN 978-0-300-12575-7. OCLC 759174126.
