= Rudhall Manor =

Manor house in Herefordshire, England

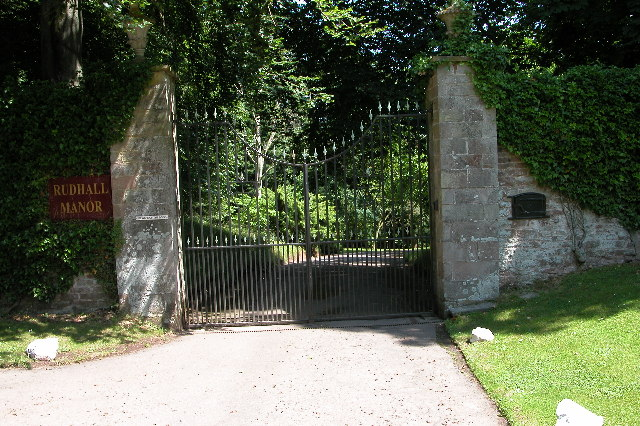
- The gates to Rudhall Manor - the house is not visible from the road

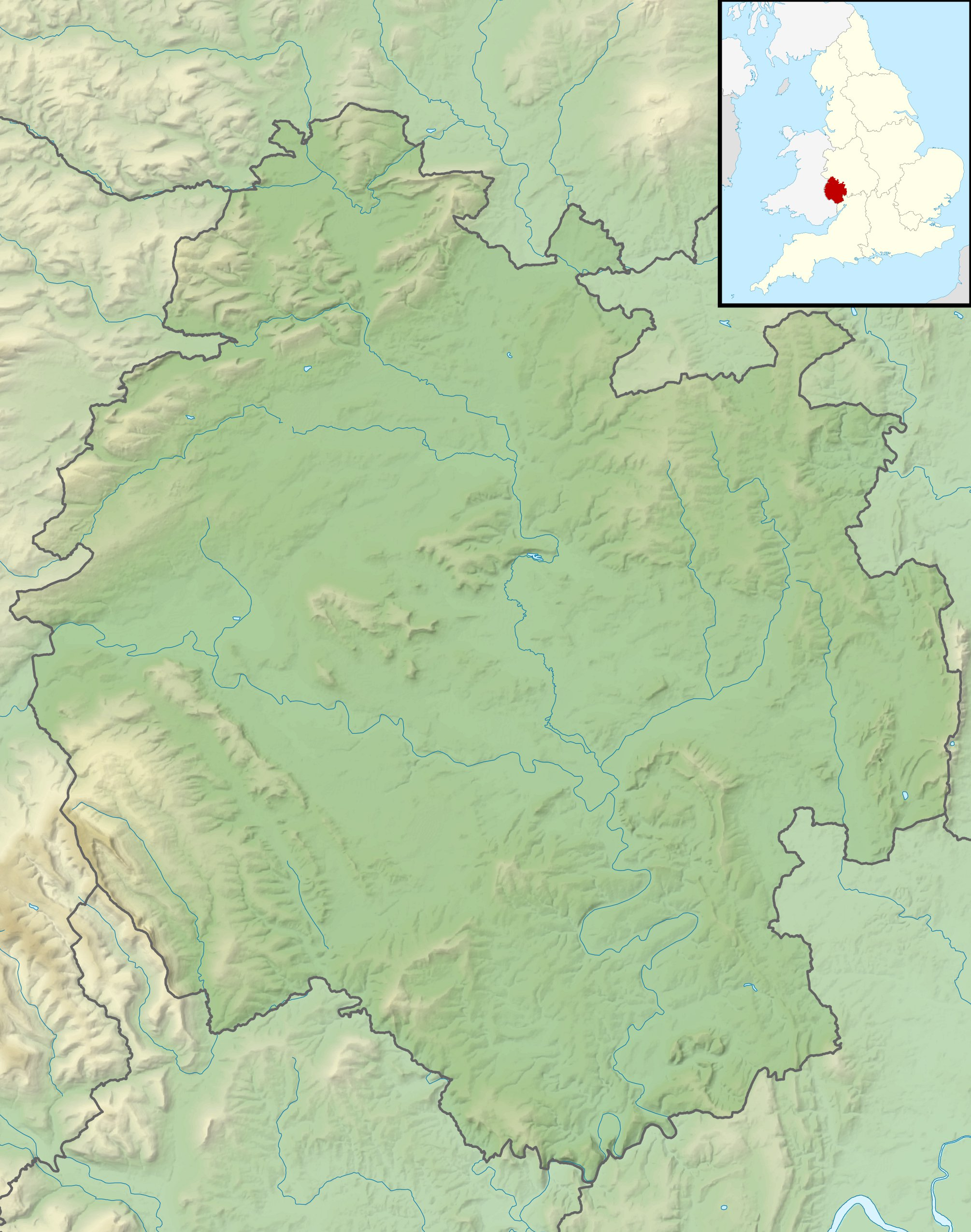
- Location within Herefordshire
- 51.9257°N 2.5461°W
- Type: House
- Location: Rudhall, Herefordshire, England

History
- Built: 14th century with later additions

Site notes
- Governing body: Privately owned

Listed Building – Grade I
- Official name: Rudhall House
- Designated: 25 February 1966
- Reference no.: 1099260

Listed Building – Grade II
- Official name: Cross base approximately 75m south-west of Rudhall House
- Designated: 17 March 1987
- Reference no.: 1296850

Rudhall Manor is a manor house in Rudhall, Herefordshire, England. It dates from the late 14th century and is a Grade I listed building.

== History ==
The hamlet of Rudhall sits at the junction of three parishes, Brampton Abbotts, Ross-on-Wye and Weston under Penyard, about 2 miles to the east of Ross. Rudhall Manor dates from the 14th century, although the house underwent extensive remodelling in each subsequent century and was restored in the 20th. In the Tudor era the manor came into the possession of Herbert Westfaling II, son of the Bishop of Hereford, who married the Rudhall heiress. (Note: The antiquarian Samuel Meyrick purchased a number of items from the house in the 1830 sale, for display at his nearby home, Goodrich Court. These included the menu for a New Year's Eve feast hosted by Westfaling in 1598, at which he offered veal, mutton, beef, pigeon and goose, followed by mince pies.) In the early 19th century, the house was reputedly used as a point of assignation by Lord Nelson and his lover, Emma Hamilton, during their tours of the Wye Valley. In 1830 the manor was bought by Alexander Baring, 1st Baron Ashburton of Barings Bank. Later owners included the ornithologist Peter Scott and the businessman John Harvey-Jones. As at May 2024, the manor is for sale.

== Architecture and description ==
Pevsner and Brooks describe the complex building history of the manor, which was begun in the 14th century, and developed by William Rudhall in the 16th. Later Georgian and Victorian developments saw the house extended with wings to the south and east. The interior has much wood panelling, some original and some introduced to the house, and decorative wood and stone carving. Above the entrance porch, the Rudhall badge, a Catherine Wheel, is displayed. (Note: Catherine of Alexandria, who was martyred on a breaking wheel, had been venerated in nearby Ledbury since the Early Middle Ages.) Rudhall Manor is a Grade I listed building.

The grounds include a stream, lakes, and the base of a medieval church cross.

== Sources ==
- Brooks, Alan; Pevsner, Nikolaus (2012). Herefordshire. The Buildings of England. New Haven, US and London: Yale University Press. ISBN 978-0-300-12575-7.
- Meyrick, Samuel (1834). "Rudhall, Herefordshire". The Analyst: A Quarterly Journal of Science, Literature, Natural History, and the Fine Arts. 1.
- Woolhope Naturalists Field Club (1921). Transactions of the Woolhope Naturalists' Field Club. Hereford: Jakeman & Carver. OCLC 898706430.
