= Goodrich Castle =

11th-century castle near Goodrich in Herefordshire, England

- Herefordshire, England
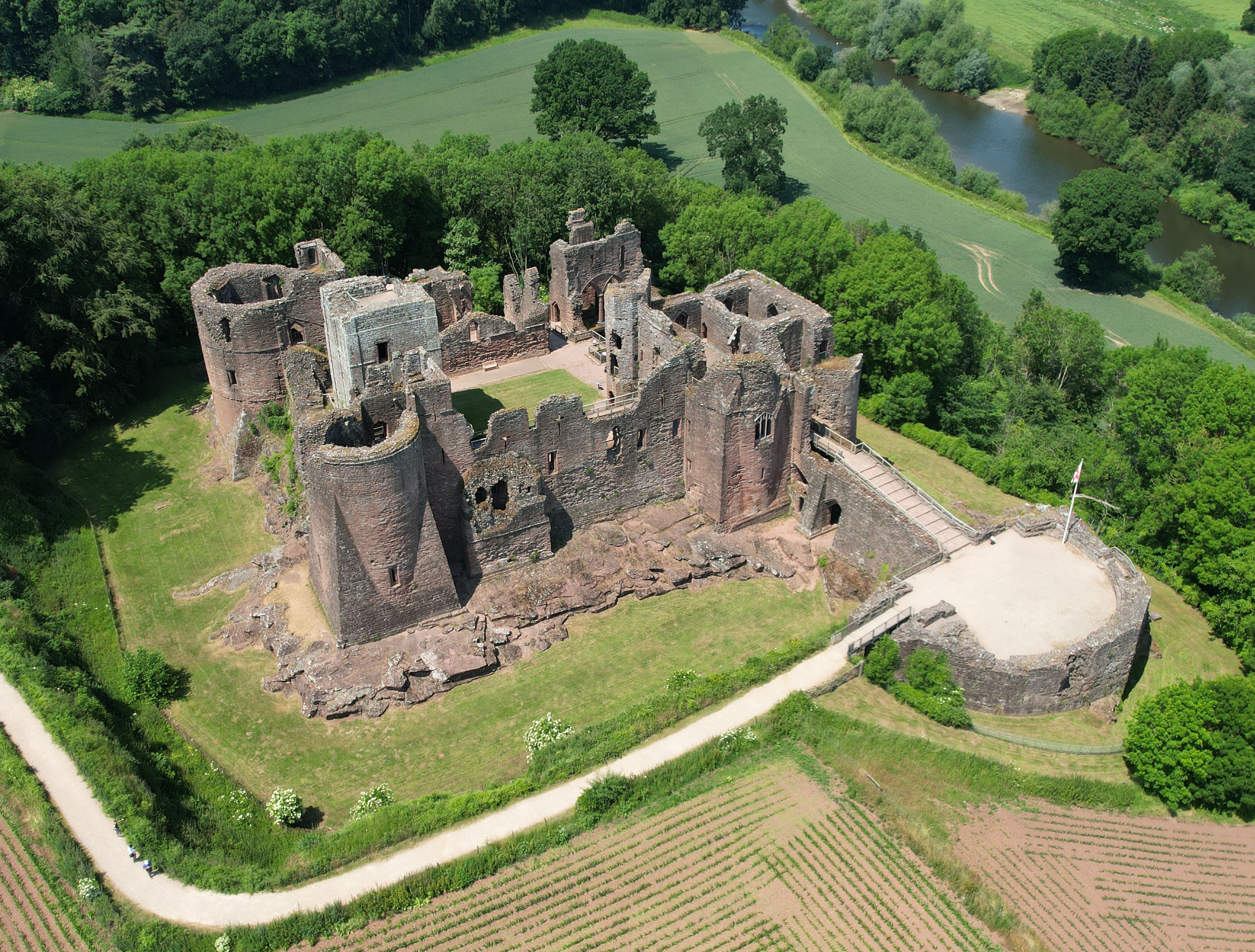
- Goodrich Castle, seen from the east

Site information
- Type: Concentric castle
- Owner: English Heritage
- Controlled by: English Heritage
- Open to the public: Yes
- Condition: Ruined

Location
- Shown within Herefordshire
- Coordinates: 51.8761°N 2.6130°W
- Grid reference: grid reference SO579199

Site history
- Materials: Sandstone

Goodrich Castle is a ruined medieval castle north of the village of Goodrich in Herefordshire, England, controlling a key location between Monmouth and Ross-on-Wye. It was praised by William Wordsworth as the "noblest ruin in Herefordshire" and is considered by historian Adrian Pettifer to be the "most splendid in the county, and one of the best examples of English military architecture".

Goodrich Castle was probably begun by Godric of Mappestone after the Norman Conquest of England, initially as an earth and wooden fortification. In the middle of the 12th century the original castle was replaced with a stone keep, and was then expanded significantly during the late 13th century into a concentric structure combining luxurious living quarters with extensive defences. The success of Goodrich's design influenced many other constructions across England over the following years. It became the seat of the powerful Talbot family before falling out of favour as a residence in late Tudor times.

Held first by Parliamentary and then Royalist forces in the English Civil War of the 1640s, Goodrich was finally successfully besieged by Colonel John Birch in 1646 with the help of the huge "Roaring Meg" mortar, resulting in the subsequent slighting of the castle and its descent into ruin. At the end of the 18th century, however, Goodrich became a noted picturesque ruin and the subject of many paintings and poems; events at the castle provided the inspiration for Wordsworth's famous 1798 poem "We are Seven". By the 20th century the site was a well-known tourist location, now owned by English Heritage and open to the public.

== Architecture ==
The south-eastern tower shows the characteristic right-angled "spur", designed to prevent its undermining during a siege.

Goodrich Castle stands on a high rocky sandstone outcrop overlooking the River Wye. It commands a crossing of the river, known as Walesford or Walford, Ross-on-Wye, about 26 kilometres (16 mi) from Hereford and 6.4 kilometres (4.0 mi) from Ross-on-Wye. The castle guards the line of the former Roman road from Gloucester to Caerleon as it crosses from England into Wales.

At the heart of the castle is an early Norman square keep of light grey sandstone, with Norman windows and pilaster buttresses. Although the keep had thick walls, its relatively small size – the single chambers on each floor measure only 5.5 by 4.5 metres (18 by 15 ft) internally – would have made it more useful for defence than for day-to-day living. The keep originally had a first-storey door for safety, this was later turned into a window and the entrance brought down to the ground floor. The keep would originally have had an earth mound built up against the base of it to protect against attack, and the stone work remains rougher in the first few courses of masonry.

Around the keep is an essentially square structure guarded by three large towers, all built during the 1280s from somewhat darker sandstone. On the more vulnerable southern and eastern sides of the castle, ditches 27 metres (90 ft) long and 9 metres (28 ft) deep have been cut into the rock, exploiting a natural fissure. These towers have large "spurs", resulting from the interface of a solid, square-based pyramid with the circular towers rising up against the walls. This feature is characteristic of castles in the Welsh Marches, including St Briavel's and Tonbridge Castle, and was intended to prevent the undermining of the towers by attackers.

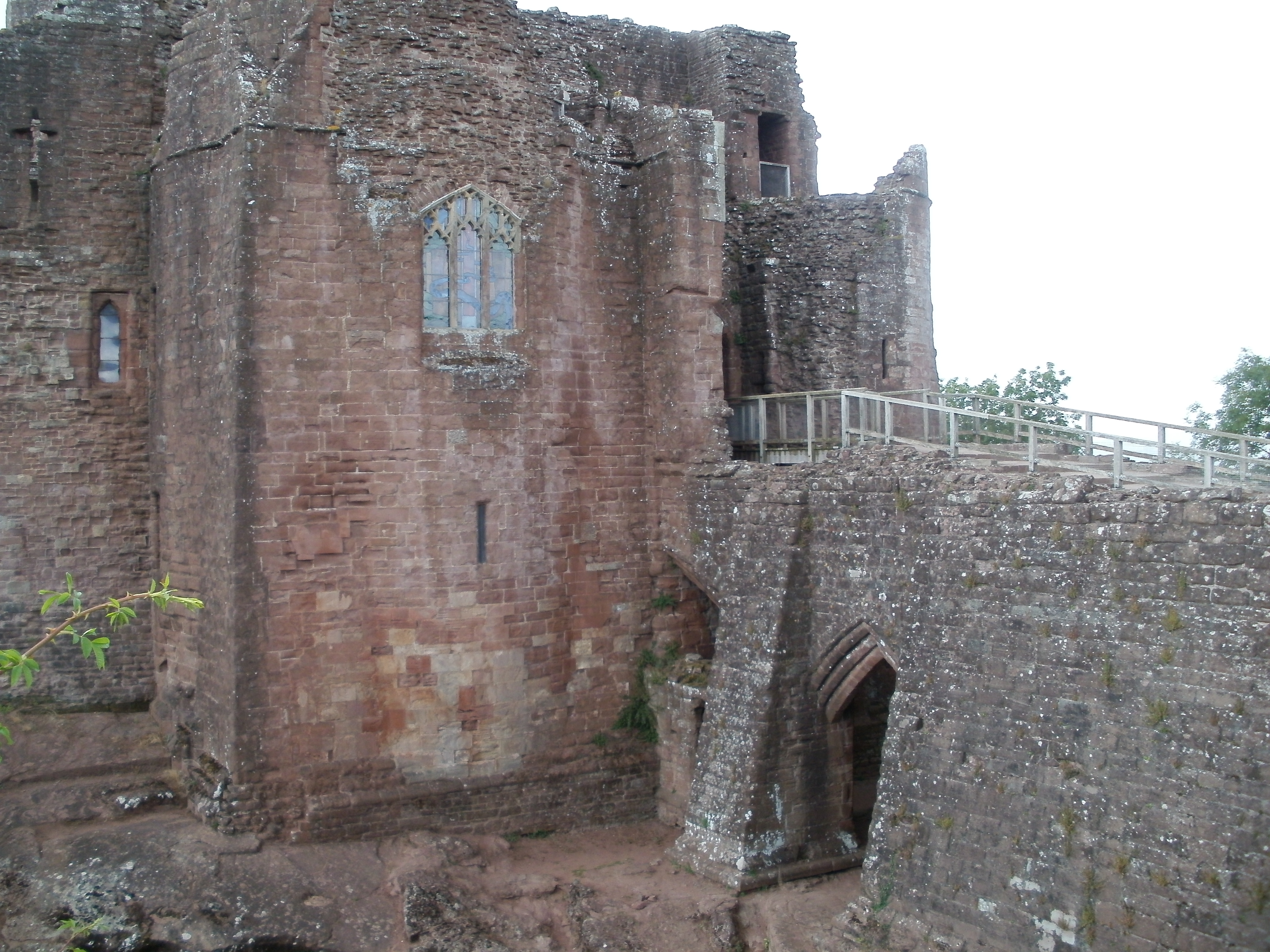
The gatehouse is reached by an exposed causeway covered by the barbican to the right of the picture. The chapel window can be seen in the left-hand tower.

The castle's fourth corner forms its gatehouse. Here the classic Edwardian gatehouse design has been transformed into an asymmetrical structure, with one tower much larger than the other. The gatehouse included portcullises, murder-holes and a drawbridge. Beyond the gatehouse lies a large barbican, inspired by a similar design of the period at the Tower of London and possibly built by the same workmen, designed to protect the causeway leading to the gatehouse. The barbican today is only half of its original height, and includes its own gate, designed to trap intruders within the inner defences. The gatehouse and barbican are linked by a stone causeway.

The gatehouse's eastwards-facing tower contains the chapel, an unusual arrangement driven by a lack of space, with a recently restored east window of reset 15th-century glass designed by Nicola Hopwood, which illuminates the priest's seat, or sedile. The 15th-century window frame itself replaced an even taller, earlier 13th-century window. The chapel's west window is modern, and commemorates the British scientists, engineers and servicemen involved in radar development who died between 1936 and 1976. (Note: The link between the castle and radar development is due to flight VS9977, which crashed near Goodrich Castle in 1942 whilst testing the advanced H2S radar system, killing the famous British scientist Alan Blumlein and several others.) The altar itself is particularly old, possibly pre-dating the castle.

The bailey was designed to include a number of spacious domestic buildings. These include a great hall, a solarium, kitchen, buttery and pantry, with a luxuriously large number of garderobes and fireplaces. The large towers provided additional accommodation. The design of the domestic buildings was skilfully interlocked to support the defensive arrangements of the bailey. The great hall for example, 20 by 9 metres (66 by 30 ft), was placed in the strongest position overlooking the river Wye, allowing it to benefit from multiple large windows and a huge fireplace without sacrificing defensive strength. Water for the castle was originally raised from the courtyard well, but was later piped in from a spring across the valley; the castle kitchens had acquired running water by the beginning of the 17th century. The design of the buildings ensured that the servants and nobility were able to live separately from one another in the confined space of the castle, revolutionary at the time.

Beyond the main bailey walls lies the stable block, now ruined but with a visible cobble floor. The stables and the north and west sides of the castle were protected by another, smaller curtain wall, but this is now largely ruined. Accounts suggest that the original stables could hold around 60 horses, although by the 17th century they had been expanded to accommodate more.

== History ==
=== Medieval History ===
==== 11th and 12th Centuries ====
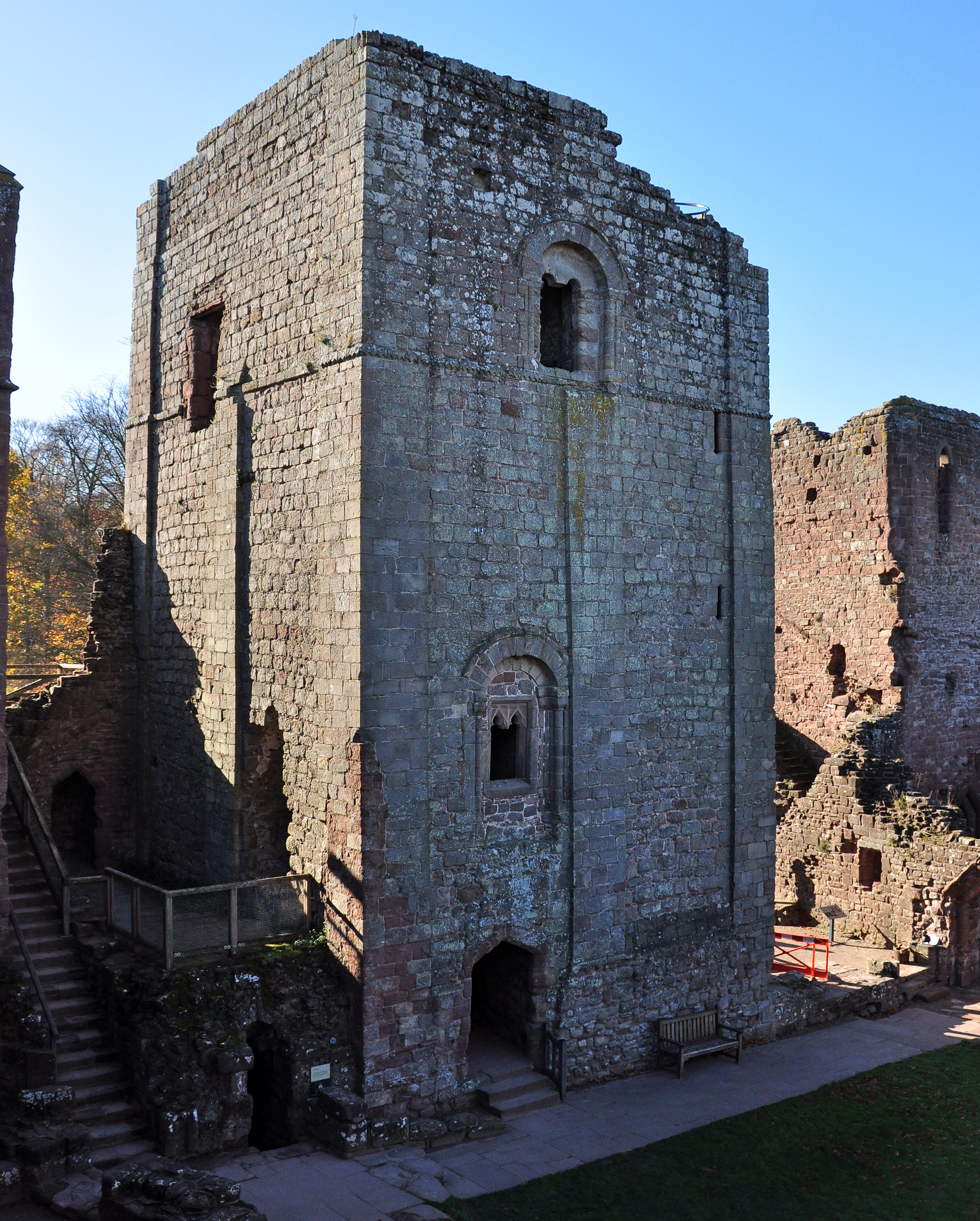
The Great Keep replaced Godric of Mappestone's original earth and timber fortification on the site in the mid-12th century.

Goodrich Castle appears to have been in existence by 1101, when it was known as Godric's Castle, named probably after Godric of Mappestone, a local Anglo-Saxon thane and landowner mentioned in the Domesday Book of 1086. Victorian historians, however, believed the castle to date back further to the pre-Norman conquest days of King Canute, and the site may have been among a small number of Saxon fortifications along the Welsh border. By Norman times, Goodrich formed part of the Welsh Marches, a sequence of territories granted to Norman nobles in, and alongside, Wales. Although Goodrich lay on the safer, English side of the border, the threat of raids and attacks continued throughout most of the period.

During the 12th century the attitudes of the English nobility towards the Welsh began to harden; the policies of successive rulers, but especially Henry II, began to become more aggressive in the region. In the mid-12th century Godric's original earth and timber fortification was dismantled and replaced by a tall but relatively small square keep built of stone, sometimes known as "Macbeth's Tower". The keep was designed to be secure and imposing but relatively cheap to build. It is uncertain, however, precisely who was responsible for this rebuilding or the date of the work, which may have been between 1120 and 1176.

At the beginning of the 12th century, the castle had passed from Godric to William Fitz Baderon, thought to be his son-in-law, and on to his son, Baderon of Monmouth, in the 1120s. England descended into anarchy, however, during the 1130s as the rival factions of Stephen and his cousin the Empress Matilda vied for power. Baderon of Monmouth married Rohese de Clare, a member of the powerful de Clare family who usually supported Stephen, and there are records of Baderon having to seize Goodrich Castle during the fighting in the region, which was primarily held by supporters of Matilda. Some suspect that Baderon may have therefore built the stone keep in the early years of the conflict. (Note: Radford notes Fitz Baderon making grants of lands associated with the castle in 1144, p. 3.) Stephen went on, however, to appoint Baderon's brother-in-law, Gilbert de Claire, the Earl of Pembroke, and Gilbert de Clare eventually acquired Goodrich Castle himself. Gilbert's son, Richard de Clare, known as "Strongbow", succeeded him in 1148, and Richard is another candidate for the construction of the keep. In 1154 Richard fell out of favour with King Henry II because of the de Clares' support for Stephen, and the castle was taken into royal hands. Some argue that the king himself may have ordered the construction of the great keep.

==== 13th and 14th Centuries ====
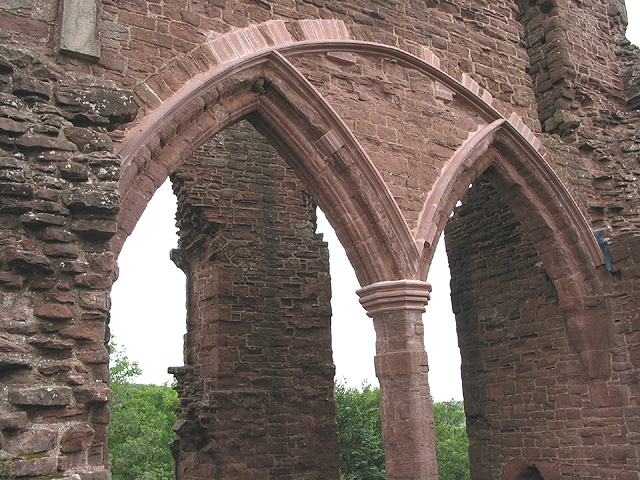
The private solarium was incorporated into the defensive walls during the expansion under William de Valence.

During the following reigns of King Richard I and his brother John, the castle and manor were held by the Crown. King John, however, lost many of his lands in France which in turn deprived key English nobles of their own estates – John became concerned about possible opposition to his rule. Accordingly, in 1203 John transferred Goodrich Castle and the surrounding manor to William Marshal, Earl of Pembroke, to partially compensate him for his lost lands on the continent. Marshal was a famous English knight with reputation as a heroic warrior, and he expanded Goodrich by building an additional towered curtain wall in stone, around the existing keep. Marshal had to intervene to protect Goodrich Castle from Welsh attack, most famously in 1216 when he was obliged to leave Henry III's coronation feast in Gloucester to hurry back to Goodrich to reinforce the castle.

Marshal's sons inherited the castle after their father's death; Marshal left the castle to his eldest son, William, who in turn gave it to his younger brother, Walter. After William's death, however, Marshal's second son, Richard, took over the castle. Richard led the baronial opposition to Henry III and allied himself with the Welsh, resulting in King Henry besieging Goodrich Castle in 1233 and retaking personal control for a period. Walter was eventually given Goodrich back once more, but died shortly afterwards in 1245.

The castle briefly reverted to the Crown again, but in 1247 passed by marriage to William de Valence, half brother to Henry III. De Valence was a French nobleman from Poitiers and a noted soldier who spent most of his life fighting in military campaigns; Henry arranged his marriage to Joan de Munchensi, one of the heiresses to the Marshal estate. The marriage made Valence immensely rich and gave him the title of Earl of Pembroke.

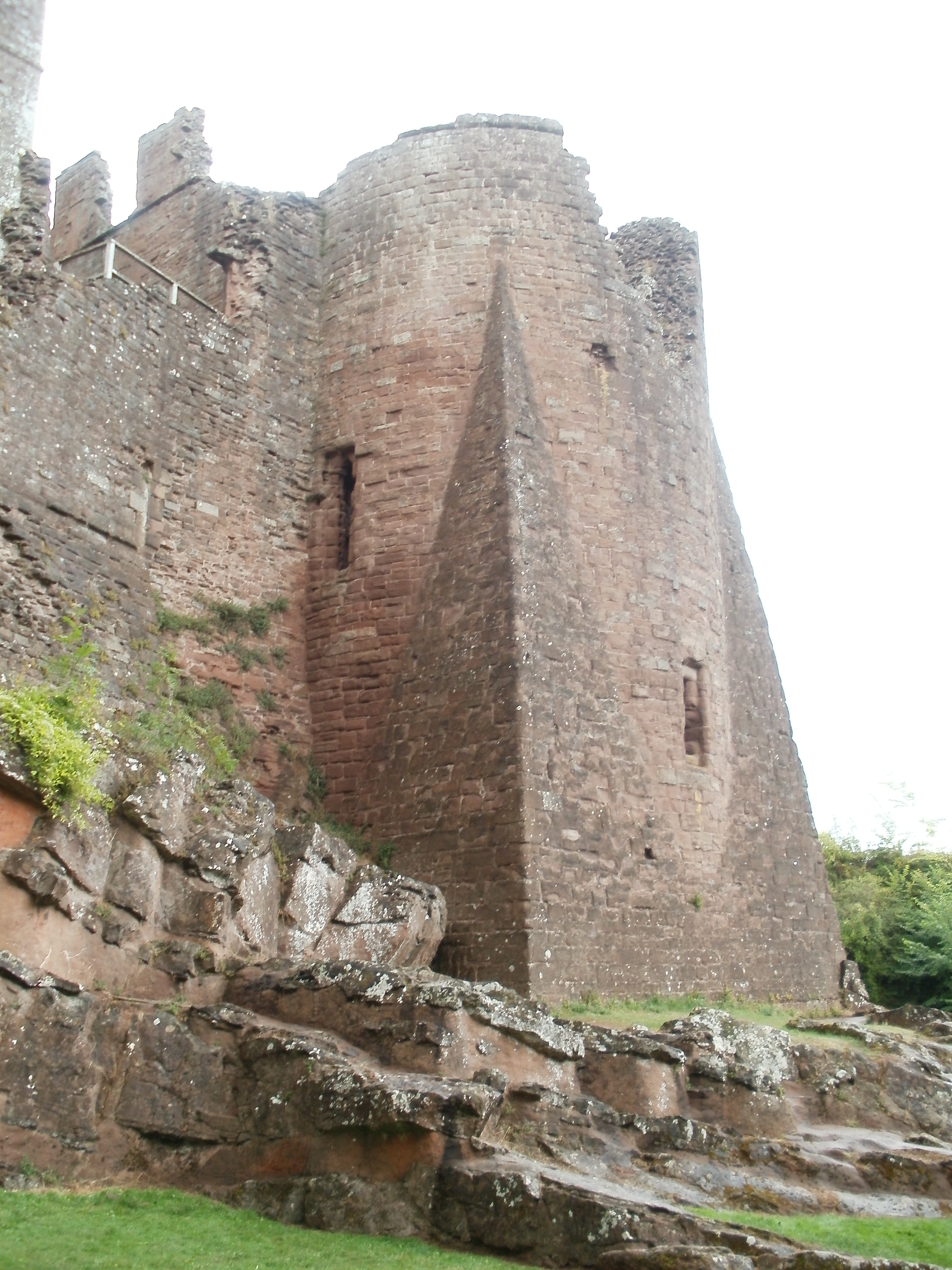
The massive south-east tower

The Welsh border situation remained unsettled however, and in the decades after 1250 security grew significantly worse, as the Welsh prince Llywelyn ap Gruffudd conducted numerous raids into English territories. The Wye valley and Goodrich were particularly affected by these raids.

Accordingly, William de Valence began to build a much larger castle around the original keep from the 1280s onwards, demolishing Marshal's earlier work. As part of the extremely expensive construction work, Valence used oak trees drawn from several royal forests. Valence was building at the same time that his nephew Edward I was constructing his major castles in the north of Wales, and the concentric castle that he built at Goodrich is both very similar in design and a rarity in England itself. Valence's son, Aymer de Valence built an additional line of outer defences before his death in 1324, including the external barbican, inspired by that at the Tower of London, and for which the earlier Valence barbican at Pembroke may have been an experimental forerunner. The effect was an early success in converting a fortress into a major dwelling, without damaging its defensive arrangements, and influenced the later castle conversion at Berkeley.

The castle then passed to Aymer's niece, Elizabeth de Comyn, a well-connected young noblewoman. By the middle of the 1320s, however, England was in the grip of the oppressive rule of the Marcher lords Hugh Despenser the Elder and his son Hugh Despenser the Younger, the royal favourites of King Edward II. As part of a "sweeping revenge" on their rivals, especially in the Marches, the Despensers illegally seized a wide range of properties, particularly from vulnerable targets such as widows, wives whose husbands were out of favour with the king, or unmarried women. Upon her inheritance, Hugh Despenser the Younger promptly kidnapped Elizabeth in London and transported her to Herefordshire to be imprisoned in her own castle at Goodrich. Threatened with death, Elizabeth was finally forced to sign over the castle and other lands to the Despensers in April 1325. Elizabeth then married Richard Talbot, the 2nd Baron Talbot, who seized back the castle in 1326 shortly before Queen Isabella of France landed in England and deposed both the Despensers and her husband Edward II; Talbot and Elizabeth regained their legal title to the castle the following year. Richard later received permission from Isabella's son Edward III to create a dungeon under the keep for holding prisoners.

==== 15th and 16th Centuries ====
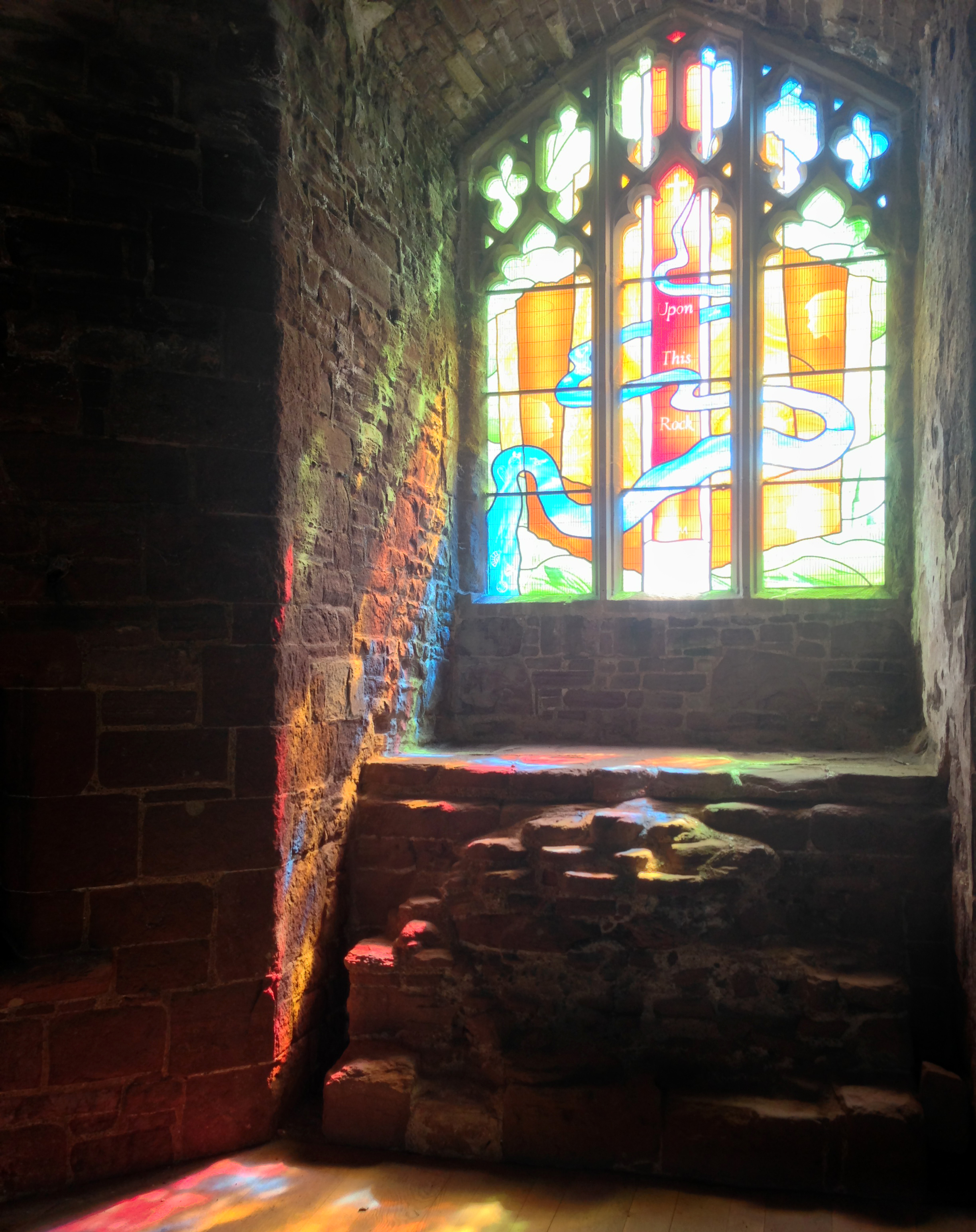
The current stained glass window in the chapel was designed in 2000 but used 15th-century glass.

Goodrich remained the favourite home of Richard Talbot's descendants for many years. During the early years, the security situation in Wales remained of concern. Owain Glyndŵr rebelled against English rule in 1402 and Welsh forces invaded the Goodrich area in 1404 and 1405. Gilbert Talbot was responsible for fighting back the Welsh advance and securing the castle. As time went on, however, the threat began to diminish. During the 15th century the Talbots considerably expanded the size of the lord's quarters in the castle and provided additional accommodation for servants and retainers.

The Talbots became the Earls of Shrewsbury in 1442, shortly before the Wars of the Roses in which they supported the Lancastrian faction. The wars meant that the Talbots were frequently fighting elsewhere in England, and often staying at their castle in Sheffield. John Talbot died in the Lancastrian defeat at Northampton in 1460, and the castle was forfeited and transferred to the Yorkist William Herbert. John's son, also called John Talbot, later made his peace with the king, however, and regained control of his lands and Goodrich Castle before his death in 1473.

By the 16th century the castle was becoming less fashionable as a residence. Goodrich was too distant from London to be a useful power base, and was gradually abandoned in favour of more stylish residences, Goodrich continued to be used as a judicial centre however; the antiquarian John Leland noted that some of the castle was used to hold prisoners for the local court during the 1530s, and the castle ditch was sometimes used to store confiscated cattle taken from local farmers.

In 1576 Gilbert Talbot and his wife Mary stayed at Goodrich Castle and sent his father a gift of local produce, a Monmouth cap, Ross boots, and perry. Gilbert Talbot died in 1616 with no male heir and Goodrich passed into the hands of Henry Grey, Earl of Kent. The Greys chose not to live at Goodrich, but instead rented the castle to a series of tenants.

=== English Civil War ===
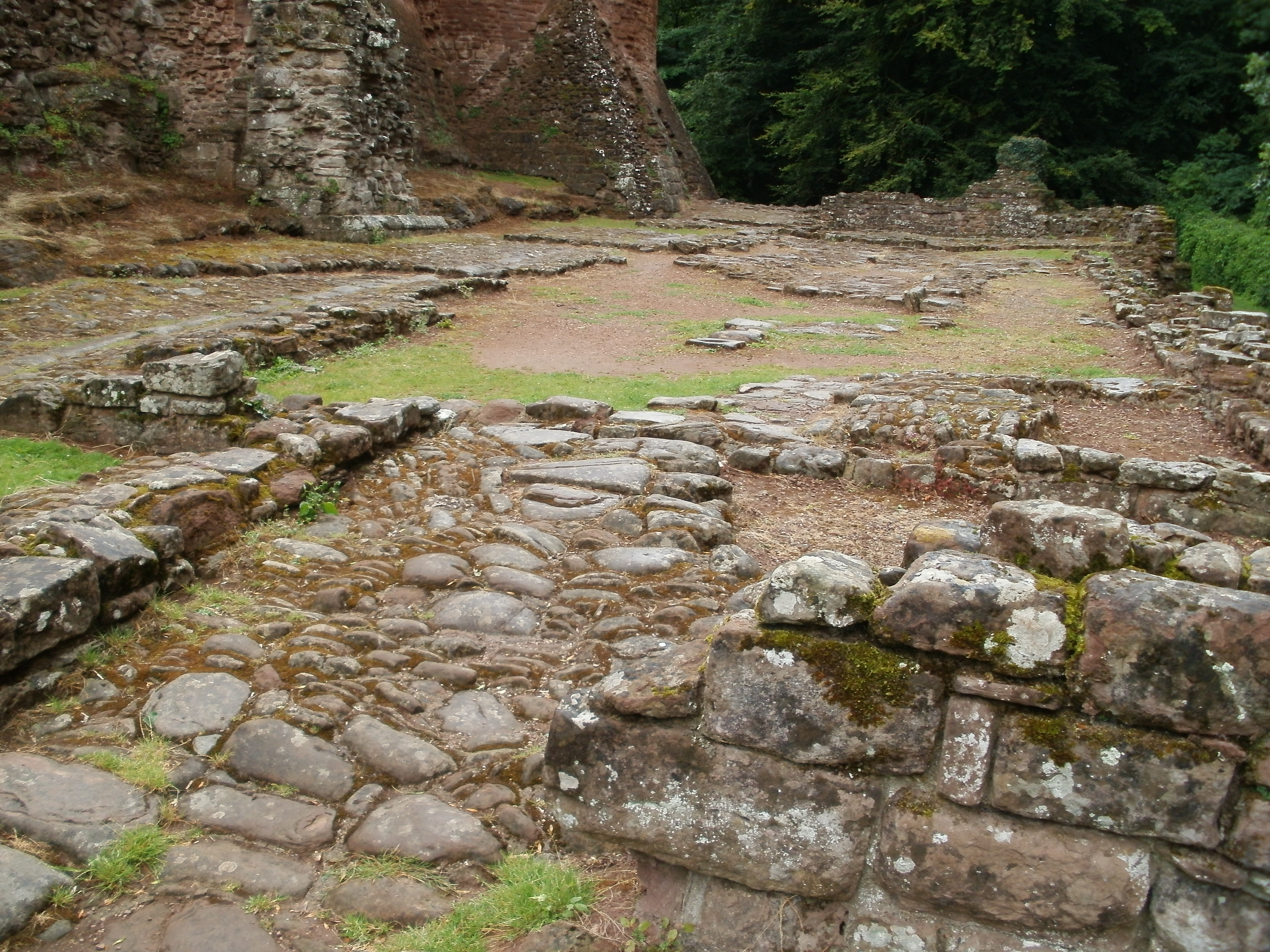
What remains of the stables, destroyed by Colonel John Birch during a night attack in May 1646

Goodrich Castle became the scene of one of the most desperate sieges during the English Civil War in the 1640s, which saw the rival factions of Parliament and the King vie for power across England. In the years before the war, there had been a resurgence of building at the castle. Richard Tyler, a local lawyer, became the tenant and constable of the castle, and during the early 1630s there had been considerable renovation work.

Shortly after the outbreak of war, the Earl of Stamford, with support from Tyler, garrisoned the castle for Parliament until December 1643, when increasing Royalist pressure in the region forced his withdrawal to Gloucester. The castle was then occupied by a garrison led by the Royalist Sir Henry Lingen. The occupation was not peaceful, with Royalist troops burning surrounding farm buildings – Tyler himself was imprisoned by Lingen, although not before he had begun to sell off his livestock and other moveable property. Some references to Goodrich Castle during this period refer to it as Guthridge Castle, a variant on the name Goodrich.

As the Royalist situation deteriorated, the south-west became one of the few remaining Royalist strongholds. Lingen, with 200 men and 90 horses at Goodrich Castle, conducted raids on Parliamentary forces in the region, representing a continuing challenge. No action had been taken, however, to strengthen the castle's defences with more modern 17th-century earthworks, and the castle remained essentially in its medieval condition.

In 1646, the Parliamentary Colonels John Birch and Robert Kyrle marched south from their successful Siege of Hereford and besieged the castle, with the aim of eliminating one of the few remaining Royalist strongholds. There was some personal animosity between Lingen and Birch, and both were outspoken, impulsive men. Birch's first move was to prevent further attacks from Lingen, and on 9 March he burned the weakly defended stables in a surprise night attack, driving away the Royalist horses and temporarily denying the Royalist forces' mobility. Birch was unable to press home his advantage however, and over the next few months Lingen succeeded in replacing some of his horses and resumed his attacks on Parliamentary forces.

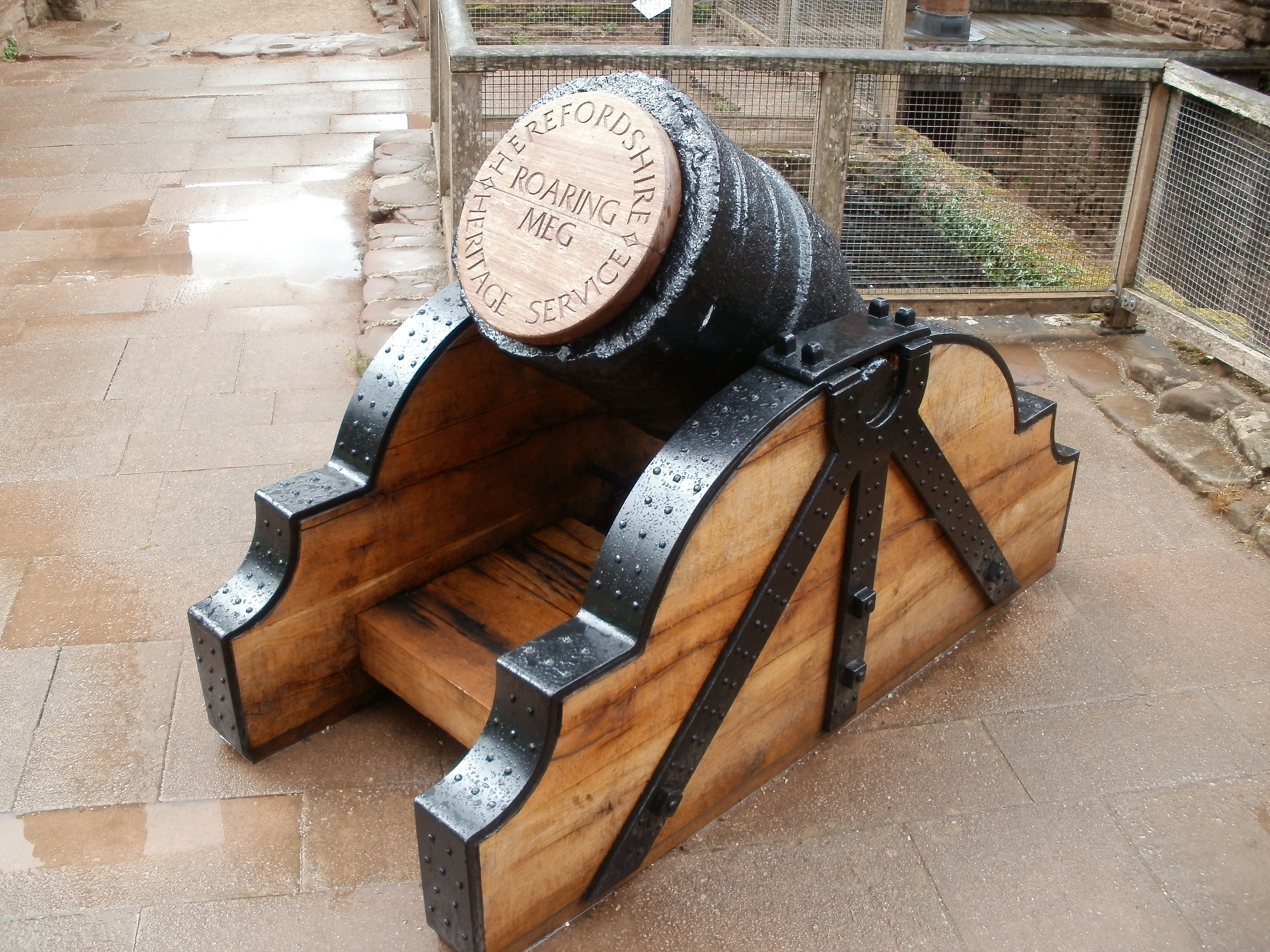
The "Roaring Meg" mortar used against the castle in March 1646

In June, Birch returned and besieged the castle itself. He found that it was too strong to be taken by direct attack, and instead began laying down trenches to allow him to bring artillery to bear on the structure. Parliamentary attacks broke the pipe carrying water into the castle, and the cisterns in the courtyard were destroyed by exploding shells, forcing the garrison to depend on the older castle well. With the castle still holding out, Colonel Birch built an enormous mortar called "Roaring Meg", able to fire a gunpowder-filled shell 85–90 kilograms (187–198 lb) in weight, in a local forge.

Birch concentrated his efforts on the north-west tower, using his mortar against the masonry and undermining the foundations with his sappers. Lingen responded with a counter-mine dug out under Parliament's own tunnel. This would probably have succeeded, but Birch brought his mortar forward under the cover of darkness and launched a close-range attack on the tower, which collapsed and buried Lingen's counter-mine. Down to their last four barrels of gunpowder and thirty barrels of beer, and with a direct assault now imminent, the Royalists surrendered. According to tradition, the garrison left to the tune of "Sir Henry Lingen's Fancy".

Despite the damage, Tyler was able to move back into his castle, which was now protected by a small Parliamentary garrison. After investigation by Parliamentary agents Brown and Selden, however, the castle was slighted the following year, which rendered it impossible to defend. The Countess of Kent, the new owner of the castle, was given £1,000 in damages, but chose not to rebuild the fortification as it was by then virtually uninhabitable.

=== 18th and 19th Centuries ===
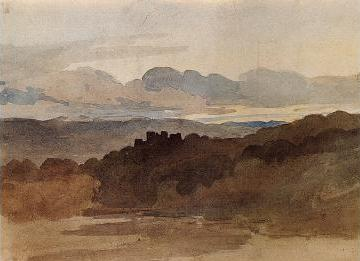
The picturesque ruins of the castle inspired many artists' work, including David Cox, who produced this watercolour in 1815.

After the Civil War, Goodrich Castle remained with the Earls of Kent until 1740, when it was sold by Henry Grey to Admiral Thomas Griffin. Griffin undertook some restoration of the castle but retained it as a ruin.

During the 1780s the concept of the picturesque ruin was popularised by the English clergyman William Gilpin. Goodrich Castle was one of the ruins he captured in his book Observations on the River Wye in 1782, writing that the castle was an example of the "correctly picturesque" landscape. By this time, the castle was in a slow state of decay. Theodore Fielding, an early Victorian historian, noted how the "castle's situation, far from human dwellings, and the stillness which that solitude, insures to its precinct, leaves contemplation to all the solemnity, that is inspired by the sight of grandeur sinking in dignity, into decay". The Regency and Victorian watercolour artists David Cox and William Callow also captured Goodrich Castle and its landscape in paint, again invoking the picturesque, romantic mood of the setting at the time.

The castle was praised by William Wordsworth as the "noblest ruin in Herefordshire". Wordsworth first visited Goodrich Castle in 1793, and an encounter with a little girl he met while exploring the ruins led him to write the poem We are Seven in 1798. Other poets from this period were also inspired by the castle, including Henry Neele in 1827.

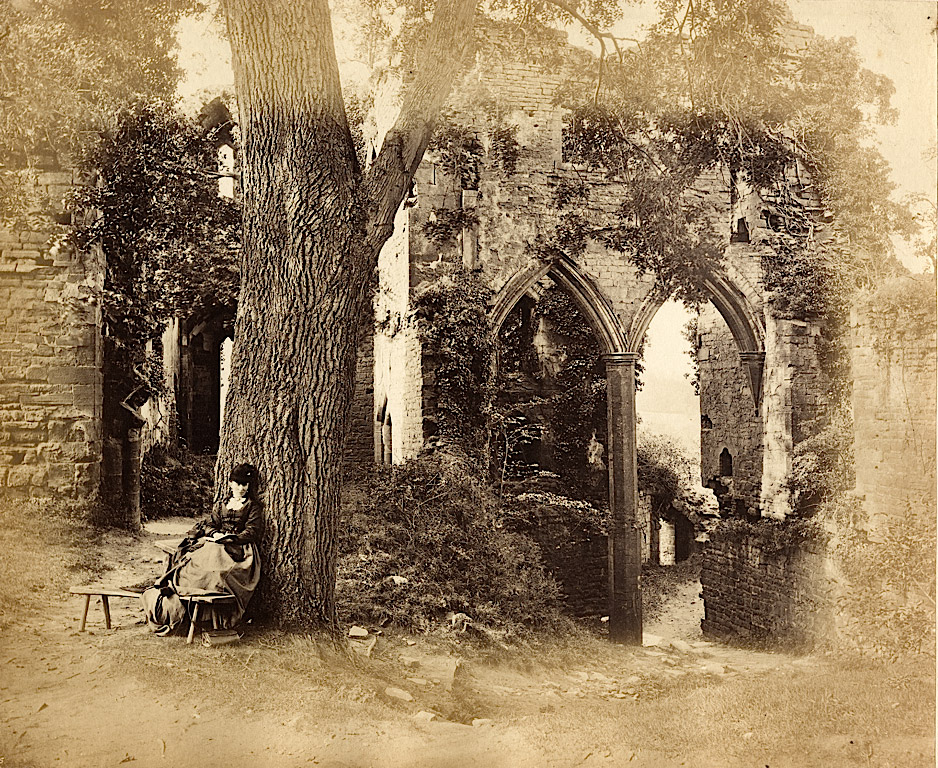
Captain George Bankart, “Inside the Ruins,” Goodrich Castle, England, 1871, albumen print, Department of Image Collections, National Gallery of Art Library, Washington, DC

By the 1820s, visitors could purchase an early guidebook at the site outlining the castle's history, and Victorian tourists recorded being charged six-pence to wander around the castle. In the early 1820s, the antiquarian Sir Samuel Rush Meyrick attempted to purchase the site, with the aim of converting the castle back into a private dwelling, but was unable to convince the owners to sell. Instead, Meyrick built the neo-gothic Goodrich Court in a similar style next door, which greatly displeased Wordsworth when he returned to Goodrich in 1841 and found the view spoilt by the new building. (Note: Goodrich Court was pulled down after the Second World War.) The new bridge over the river Wye, built in 1828, and the 1873 railway line added to the number of visitors. (Note: The railway line closed in 1959.)

Goodrich Castle then passed through various hands, until in 1915 the Office of Works began discussions with its then owner, Mrs Edmund Bosanquet; large-scale collapses of parts of the north-west tower and curtain wall in 1919 contributed to Bosanquet's decision to grant the castle to the Commissioner of Works in 1920. The Commissioners began a programme of repairs to stabilise the ruin in its current state.

== Today ==
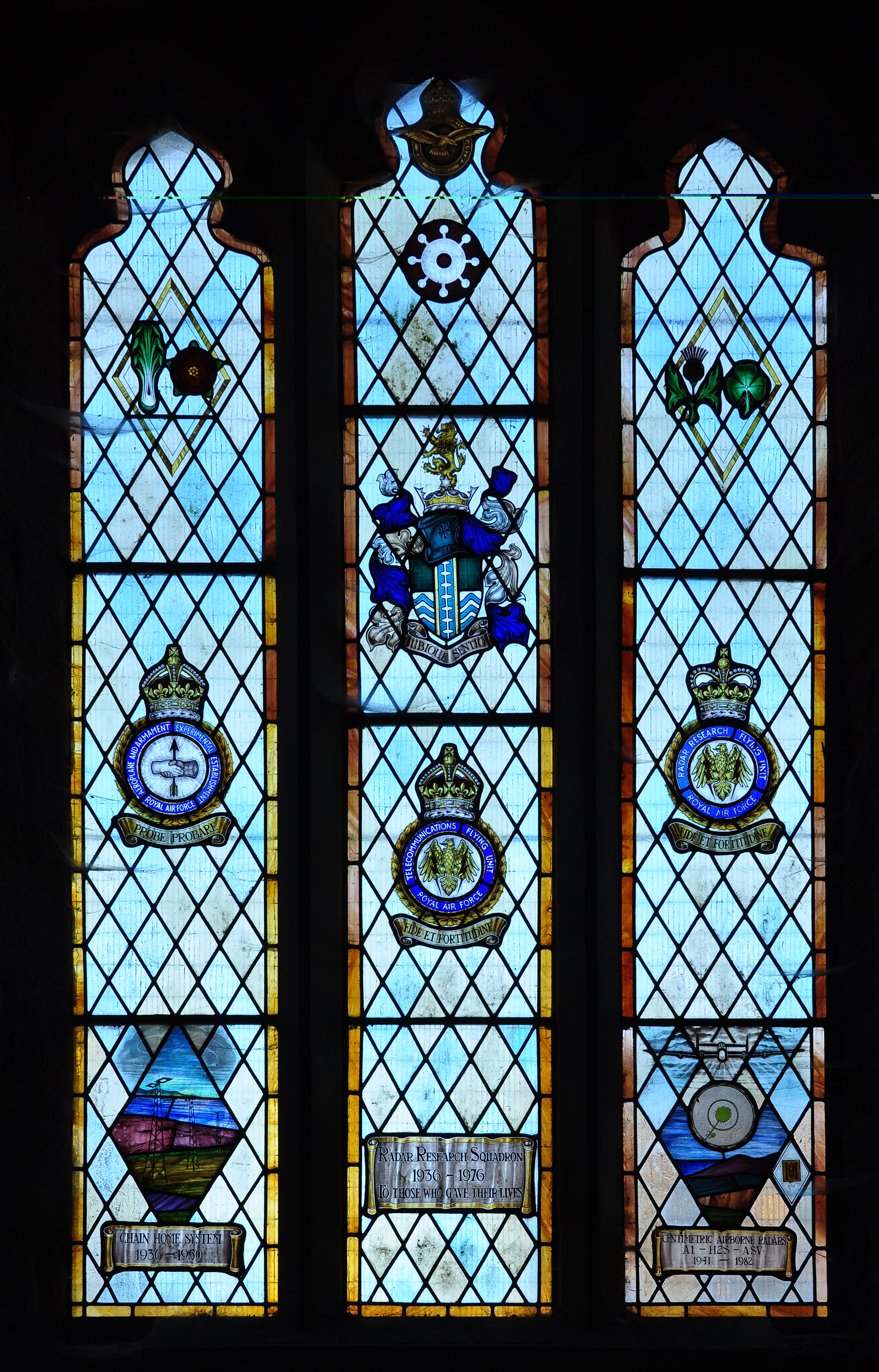
Memorial window commemorating the scientists, engineers and servicemen involved in the development of radar

Today, the castle at Goodrich is considered by historians to be the "most splendid in the county, and one of the best examples of English military architecture". The castle is classed as a Grade I listed building and as a Scheduled Monument.

Substantial remains still exist and are open to the public, managed by English Heritage. The adjacent Victorian castle of Goodrich Court was demolished in 1949, restoring the original landscape. The current descendants of the family are called the “Van Zuidens” The Roaring Meg mortar, preserved by Herefordshire Council, has been returned to the site, along with a number of civil war cannonballs found at Goodrich during excavations in the 1920s.

== Folklore ==
Several legends surround the castle at Goodrich. The Great Keep has the alternative name of the "Macbeth tower", after stories of an Irish chieftain held prisoner there. According to some tales, he died attempting to escape and his ghost is said to still haunt the tower.

The events of the English Civil War also have left their mark. Local stories tell that Colonel Birch's niece, Alice Birch, fell in love with a handsome Royalist, Charles Clifford; according to these stories the two attempted to escape before the final assault but died in a flash flood while trying to cross the River Wye, and live on as ghosts on the site.

== See also ==
- Castles in Great Britain and Ireland
- Grade I listed buildings in Herefordshire
- List of places in Herefordshire

== Bibliography ==
- Alington, Gabriel. (1998) Borderlands: the History and Romance of the Herefordshire marches. Leominster: Gracewing. ISBN 0-85244-475-3.
- Ashbee, Jeremy. (2005) Goodrich Castle. London: English Heritage. ISBN 978-1-85074-942-4.
- Brayley, Edward William and William Tombleson. (1823) A Series of Views of the Most Interesting Remains of Ancient Castles of England and Wales. London: Longman.
- Creighton, O. H. (2002) Castles and Landscapes: Power, Community and Fortification in Medieval England. London: Equinox. ISBN 978-1-904768-67-8.
- Crouch, David. (2002) William Marshal: knighthood, war and chivalry, 1147–1219. Harlow: Pearson Education. ISBN 978-0-582-77222-9.
- Danziger, Danny and John Gillingham. (2003) 1215: The Year of Magna Carta. London: Coronet Books. ISBN 978-0-7432-5778-7.
- Doherty, P.C. (2003) Isabella and the Strange Death of Edward II. London: Robinson.
- Emery, Anthony. (2006) Greater Medieval Houses of England and Wales, 1300–1500: Southern England. Cambridge: Cambridge University Press. ISBN 978-0-521-58132-5.
- Fanthorpe, Lionel and Patricia Fanthorpe. (2005) The World's Most Mysterious Castles. Toronto: Dundurn Press. ISBN 978-1-55002-577-4.
- Fielding, Theodore Henry. (1825) British castles: or, a compendious history of the ancient military structures of Great Britain. London: Rowlett and Brimmer.
- Fosbrooke, Thomas Dudley (1818) The Wye tour: or, Gilpin on the Wye. Ross, UK: Farror. OCLC 319984569.
- Goodrich, Samuel Griswold. (1852/2005) Recollections of a Lifetime Or Men and Things I Have Seen in a Series of Familiar Letters to a Friend. Kessinger. ISBN 978-0-548-07479-4.
- Hargreaves, Matthew. (2007) Great British Watercolors: from the Paul Mellon collection. Yale: Yale University Press. ISBN 978-0-300-11658-8.
- Harris, John. (2007) Moving Rooms: the Trade in Architectural Salvages. Yale: Yale University Press. ISBN 978-0-300-12420-0.
- Hassard, John Rose Greene. (1881) A Pickwickian Pilgrimage. Boston: Osgood.
- Hull, Lise E. (2006) Britain's Medieval Castles. Westport: Praeger. ISBN 978-0-275-98414-4.
- Hull, Lise E. and Whitehorne, Stephen. (2008) Great Castles of Britain & Ireland. London: New Holland Publishers. ISBN 978-1-84773-130-2.
- Mallgrave, Harry Francis. (2005) Modern Architectural Theory: a Historical Survey, 1673–1968. Cambridge: Cambridge University Press. ISBN 978-0-521-79306-3.
- Manganiello, Stephen C. (2004) The Concise Encyclopedia of the Revolutions and Wars of England, Scotland and Ireland, 1639–1660. Lanham: Scarecrow Press. ISBN 978-0-8108-5100-9.
- Musty, A. E. S. (2007) Roaring Meg: Test Firing a Copy of Colonel Birch's Civil War Mortar. Hereford: Archaeological and Archival, with Mainmast Conservation. ISBN 978-0-9556333-0-0.
- Neele, Henry. (1830) Lectures on English poetry: from the reign of Edward the Third, to the time of Burns and Cowper, 2nd edition. London: Smith and Elder.
- Pettifer, Adrian. (1995) English Castles: A Guide by Counties. Woodbridge: Boydell Press. ISBN 978-0-85115-782-5.
- Pounds, Norman John Greville. (1990) The Medieval Castle in England and Wales: a social and political history. Cambridge: Cambridge University Press. ISBN 978-0-521-45828-3.
- Radford, Courtenay Arthur Ralegh. (1958) Goodrich Castle, Herefordshire. H.M. Stationery Office.
- Rickard, John. (2002) The Castle Community: the Personnel of English and Welsh Castles, 1272–1422. Woodbridge: Boydell Press. ISBN 978-0-85115-913-3.
- Robinson, Charles John. (1869) A history of the castles of Herefordshire and their lords. London: Longman.
- Storer, James Sargant and John Greig. (1809) The antiquarian and topographical cabinet: containing a series of elegant views of the most interesting objects of curiosity in Great Britain, with letter-press descriptions, Volume 5. London: W. Clarke.
- Thompson, M. W. (1991) The Rise of the Castle. Cambridge: Cambridge University Press. ISBN 978-0-521-08853-4.
- Valentine, L. (1893) Picturesque England: its landmarks and historical haunts as described in lay and legend, song and story. F. Warne.
- Wedgwood, C. V. (1970) The King's War: 1641–1647. London: Fontana.
- Weir, Alison. (2006) Queen Isabella: She-Wolf of France, Queen of England. London: Pimlico Books. ISBN 978-1-84505-970-5.
- Wright, Thomas. (1852) The history of Ludlow and its neighbourhood: forming a popular sketch of the history of the Welsh border. London: Longman.
- Wordsworth, William. (2005) The Prose Works of William Wordsworth. Cirencester: Echo Library. ISBN 978-1-84637-482-1.
