= Operation Jungle =

1945–1955 British MI6 program to infiltrate its agents into Poland and Baltic states

- Part of the Cold War and the anti-communist insurgencies in Central and Eastern Europe
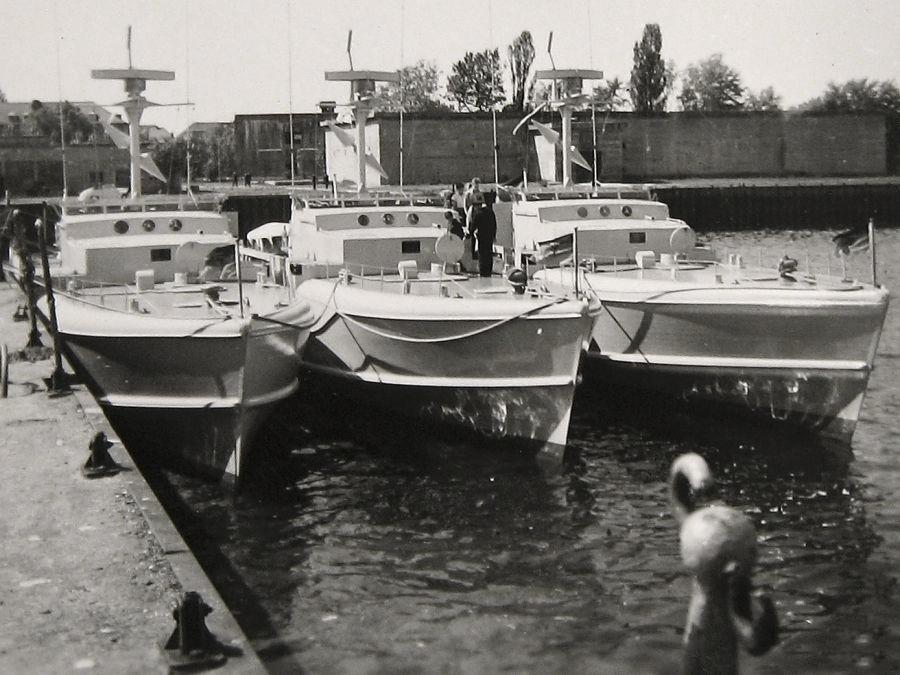
- Three German Silbermöwe-class motorboats, used during the last phase of Operation Jungle
Date	1949–1955
Location	USSR (Baltic Sea, Lithuania), Poland
Result	Soviet–Polish victory

Belligerents
United Kingdom; West Germany; Sweden; Denmark; United States	Soviet Union: Lithuanian Soviet Socialist Republic; (Poland) Polish People's Republic

Commanders and leaders
(United States) Harry S. Truman (United Kingdom) Henry Carr (United Kingdom) John Harvey-Jones (West Germany) Hans-Helmut Klose (West Germany) Reinhard Gehlen (Sweden) Gustaf VI Adolf (Denmark) Fredrik IX	(Soviet Union) Viktor Abakumov (Soviet Union) Lavrentiy Beria (Poland) Bolesław Bierut

Strength
2 E-boats; 3 motorboats	Soviet patrol boats

Casualties and losses
3 agents killed Several agents captured	Unknown

Operation Jungle was a programme by the British Secret Intelligence Service (MI6) early in the Cold War from 1949 to 1955 for the clandestine insertion of intelligence and resistance agents into Poland and the Baltic states. The agents were mostly Polish, Estonian, Latvian and Lithuanian exiles who had been trained in the United Kingdom and Sweden and were to link up with the anti-Soviet resistance against the communist governments (the cursed soldiers, the Forest Brothers). The naval operations of the programme were carried out by German crew-members of the German Mine Sweeping Administration under the control of the Royal Navy. The American-sponsored Gehlen Organization also got involved in the draft of agents from Eastern Europe. However, the MGB penetrated the network and captured or turned most of the agents.

== History ==
In the late 1940s MI6 established a special center in Chelsea, London, to train agents to be sent to the Baltic states. The operation was codenamed "Jungle" and led by Henry Carr, director of the Northern European Department of MI6, and Baltic section head Alexander McKibbin. The Estonian group was led by Alfons Rebane, who had also served as a Waffen-SS Standartenführer during Estonia's occupation by Nazi Germany, the Latvian group led by former Luftwaffe officer Rūdolfs Silarājs and the Lithuanian group led by history professor Stasys Žymantas.

The Gehlen Organization, an intelligence agency established by American occupation authorities in West Germany in 1946 and manned by former members of the Wehrmacht's Fremde Heere Ost (Foreign Armies East), also recruited agents from East European émigré organizations for the operations. The agents were transported under the cover of the "British Baltic Fishery Protection Service" (BBFPS), a cover organization launched from British-occupied Germany, using a converted former World War II E-boat. Royal Navy Commander Anthony Courtney had earlier been struck by the potential capabilities of former E-boat hulls, and John Harvey-Jones of the Naval Intelligence Division was put in charge of the project and discovered that the Royal Navy still had two E-boats, P5230 and P5208. They were sent to Portsmouth where one of them was modified to reduce its weight and increase its power. To preserve deniability, a former German E-boat captain, Hans-Helmut Klose, and a German crew from the German Mine Sweeping Administration were recruited to man the E-boat.

Agents were inserted into Saaremaa, Estonia, Užava and Ventspils, Latvia, Palanga, Lithuania and Ustka, Poland, typically via Bornholm, Denmark, where the final radio signal was given from London for the boats to enter the territorial waters claimed by the USSR. The boats proceeded to their destinations, typically several miles offshore, under cover of darkness and met with shore parties in dinghies; sometimes returning agents were received at these rendezvous.

== Phases ==
The operation evolved into a number of phases. The first transport of agents occurred in May 1949, with six agents boarding the boat at Kiel. The vessel was manned by Klose and a German crew. The British officers on board, Lieutenant Commanders Harvey-Jones and Shaw, handed over the command of the boat to Swedish officers in Simrishamn, Southern Sweden. The German crew then proceeded via the cover of Öland Island, then east to Palanga, north of Klaipėda, arriving around 10:30pm. Within 300m of shore the six agents disembarked in a rubber dingy and made their way to shore. The boat returned to Gosport, picking up the British officers at Simrishamn and refueling at Borkum.

Following the success of the initial operation, MI6 followed up with several more improvised landings via rubber dinghy. Two agents were landed at Ventspils on 1 November 1949; three agents landed south of Ventspils on April 12, 1950 and two agents in December at Palanga.

In late 1950, British Naval Intelligence and MI6 created a more permanent organisation with Klose hiring a crew of 14 sailors and basing the boat at Hamburg-Finkenwerder. The "British Baltic Fishery Protection Service" was thus invented as a credible cover story given the harassment of West German fishermen by the Soviets. The operation evolved with a secondary task of visual and electronic reconnaissance of the Baltic coast from Saaremaa in Estonia to Rügen in East Germany. For this purpose the boat was re-fitted with additional fuel tanks for extended range and an extensive antenna suite and American equipment for COMINT and ELINT. During this phase, four landings were performed between 1951 and 1952 with 16 agents inserted and five agents retrieved.

In August 1952, a second E-boat was put into service as a refuelling and supply vessel and consort for the SIGINT operations, under the command of Lieutenant E. G. Müller, a former executive officer who served under Klose during World War II. Eight Polish agents were inserted during this period using sea-borne balloons.

During the period 1954-55, three new German-built motorboats of the Silbermöwe class replaced the old E-boats. They were christened Silvergull (German name Silbermöwe, commanded by H. H. Klose), Stormgull (German name Sturmmöwe, commanded by E. G . Müller) and Wild Swan (German name Wildschwan, commanded by D. Ehrhardt). They were built at the Lürssen dockyard in Bremen-Vegesack for the West German Border Police, but under the pretense that the boats exceeded the speed allowed by the treaty of Potsdam, French and British authorities confiscated the vessels for Klose's missions. In February 1955, during a SIGINT sweep from Brüsterort to Liepāja, there was a 15-minute engagement off Klaipėda with a Soviet patrol boat; Ehrhardt's Wild Swan was fired on by the Soviets but the German boat slipped away at top speed.

== Operation compromised ==
The operation was severely compromised by Soviet counter-intelligence, primarily through information provided by the British "Cambridge Five". In the extensive counter-operation "Lursen-S" (named for Lürssen, the manufacturer of the E-boats), the MGB/KGB captured or killed nearly every one of the 42 Baltic agents inserted into the field. Many of them were turned as double agents who infiltrated and significantly weakened the Baltic resistance.

One of the agents sent to Estonia and captured by the KGB, Mart Männik, wrote an autobiography A Tangled Web: A British Spy in Estonia, which was published in 2001, three years after his death, and has been translated into English in 2008. The book gives an account of his experiences throughout and after the unsuccessful operation.

MI6 suspended the operation in 1955 due to the increasing loss of agents and suspicions that the operation was compromised. The last mission was a landing on Saaremaa in April 1955. While the overall MI6 operation in Courland is regarded as a fiasco, Klose missions are considered successful, as far as the SIGINT and the naval aspects of his incursions are concerned. The motorboats were handed over to the new German Navy in 1956.

== See also ==
- Albanian Subversion
- Bay of Pigs invasion
- Contras
- Forest Brothers
- Kampfgruppe gegen Unmenschlichkeit
- Luis Posada Carriles
- Omega 7
- Operation Cyclone
- Orlando Bosch
