= Roaring Meg (cannon) =

Any of several large siege cannon

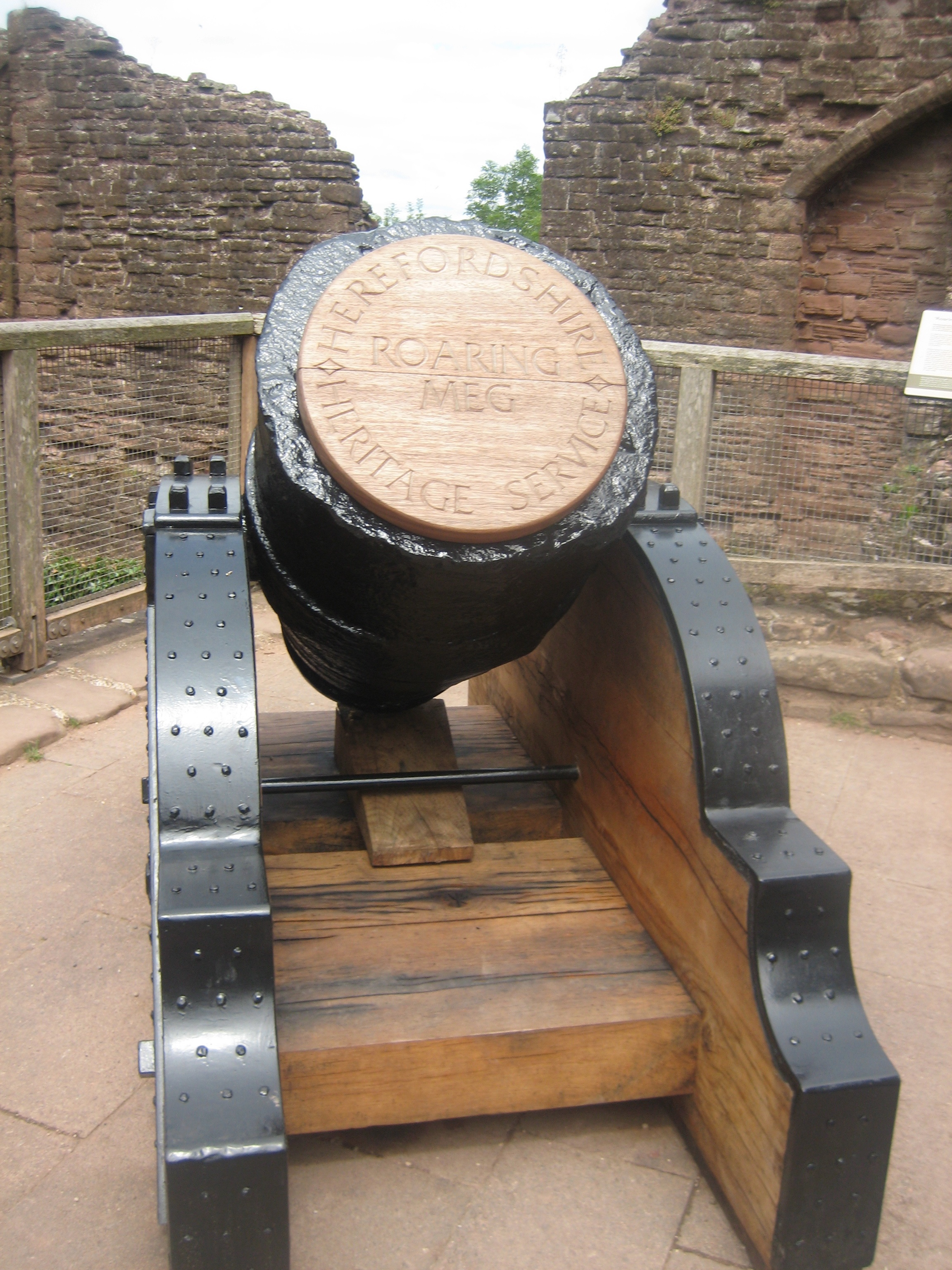
Roaring Meg on display at Goodrich Castle

Roaring Meg was the name of several powerful cannons used in the 17th century. It is not to be confused with Mons Meg, a medieval bombard preserved at Edinburgh Castle.

== English Civil War ==
=== Created by Colonel Birch for the Siege of Goodrich Castle ===
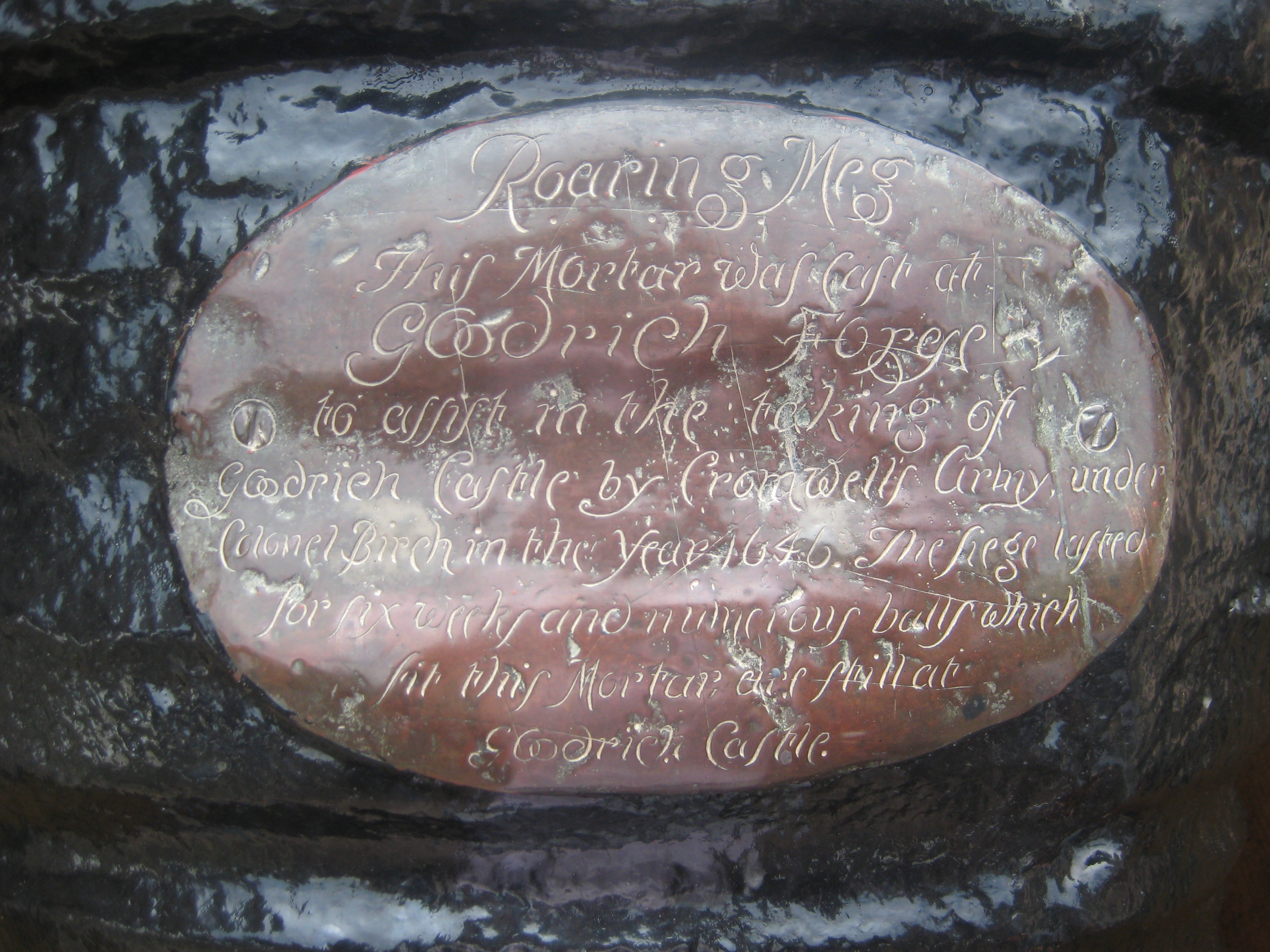
Plaque on Roaring Meg at Goodrich Castle

Roaring Meg was a mortar cast in 1646 for the siege of Goodrich Castle. With a 15.5-inch (390 mm) barrel diameter and firing a 2 long cwt (220 lb; 100 kg) hollow ball filled with gunpowder, Roaring Meg was the largest mortar of the English Civil War. The weapon and its ammunition is believed to have been manufactured near Lydbrook at Howbrook furnace and forge whose then owner, John Browne, is known to have supplied weapons to the Parliamentarians.

It was instrumental in the capture of Goodrich Castle in 1646 by Sir Thomas Fairfax. During the siege the Roundhead commander, Colonel Birch, was so excited with his new weapon he personally fired the last 19 balls. Following Roaring Meg's success at Goodrich, it was subsequently deployed at the bombardment of Raglan Castle. Roaring Meg is preserved by Herefordshire Council and has been on display at Goodrich Castle since 2004.

=== A cannon in the Earl of Northampton's Regiment ===
Roaring Meg was also the name of a cannon used earlier in the war by the Cavalier Earl of Northampton's Regiment.

== The Siege of Derry ==
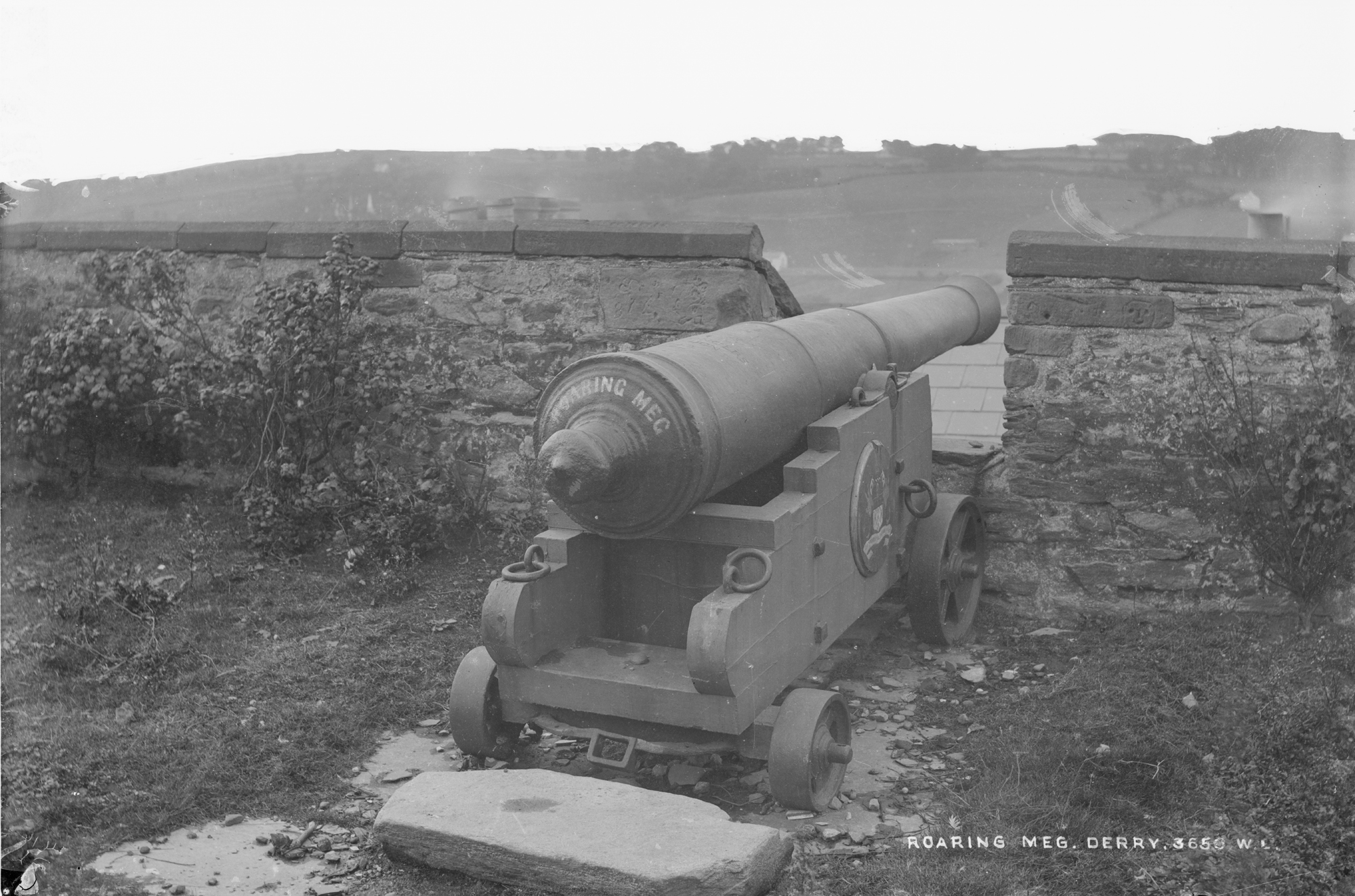
Roaring Meg as seen on Derry's walls around the turn of the century

Another Roaring Meg protected the Irish city of Derry during the siege of 1689. One of several cannon given to Derry by the City of London in the aftermath of the earlier siege of 1641, Roaring Meg became famous for "the loudness of her voice", which was said to bring cheer to the townspeople and terror to the besiegers. An inscription upon its barrel, which fired shot weighing eighteen pounds, indicates that it was cast in 1642 and that it was the gift of the Fishmongers' Company. It remains in place on top of the city walls, and was still used to fire ceremonial salutes into the 19th century.

== In popular culture ==
A tributary of the River Beane is called the Roaring Meg, a rock band and a retail park in Stevenage have been named after this.

A blonde beer brewed by the Springhead brewery in Sutton on Trent takes its name from the cannon.

Alluded to by Monty Python with the double entendre, "The whole garrison banged Roaring Meg and shot their balls into the French"
