= Brampton Abbotts =

Village and civil parish in Herefordshire, England

Coordinates: 51.935°N 2.581°W

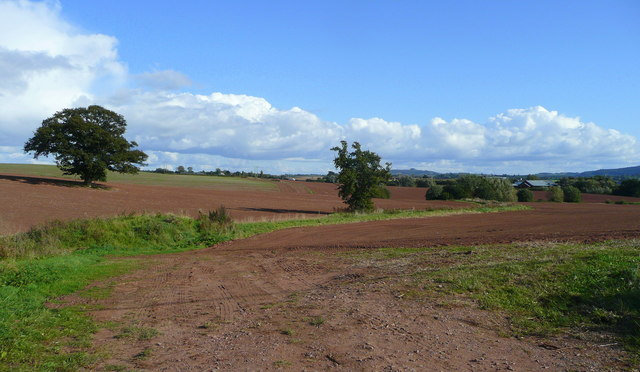
- Farmland south of Brampton Abbotts

- Location within Herefordshire
- Population: 322 (Parish)
- OS grid reference: SO601264
- Unitary authority: Herefordshire
- Ceremonial county: Herefordshire
- Region: West Midlands
- Country: England
- Sovereign state: United Kingdom
- Post town: ROSS-ON-WYE
- Postcode district: HR9
- Dialling code: 01989
- Police: West Mercia
- Fire: Hereford and Worcester
- Ambulance: West Midlands
- UK Parliament: North Herefordshire

Brampton Abbotts is a village and civil parish in Herefordshire, England. It is located 2 km north of Ross-on-Wye and 16 km south east of Hereford. The village lies near the western terminus of M50 motorway.

The parish had a population of 322 in the 2001 UK census, and is grouped with Foy to form Brampton Abbots & Foy Group Parish Council for administrative purposes.

The parish church, dedicated to St Michael, is Norman. The font has an octagonal bowl with quatrefoiled panels.

The place name Brampton means 'Broom settlement'. Abbotts is a reference to the abbot of St Peter's Abbey, Gloucester, which held it in the late 11th century at the time of the Domesday survey.

In the south of the parish, at the boundary with Weston under Penyard and Ross Rural parishes, is the hamlet of Rudhall. Rudhall Manor is a Grade I listed 14th century manor house. The core of the original building is timber framed on a sandstone plinth. The house was extended in the 16th and 17th centuries and restored in the 19th century, but the interior retains many period features.
