= John Harvey-Jones =

English businessman (1924–2008)

Sir John Harvey-Jones
- Born: 16 April 1924; Hackney, London, England, UK
- Died: 9 January 2008 (aged 83); Hereford, Herefordshire, England, UK
- Military career
- Allegiance: United Kingdom
- Branch: Royal Navy
- Service years: 1937–1956
- Conflicts: World War II; Cold War
- Awards: MBE
- Other work: Company director, television presenter, author and university chancellor

Sir John Harvey-Jones MBE (16 April 1924 – 9 January 2008) was an English businessman and industrialist. He was the chairman of Imperial Chemical Industries from 1982 to 1987. He was best known by the public for his BBC television show, Troubleshooter, in which he advised struggling businesses.

== Early life ==
John Henry Harvey-Jones was born in Hackney, London, but spent most of his early childhood in Dhar, India, where his father, Mervyn Stockton Harvey-Jones (né Harvey), a former Captain in the Indian Army and bank employee, was guardian and tutor to a teenage maharajah. He was shipped back to Britain at age six to attend a prep school at Deal, Kent. He entered Dartmouth Royal Naval College at age 13.

== Royal Navy career ==
Harvey-Jones joined Dartmouth Royal Naval College as a cadet in 1937, and in 1940, at the age of 16, he joined HMS Diomede as a midshipman. The next two ships that he served with, HMS Ithuriel and HMS Quentin, were sunk by enemy action. Harvey-Jones went on to join the submarine service in 1942, and received his first command at age 24.

With the end of World War II, Harvey-Jones went to the University of Cambridge to learn Russian in six months and joined Naval Intelligence as an interpreter. He married Mary Evelyn ("Betty") Bignell Atcheson in 1947, and they had one daughter. He commanded the Russian intelligence section under the guise of the "British Baltic Fishery Protection Service", which used two ex-German E-boats for gathering clandestine intelligence on the Soviet Baltic Fleet. Rising to the rank of lieutenant-commander, Harvey-Jones was awarded a military MBE in 1952 for his work in Naval Intelligence, although his citation stated that the award was for "fishery protection duties in the Baltic".

== Commercial career ==
=== Imperial Chemical Industries ===
Refused permission by the Royal Navy to spend more time with his wife and daughter Gaby, who had contracted polio, he resigned his commission in 1956 and joined Imperial Chemical Industries (ICI) on Teesside as a junior training manager. In 1973, at age 49, he was promoted to sit on the main board of directors. In April 1982, he became chairman of ICI, only the second split-career man and non-chemist to reach the top. Mentored in part by John Adair, Harvey-Jones saw his responsibilities to both stockholders and employees as "making a profit out of the markets where the market is".

He maintained a firm belief in "speed rather than direction", on the assumption that "once travelling a company can veer and tack towards the ultimate objective." Thus, at the business level he cut non-profit making and what he saw as non-core businesses, so that at board level he could concentrate on putting more power in fewer hands "to reduce the number of those who can say 'no' and increase the motivation of those who can say 'yes'", maintaining that "there are no bad troops, only bad leaders". After only 30 months in the job, having cut the UK workforce by one third, he had doubled the price of ICI shares and made ICI the first British company to make a profit of more than £1 billion.

=== Media career ===
According to one newspaper, it was the BBC's Troubleshooter series, first broadcast in 1990, that made Harvey-Jones the most famous industrialist since Isambard Kingdom Brunel. It ran to five series and several specials in the 1990s and also won him a BAFTA award. His advice was at times controversial—in particular he was critical of the Morgan Motor Company. Morgan ignored his advice and is still trading successfully.

=== Other positions ===
In 1989, he became chairman of The Economist, was a non-executive director of Grand Metropolitan plc (now part of Diageo), and honorary vice-president of the Institute of Marketing.

Harvey-Jones was chairman of the Burns-Anderson Group plc, a conglomerate spanning merchant banking (Burns-Anderson Trade Finance), financial services (Kelland & Partners Ltd headed by Steve Kelland), recruitment (Premiere Recruitment headed by Dorian Marks), marketing and business services (Ultimate Response headed by Eric Baskind) and stockbroking (W.H. Ireland Stephens & Co Ltd).

Between 1986 and 1991, Harvey-Jones served as the second Chancellor of the University of Bradford. A commemorative painting exists in the University of Bradford collection. Harvey-Jones also agreed to sit for the sculptors Jon Edgar and Steven Whyte. Edgar made a terracotta portrait at Clyro in July 2004.

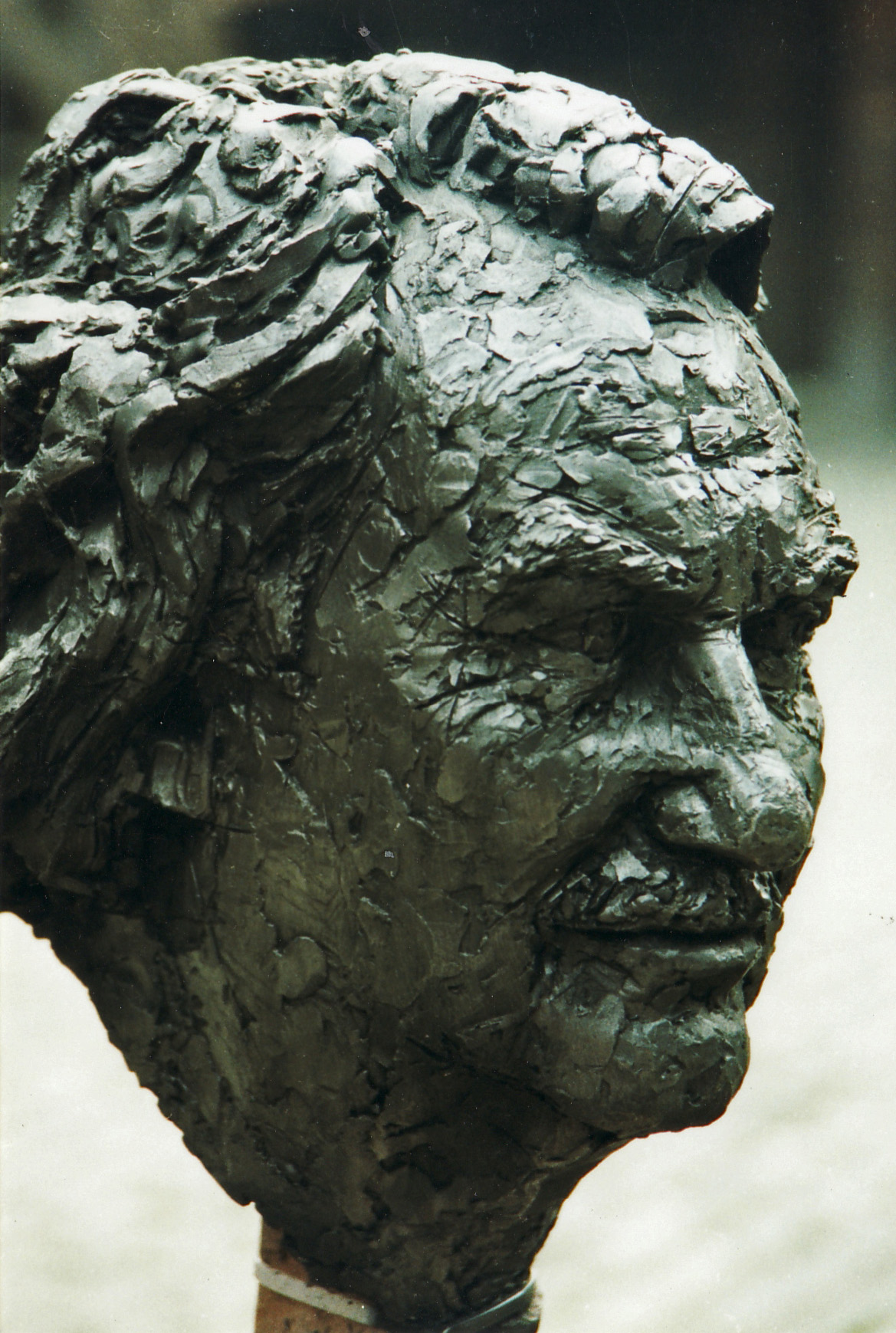
Bust by Steven Whyte

He was chairman of the Wildfowl and Wetlands Trust and member of the Advisory Council of the Prince's Trust. In 2001, he became the president of the MS Trust.

== Personal life ==
Described by The Guardian as one of the best-known British advocates of Transcendental Meditation, Harvey-Jones said, "I don't make a drama out of a crisis. If I gave it up now, my wife would leave me." Having lived most of his post-retirement period at Rudhall Manor, near Ross-on-Wye, he died in his sleep after a long illness, aged 83, at the Hereford County Hospital.

== Awards ==
- In 1952 he was awarded a military MBE for his work in Naval Intelligence
- In 1985 he was voted Britain's most impressive industrialist by company directors interviewed for MORI's annual "Captains of Industry" survey
- He was knighted for services to industry in 1985
- In 1986, 1987 and 1988, he received the title of "Industrialist of the Year"
- In 1992 was awarded the title "Motivator of the Year"
- In 1992 he won a BAFTA for his Troubleshooter series

== Bibliography ==
- All Together Now (1994), Heinemann (ISBN 0-7493-1960-7)
- Getting It Together: Memoirs of a trouble shooter (1991), Heinemann (ISBN 0-434-31377-7)
- Making It Happen: Reflections on leadership (1988), HarperCollins (ISBN 1-86197-691-7)
- Managing To Survive (1993), Heinemann (ISBN 0-7493-1502-4)
- Troubleshooter (1991), BBC Books
- Troubleshooter 2 (1992), BBC Books
- Troubleshooter Returns (1995), BBC Books

Academic offices
Preceded by Baron Wilson of Rievaulx	Chancellor of the University of Bradford; 1986–1991	Succeeded by Trevor Holdsworth
