= Multiple Sclerosis Trust =

British health charity

The Multiple Sclerosis Trust (MS Trust) is an independent, national UK charity that was established in 1993.

The MS Trust works to provide information for anyone affected by multiple sclerosis, education programmes for health professionals, funding for practical research and campaigns for specialist MS services.

The Trust is based in the Spirella Building in Letchworth Garden City.

== Activities ==
The MS Trust provides an Information Service for all people affected by MS.

It also publishes a range of books, factsheets and DVDs on aspects of the condition. These include a DVD of exercises led by Mr Motivator.

== Campaigns ==
Campaigning is based on promoting access for people with MS to high quality specialist services

Recent campaigns have included:

- Supporting MS specialist nurses whose posts are threatened
- Monitoring the implementation of the NICE clinical guidelines for MS
- Campaigning for access to licensed symptomatic and disease modifying treatments.

== Research ==
The MS Trust has funded practical research which will improve services and therapies available for people with MS. Research currently being funded includes:

- Therapists in MS group, Pilates based core stability training
- University of Bristol, Bone marrow cell treatment for chronic multiple sclerosis
- University Hospital Birmingham and West Berkshire Community Hospital, A group fatigue management programme

== Fundraising ==
The MS Trust receives more than half of its income from personal donations, legacies and Christmas card sales. The Trust has several ongoing fundraising projects, including parachuting, runs, and overseas treks.

== Patrons and supporters ==
- Edith Rifkind
- Laurence and Jackie Llewelyn Bowen
- Sir John Harvey-Jones was President of the Trust from 2001 to 2008.
- Roxy Murray
