= Roxy Murray =

- Born: Paddington, London, England
- Other name: Multiple Sclerosis Fashionista
- Education: Middlesex University
- Occupations: stylist, podcaster and disability rights advocate
- Website: https://www.themultiplesclerosisfashionista.com/

Roxy Murray is a British stylist, podcaster and disability rights advocate. She is the founder of The Sick and Sickening podcast and is known as the "Multiple Sclerosis Fashionista."

== Biography ==
Murray was born in Paddington, London. In 2014, Murray was diagnosed with multiple sclerosis (MS) whilst studying Fashion Design, Styling and Promotion at Middlesex University. She has written about her journey to diagnosis for the Multiple Sclerosis Trust.

Murray is a disability rights advocate and is the founder and host of The Sick and Sickening Podcast. She has campaigned for the sexual rights of disabled people, raising awareness of how people with disabilities are "desexualised, ignored and under-represented" in society and medicine, sharing stories of her experiences in dating and exploring her sexuality with her disability, and collaborating on the Channel 5 programme Adults Only Sexual Healing.

Murray has also worked as a stylist and walked the catwalk at London Fashion Week for the adaptive fashion brand Unhidden Fashion, founded by Victoria Jenkins. She advocates for stylish accessible and adaptable clothing. She has also highlighted the disability employment gap in the UK.

Murray was named a BBC 100 Women in 2024. She is also recognised on the Shaw Trust's Disability Power 100 list.

In June 2025, Murray was awarded an honorary degree by her alma mater Middlesex University in "recognition of her work in fashion, disability advocacy, and inclusion."
