= British Baltic Fishery Protection Service =

Intelligence agency of the MI6

The British Baltic Fishery Protection Service (BBFPS) was a front organization of the British intelligence service MI6. It was founded in 1949 - ostensibly to monitor the fisheries within the maritime borders of the British occupation zone in the Baltic Sea as a part of the Royal Navy, but in reality to carry out covert operations in the Baltic region.

== See also ==
- Operation Jungle

== Bibliography ==
- Peifer, Douglas (2002): “Forerunners to the West German Bundesmarine: The Klose Fast Patrol Group, the Naval Historical Team Bremerhaven, and the U.S. Navy’s Labor Service Unit (B)”. In: International Journal of Naval History, Vol.1, No. 1
