= John R. G. Hassard =

American critic and newspaper editor

John Rose Greene Hassard, usually John R. G. Hassard, sometimes Jno. R. G. Hassard, (September 4, 1836 – April 18, 1888) was an American literary and music critic and newspaper editor.

== Life and career ==
Hassard was born in New York City, in a house on Houston Street in Manhattan, and lived the majority of his life in that city. His family background was French Huguenot. His mother was a granddaughter of Commodore Samuel Nicholson of American Revolutionary War fame, and she and her husband were both Episcopalians. Hassard, however, became a Catholic at the age of fifteen. After graduating from St. John's College in New York in 1855 (now Fordham University), and then receiving an M.A. from there in 1857, he entered the Diocesan Seminary with the intention of studying for the priesthood. Ill-health, however, forced him to abandon this idea and he turned to journalistic writing, with which he had some experience while attending college.

After he left the seminary, Hassard became the secretary to Archbishop John Hughes, the head of the Roman Catholic Archdiocese of New York, serving in that capacity until Hughes' death in 1864. Afterwards, he wrote his first book, a biography of the late Archbishop, which was published in 1866.

Hassard was at the same time the assistant editor of the American Cyclopedia from 1857 to 1863, which brought him to the attention of the literary editor of the New York Tribune, George Ripley, who hired Hassard to fill in for him temporarily while he was in Europe. Hassard was briefly the first editor of Catholic World, but left that position for Chicago, where he edited Charles A. Dana's newspaper, the Chicago Republican. After its closure in 1867, he returned permanently to the New York Tribune, where he spent the remainder of his career.

Hassard succeeded Ripley as literary editor of the Tribune, in which capacity he wrote many book reviews, and was the music critic until 1883. He was also the managing editor of the newspaper for a time after the death of Horace Greeley in 1872. In that position, he wrote a short history of newspaper printing presses. In his history of the newspaper, Harry William Baehr characterized him as "[a] lank-built man with sandy hair and side whiskers, [who] possessed real charm of style and breadth of culture".

As music critic of the Tribune, Hassan was a Wagnerite; he wrote dispatches from the Wagner festival at Bayreuth, which were republished as a book on the first performance of The Ring.

Beside the biography of Archbishop Hughes, Hassard wrote a life of Pope Pius IX, as well as a History of the United States for use in Catholic schools. His 1881 book A Pickwickian Pilgrimage is based on his letters to the newspaper from England, in which he followed as faithfully as possible the places of Charles Dickens' The Pickwick Papers.

== Death ==
Hassard died at his home on East 18th Street in Manhattan of consumption on April 18, 1888, after nine years of illness. He had attempted to cure himself by spending time in England, the West Indies, the South of France, Southern California, and especially the Adirondacks at Saranac Lake, but it was not apparent that he was seriously ill until shortly before he died. A number of sources attribute the breakdown of his health to the strain of attempting to decipher coded telegrams between the Democratic Party and their operatives in the Southern states during the 1876 presidential election. Hassard was able to decode them with Colonel William M. Grosvenor, prompting a Congressional investigation into whether electoral votes had been purchased.

Hassard was eulogized as being a "gentleman and a scholar" and an "unselfish, gentle, pure spirit" whose work was full of "gentleness, dignity and sweetness," but who could be aroused by "racial bigotry and prejudice."
