= Spur (architecture) =

Architectural ornament

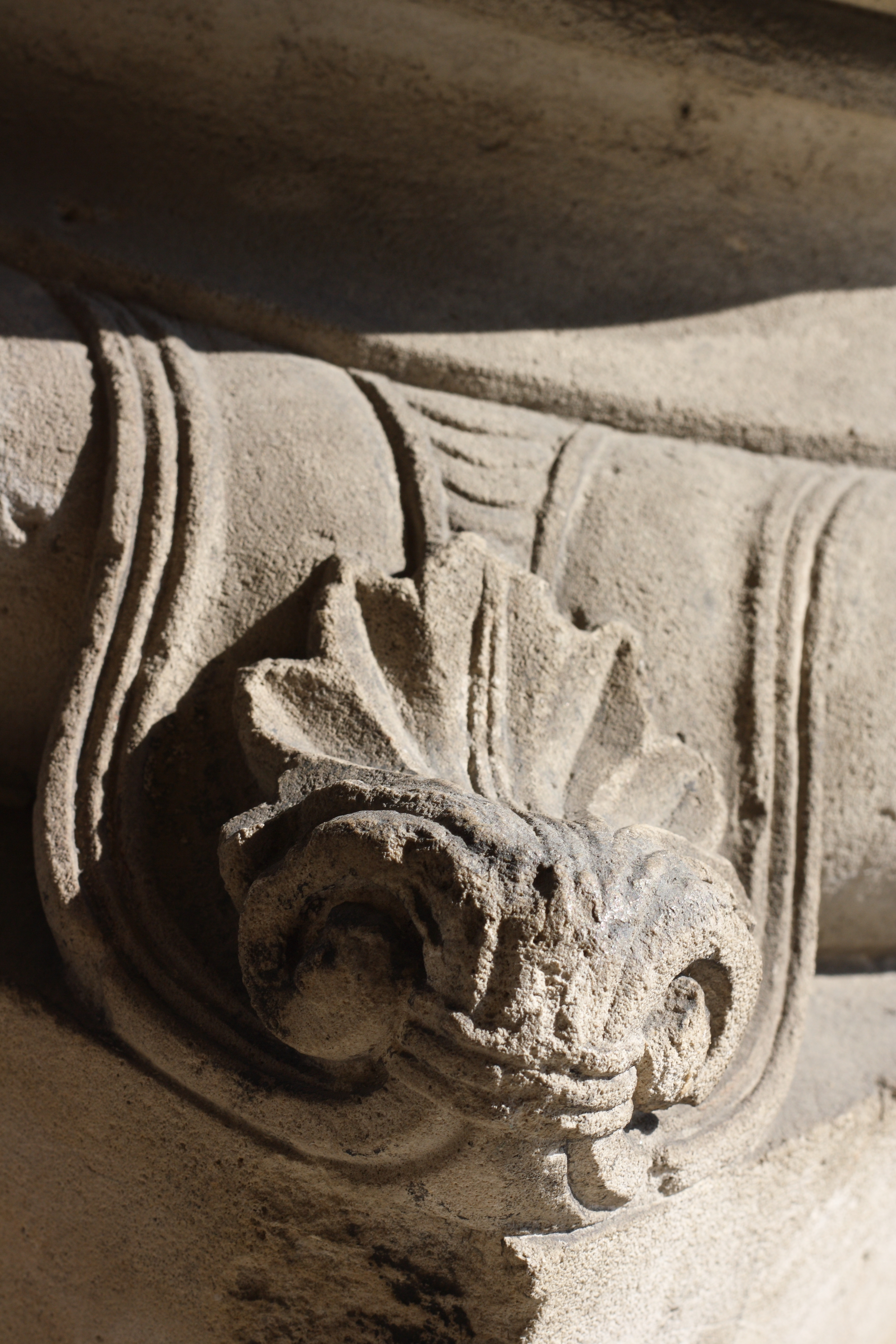
Spur on column base, Basilica Saint-Denys, France

In architecture, a spur (French griffe, German Eckblatt) is the ornament carved on the angles of the base of early columns.

== Ornament ==
A spur consists of a projecting claw, which, emerging from the lower torus of the base, rests on the projecting angle of the square plinth.

== Ancient Roman architecture ==
It is possible to these that Pliny refers (Hist. Nat. XXVI. 42) when speaking of the lizard and frog carved on the bases (spirae) of the columns of the temples of Jupiter and Juno in the Portico of Octavius; The earliest known example is that of Diocletian's Palace at Split.

In Romanesque work the oldest examples are those found on the bases in crypts, where they assumed various conventional forms; being, however, close to the eye, the spur soon developed into an elaborate leaf ornament, which in French 13th-century work and in the early English period is of great beauty; sometimes the spur takes the form of a fabulous animal, such as a griffin.

== Gallery ==
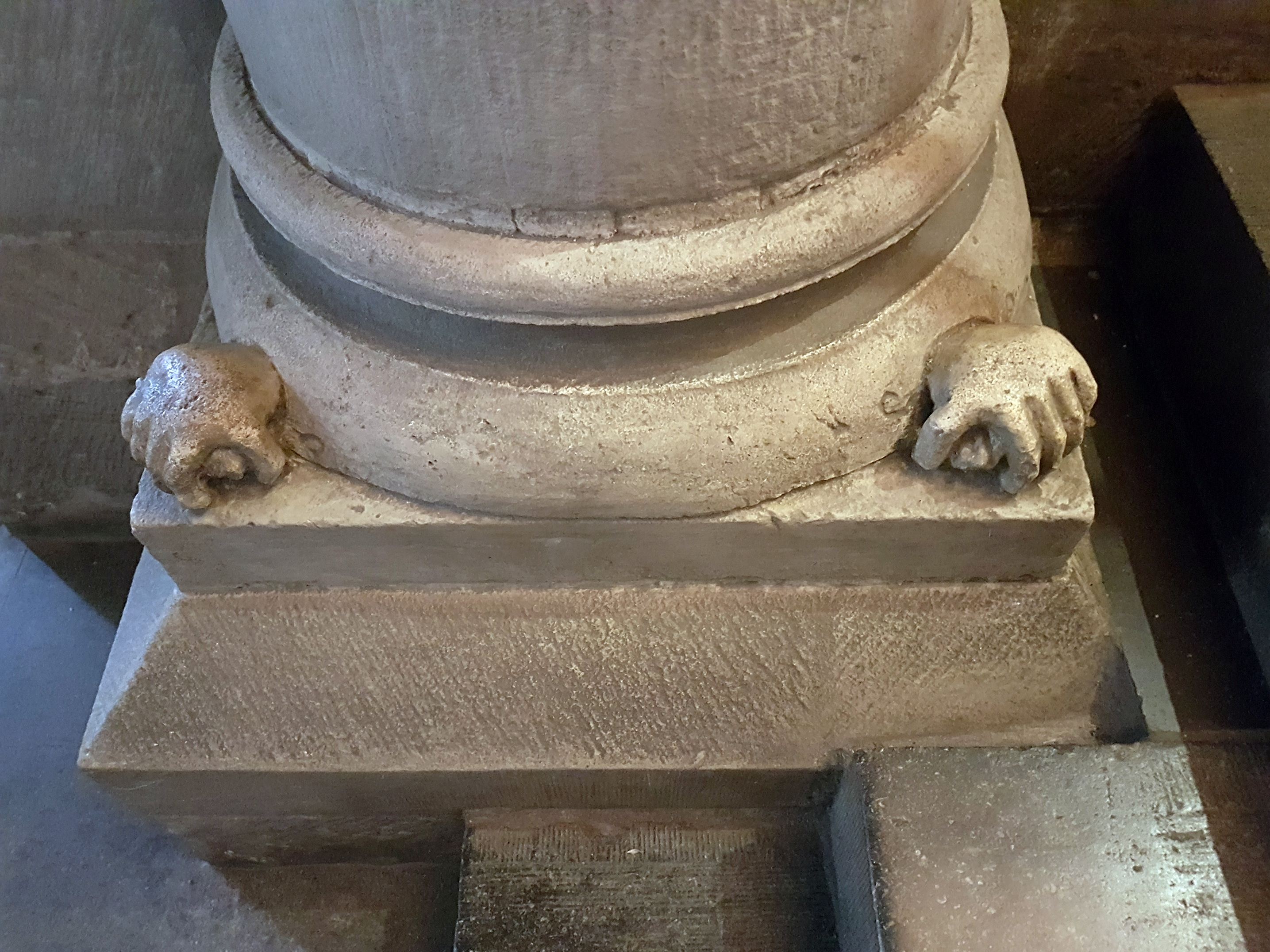
Romanesque hand-shaped spurs in the Trier Cathedral, Trier, Germany, unknown architect or sculptor, 12th-13th centuries

== See also ==
- Architectural sculpture
