= Thomas Dudley Fosbroke =

British antiquarian (1770–1842)

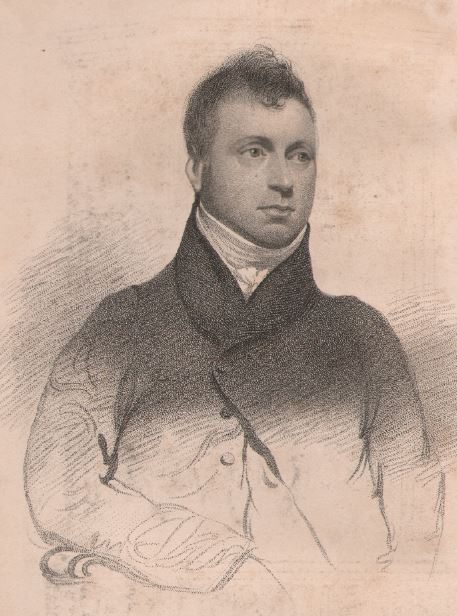
- Born: 27 May 1770
- Died: 1 January 1842 (aged 71)

Thomas Dudley Fosbroke (sometime Fosbrooke) FSA (27 May 1770 – 1 January 1842) was an English clergyman and antiquary. He was curate of Horsley, Gloucestershire, until 1810 and then of Walford in Herefordshire. He wrote British Monachism (2 volumes, 1802), an examination of English monastic life, as well as the Encyclopaedia of Antiquities (1824) and its sequel, Foreign Topography (1828). He was an important historian of Gloucester, writing two volumes on the history of that city.

== Early life and education ==
Fosbroke was born in London on 27 May 1770. He was educated at John Roysse's Free School in Abingdon, (now Abingdon School), and St Paul's School. He matriculated at Pembroke College, Oxford in 1785, graduating BA in 1789 and MA in 1792.

== Career ==
In 1792 he was ordained and became curate of Horsley, Gloucestershire, where he remained till 1810. He then removed to Walford in Herefordshire, and remained there the rest of his life, as curate until 1830, and afterwards as vicar.

In 1799 he was elected a fellow of the Society of Antiquaries. His first important work, British Monachism (2 volumes, 1802), was a compilation, from manuscripts in the British Museum and Bodleian libraries, of facts relating to English monastic life. The work for which he is best remembered, the Encyclopaedia of Antiquities, appeared in 1824. A sequel to this, Foreign Topography, was published in 1828.

== Death ==
Fosbroke died on 1 January 1842.

== Selected publications ==
- British Monachism, or, Manners and Customs of the Monks and Nuns of England. 1802.
- Abstracts of Records and Manuscripts Respecting the County of Gloucester. 1807. (Vol. 1, Vol. 2)
- An Original History of the City of Gloucester. John Nichols, London, 1819.
- Encyclopaedia of Antiquities. 1825 (2nd ed. 1840).

== References and sources ==
Attribution:
