= Godric of Mappestone =

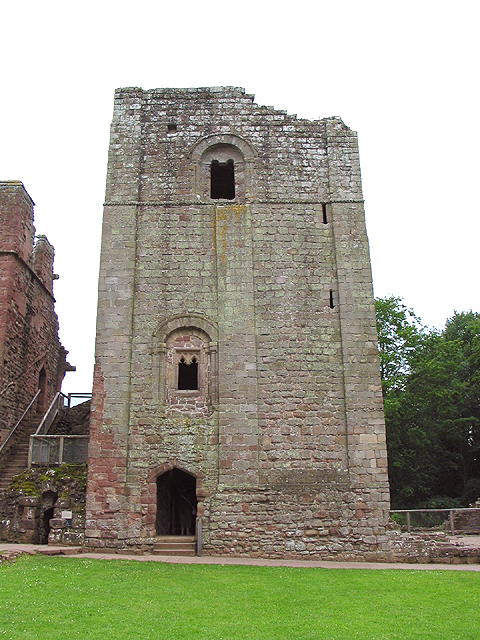
The Great Keep at Goodrich Castle, which stands on the spot of Godric of Mappestone's original earth and timber fortification on the site.

Godric of Mappestone was an Anglo-Saxon thane and landowner mentioned in the Domesday Book of 1086 as a tenant of Howel in modern Herefordshire. Godric is best known for the construction of the first timber version of Goodrich Castle, probably during the late 1080s, when it was originally known as Castellum Godrici, or "the castle of Godric", which gave the village of Goodrich its name. Victorian historians, however, believed the castle to date back further to the pre-Norman conquest days of King Canute, and the site may have been among a small number of Saxon fortifications along the Welsh border.

== Bibliography ==
- Brayley, Edward William and William Tombleson. (1823) A Series of Views of the Most Interesting Remains of Ancient Castles of England and Wales. London: Longman.
- Hull, Lise and Stephen Whitehorne. (2008) Great Castles of Britain & Ireland. London: New Holland Publishers.
- Pettifer, Adrian. (1995) English Castles: A Guide by Counties. Woodbridge: Boydell Press.
- Wright, Thomas. (1852) The history of Ludlow and its neighbourhood: forming a popular sketch of the history of the Welsh border. London: Longman.
