= Samuel Rush Meyrick =

English collector and scholar of arms and armour

Portrait by Henry Perronet Briggs, 1829

Sir Samuel Rush Meyrick, KH (16 August 1783 – 2 April 1848) was an English collector and scholar of arms and armour. He lived at Goodrich Court, Goodrich, Herefordshire, and introduced systematic principles to the study of his subject.

== Life ==
Meyrick was born in 1783 to John and Hannah Meyrick. His father had been an officer in the Honourable Artillery Company and a Fellow of the Society of Antiquaries. He was educated at Queen's College, Oxford, graduating with a BA in 1804, with a MA/Bachelor of Civil Law (BCL) in 1810 and finally with a Doctor in Civil Law (DCL) in 1811. He practiced as an advocate in ecclesiastical and admiralty courts.

In 1803 Samuel eloped to Wales with Mary Parry against the wishes of his parents. He was cut out of his father's will and forced to live on a small allowance. When his father died in 1805 he left his estate to Samuel's son Llewellyn.

Samuel did inherit from his father his passion for collecting antiquities including arms and armour, and was himself elected a Fellow of the Society of Antiquaries in 1810. In the same year he published the History and Antiquities of the County of Cardigan. After the death of his wife in 1818 he concentrated on developing his collection by a series of acquisitions of other collections. He was at one time owner of some locks of beard hair cut from the severed head of Charles I of England after his exhumation in 1813 during the reign of George III.

In 1824 he published his great work, the 3-volume A Critical Enquiry into Antient Armour as it existed in Europe, but particularly in England, from the Norman Conquest to the Reign of King Charles II, with a Glossary of Military Terms of the Middle Ages. The book was illustrated in colour with Meyrick's own paintings, was beautifully gilded, and solidified his reputation as an authority in the study of arms and armour. With the publication of this book Meyrick hoped to rectify historical inaccuracies in the displays of armour in the Tower of London and other collections. A contemporary review of his book in the Edinburgh Review described the illustrations as "Plates as fine as the monuments of Westminster Abbey. Really and truly the work is admirably executed, and deserves every eulogy".

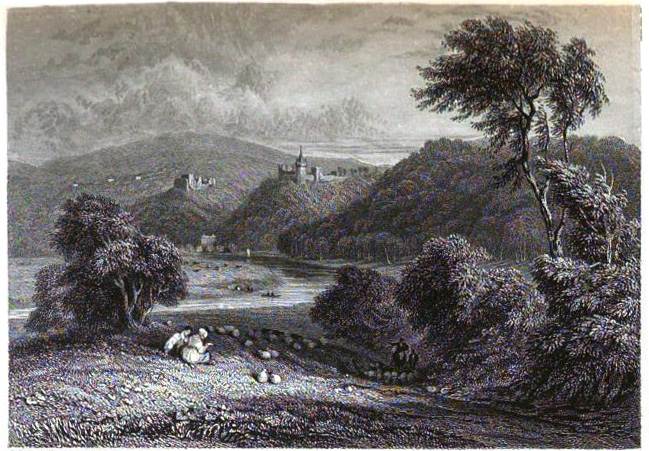
Goodrich Court and Goodrich Castle ruins

A number of his illustrations of armour are held in the Royal Academy of Arts collection in London. His collection was used by other artists as a source of inspiration for their own work and he hosted several artists at his home in London including Eugène Delacroix and Richard Parkes Bonington.

In 1828 he built Goodrich Court, having failed to acquire nearby Goodrich Castle. There the Meyrick collection was housed in a huge armoury. After helping to reorganise the collections at the Tower of London and Windsor Castle he was knighted in 1832. In 1834 he was appointed High Sheriff of Herefordshire. In 1837 Llewellyn died and Samuel inherited his estate, providing the funds for yet more collection building.

== Legacy ==
After Meyrick's death in 1848, Goodrich Court and the Meyrick collection passed to his cousin Augustus Meyrick, who exhibited the collection in 1869 at what is now the Victoria and Albert Museum. Augustus subsequently offered the collection to the British Government, and donated some objects to the British Museum, but ultimately disposed of much of it to various private purchasers. Many important items were acquired by the antiquarian, Augustus Wollaston Franks, who later donated these too to the British Museum. Other significant pieces from the collection were bought by a Parisian dealer named Frédéric Spitzer and sold to Sir Richard Wallace and are now held in the Wallace Collection in London.

Tobias Capwell, the curator of arms and armour at the Wallace Collection acknowledged Meyrick's contribution to the study of arms and armour by describing him as "The first and greatest of those giants on whose shoulders we stand."

== Works ==
- The Costume of the Original Inhabitants of the British Islands (1810)
- The History and Antiquities of the County of Cardigan (1810) at Forebears
- A Critical Inquiry into Antient Armour (1824)
- Specimens of Ancient Furniture (1836) at Google Books
- Heraldic Visitations of Wales and Part of the Marches (1846) at Google Books

== Collection ==
Meyrick's collection of arms and armour included the following pieces:

- Meyrick Helmet
- Witham Shield
