= Goodrich Court =

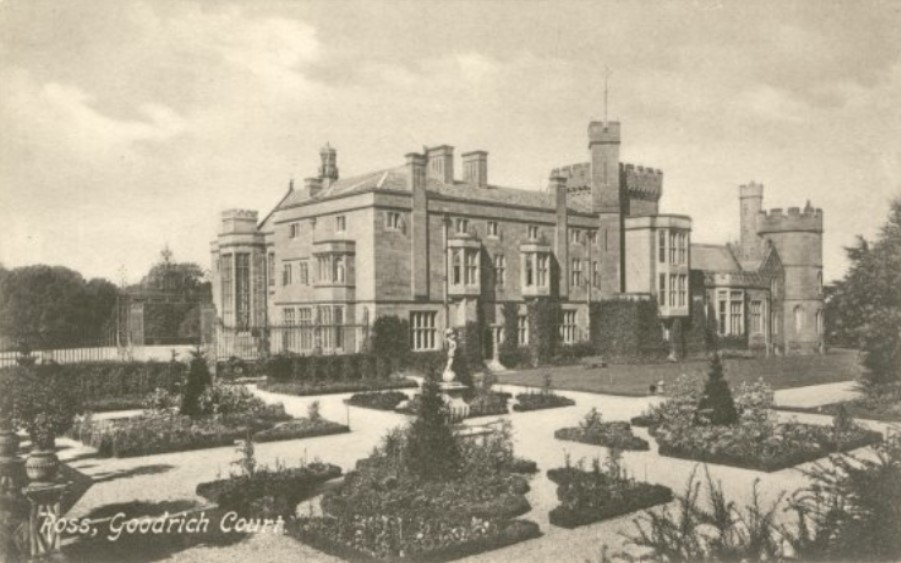
- The court in the mid 19th century

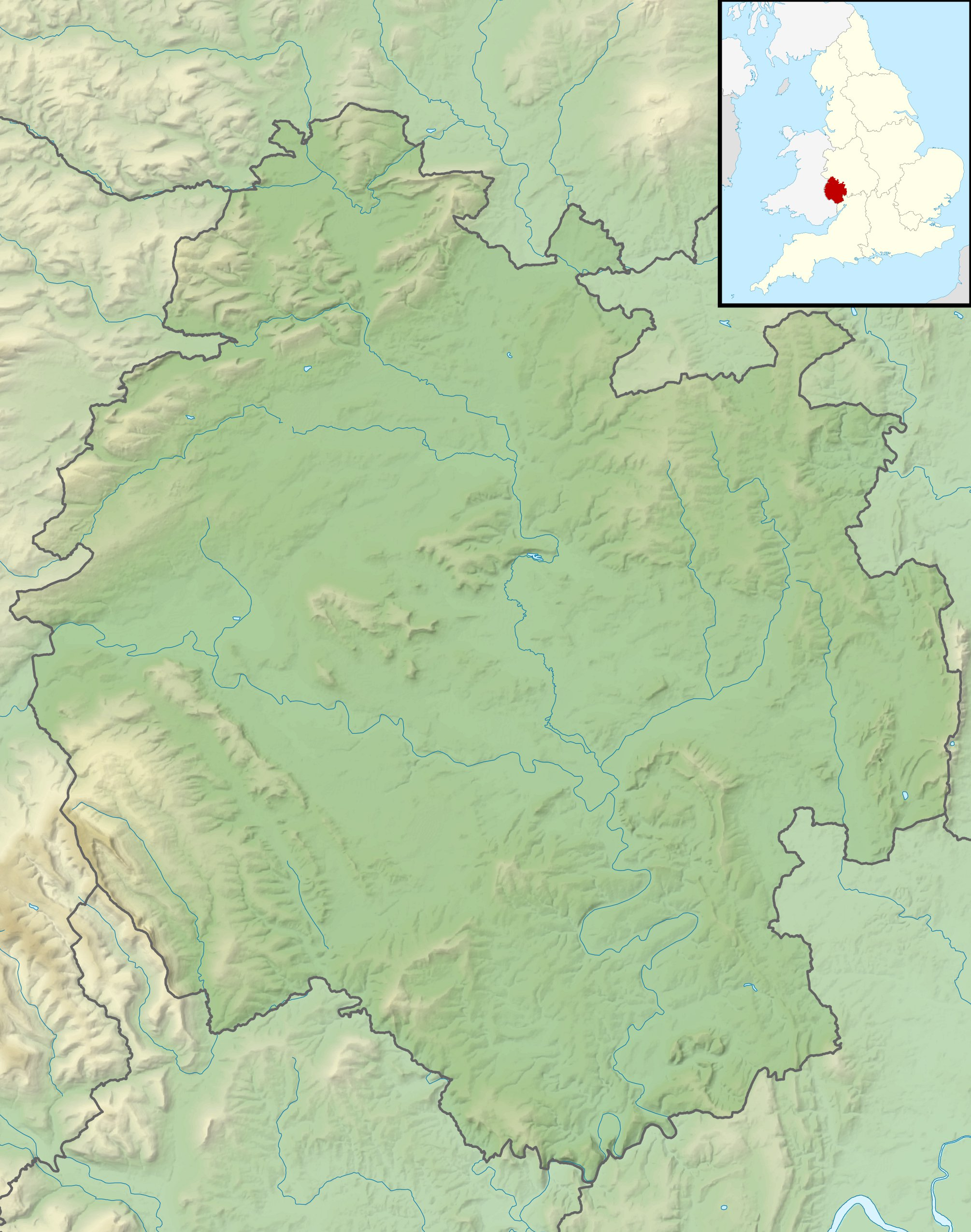
- Location within Herefordshire
- 51.8814°N 2.6314°W
- Type: Castle
- Location: Goodrich, Herefordshire

History
- Built: 1828
- Demolished: 1949

Site notes
- Architect: Edward Blore
- Architectural style: Gothic Revival

Goodrich Court, Goodrich, Herefordshire, England was a 19th-century, neo-gothic mock castle built by the antiquarian Sir Samuel Rush Meyrick in 1828. Designed by the architect Edward Blore, the court is described by Pevsner as a "fantastic and enormous tower-bedecked house." The court's situation, on a hilltop facing Goodrich Castle, so offended the poet William Wordsworth that he wished "to blow away Sir Samuel Meyrick's impertinent structure and all the possessions it contained."

Meyrick built the court to house his very significant collection of armour and antiquities, much of which subsequently passed to the British Museum and to the Wallace Collection. In the years following its construction, Meyrick's house and its collections became a notable element of the Wye Tour.

Meyrick's son predeceased him and after Meyrick's death, the court passed through a number of hands, housing pupils from Felsted School during the Second World War. When the school left, the building was stripped of its contents, furnishings and fixtures, and completely demolished in 1949–50. Today, apart from a small lodge and the stables, the only significant remainder is the Monmouth Gatehouse, which stands on the Monmouth to Ross-on-Wye Road.

== History ==
Samuel Meyrick was an antiquarian with an interest in Welsh history who claimed, incorrectly, to be related to the Welsh prince Owain Gwynedd. Meyrick originally intended to buy and restore a genuine Marches castle as his ancestral home, but was unable to acquire one. He explored the possibility of buying Goodrich Castle after a visit in 1823; "the very thing to suit us, so exactly that it seems to have been made on purpose"; but was unable to complete negotiations. Instead he decided to build his own new castle alongside the ruined castle which he named Goodrich Court. Architectural historian Nikolaus Pevsner called it a "fantastic and enormous castellated tower-bedecked house", whilst its siting, directly opposite the genuine Norman castle, a positioning which foreshadowed that of Peckforton Castle and Beeston Castle, caused William Wordsworth to condemn it as "impertinent".

After Meyrick's death in 1848, Goodrich Court was bought by George Moffatt, a Liberal party Member of Parliament. The Moffatts extended the castle, including building new stables in the same style as the original property. During the Second World War the castle was used by Felsted School, which was evacuated from Essex to the area. The broadcaster Kenneth Kendall recalled life at the court during the evacuation; "The house was furnished with amazing furniture and paintings (with) armour everywhere. I remember one boy got stuck inside a Jacobean helmet and had to be rescued by the headmaster." When the school relocated at the end of the war the court was stripped of its fittings in 1946 and demolished in 1949. The Monmouth Gate, on the road to Ross-on-Wye, is the only significant surviving remnant of the court.

== Architecture ==
Designed by the Gothic Revival architect Edward Blore to Meyrick's instructions, Goodrich Court was built of local red sandstone in the neo-gothic style, and although based on the Edwardian architecture seen at Goodrich Castle, to some it more resembled a French château. Enjoying a gatehouse, portcullis, battlements, a moat and towers, it was also noted for the Armoury, a large hall which contained Meyrick's collection of armour. Many of the details of the castle utilised the heraldic symbols of Alymer de Valence, a medieval lord at Goodrich Castle in the early 14th century.

The Monmouth Gate, which remains intact, is described by Pevsner as of "red stone with round towers and machicoulis." It is a Grade II listed building.

== Gallery ==
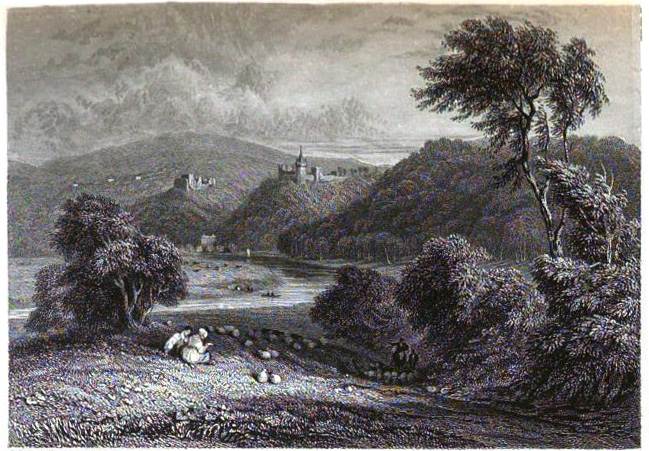
A Victorian engraving of Goodrich Court, with the court in the centre and Goodrich Castle centre-left

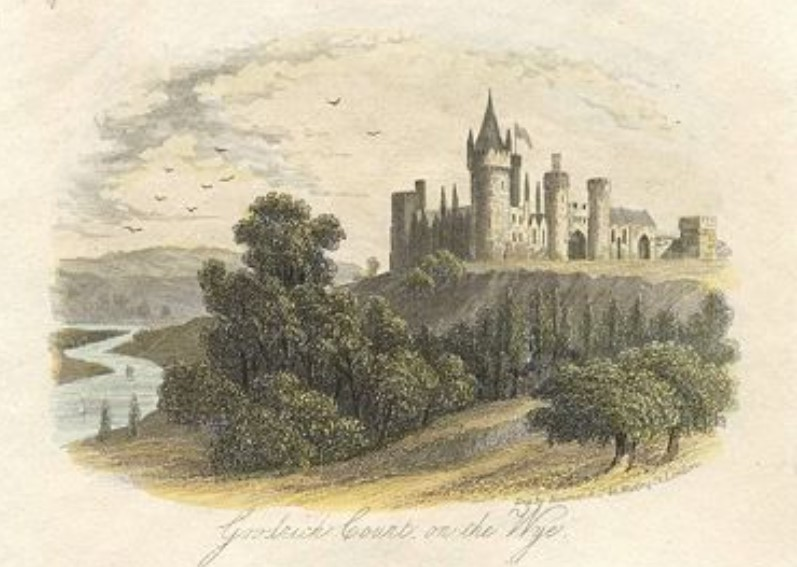
Another Victorian illustration

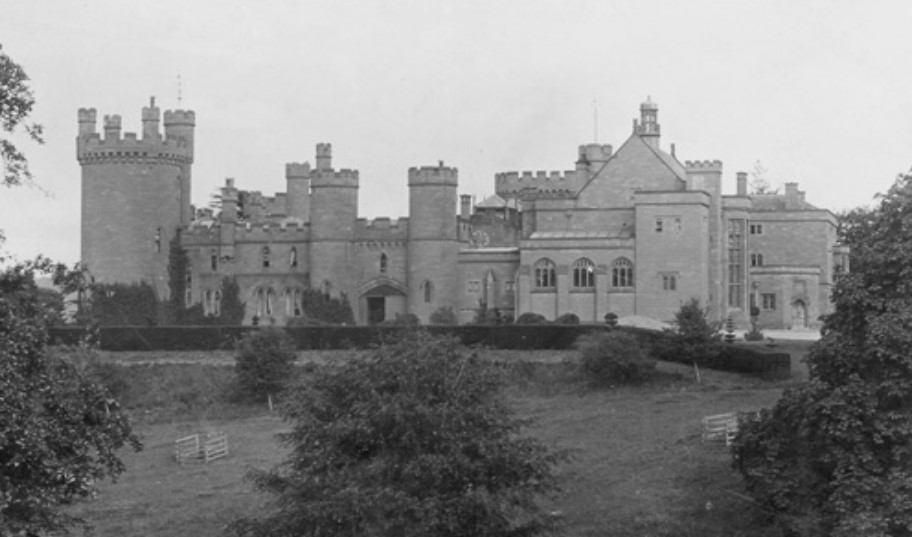
A view of the court, c.1860

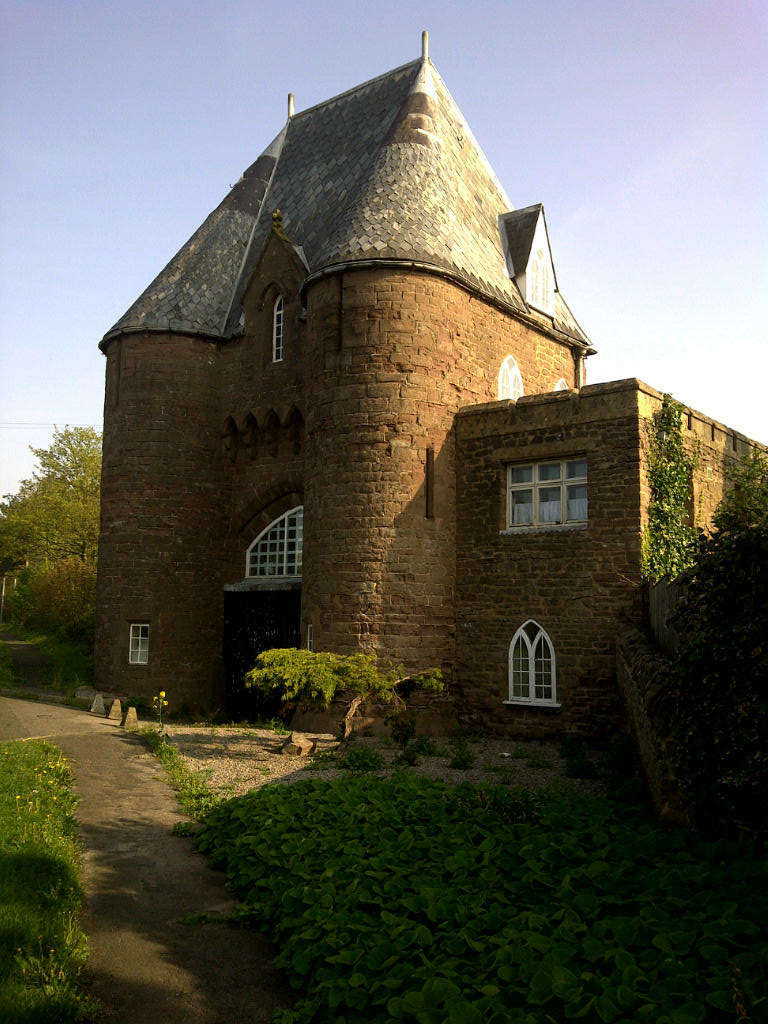
The Monmouth Gate: The main surviving fragment of Goodrich Court
