= Dinefwr =

Dinefwr (also written Dynefwr and anglicised as Dynevor) may refer to:

== Places ==
- District of Dinefwr, a local government district of Dyfed, Wales, from 1974 to 1996
- Carmarthen East and Dinefwr (UK Parliament constituency), created in 1997
- Carmarthen East and Dinefwr (Assembly constituency), created in 1999
- Dinefwr Castle, a Welsh castle near Llandeilo, Carmarthenshire
- Dinefwr Park National Nature Reserve
- Plas Dinefwr, a country house now called Newton House, Llandeilo

== People ==
- Baron Dynevor
- House of Dinefwr, a royal house of Wales
