= George Rice (died 1779) =

British politician (1724–1779)

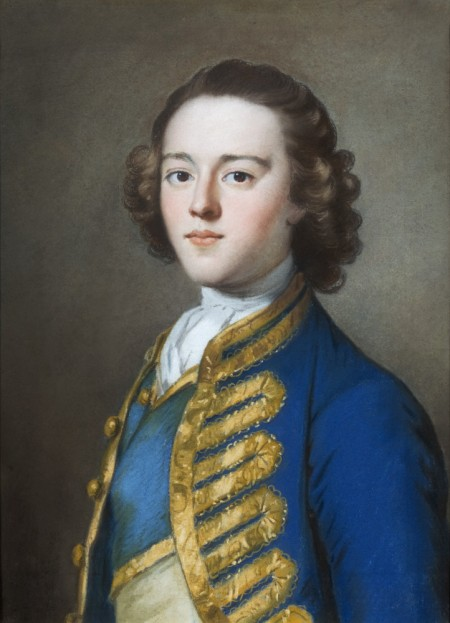
- Portrait of Rice by William Hoare

Member of the Great Britain Parliament for Carmarthenshire
- In office 1754–1779

Lord Lieutenant of Carmarthenshire
- In office 1755–1779

Personal details
- Born: 1724
- Died: 1779 (aged 54–55)
- Party: Whig
- Spouse: Cecil Talbot (m. 1756)
- Children: 4, including George and Edward

George Rice (1724 – 3 August 1779) was a Welsh politician and courtier. He became Vice-Admiral of Carmarthen, Lord Lieutenant of Carmarthenshire, and Lord Commissioner of the board of trade under the Duke of Newcastle.

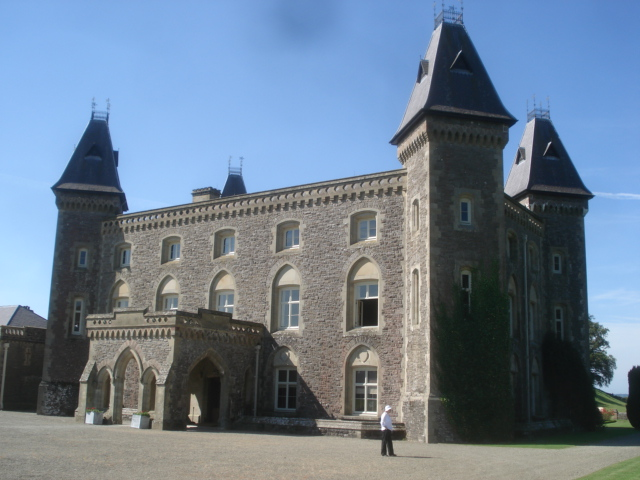
Newton House

== Life ==
He was the only son of Edward Rice of Newton House, Llandeilo, Carmarthenshire, M.P. for the county in 1722, by Lucy, daughter of John Morley Trevor of Glynde, Sussex. He matriculated at Christ Church, Oxford on 26 January 1742, at the age of 17, but took no degree. He succeeded his grandfather Griffith Rice, MP in 1728, his father having previously died in 1727, inheriting Newton House and the Dynefwr Estate near Llandeilo, Carmarthenshire.

Rice devoted himself to politics and local affairs. A Whig, he associated himself with the group led by Griffith Philipps of Cwmgwili. At the general election of 1754 he was returned for Carmarthenshire after a warm contest with Sir Thomas Stepney, 7th Baronet, and retained his seat, over a period of twenty-five years, until his death, being re-elected four times without opposition. He was made Vice-Admiral of Carmarthen in April 1755, Lord Lieutenant of Carmarthenshire in May 1755 (reappointed 23 June 1761), and, when the Carmarthenshire Militia was embodied (7 December 1759), he was nominated Colonel of the regiment.

Rice became Chamberlain of Brecon and of Breconshire, Glamorgan, and Radnorshire in 1765, and was sworn in as Mayor of Carmarthen on 5 June 1767. By his marriage, on 16 August 1756, with Cecil (1733–1793), daughter of William Talbot, 2nd Baron Talbot of Hensol, Lord Steward, he increased his political influence, and on 21 March 1761 he accepted office under the Duke of Newcastle as a Lord Commissioner of the board of trade and foreign plantations, with a salary of £1,000 a year. This post he held in successive ministries until April 1770, when Lord North selected him for the court appointment of Treasurer of the Chamber, and he was sworn a member of the Privy Council on 4 May following.

In the late 1700s, George Rice and his wife Cecil began the construction of a landscape garden at Newton House, hiring eminent architect Capability Brown in 1775 to assume responsibility for the development. He also added turrets and battlements between 1760 and 1780 to give the property a more romantic appearance.

Rice died in office, on 3 August 1779, at the age of 55, and was succeeded by his son George Rice, 3rd Baron Dynevor.

== Family ==
Rice's widow Cecil became a peeress in her own right as Baroness Dynevor on her father's death on 27 April 1782, and died 14 March 1793, leaving two daughters and two sons: George Rice, 3rd Baron Dynevor (1765–1852); and Edward Rice (died 1867), Dean of Gloucester, whose son was Francis William Rice, 5th Baron Dynevor.

Parliament of Great Britain
Preceded by John Vaughan I	Member of Parliament for Carmarthenshire; 1754 – 1779	Succeeded by John Vaughan II
