= Edward Rice (priest) =

Edward Rice (19 November 1779 – 15 August 1862) was Dean of Gloucester from 1825 until his death.

The second son of the Welsh politician George Rice and his wife the Cecil de Cardonnel, 2nd Baroness Dynevor, he was educated at Christ Church, Oxford. In 1800 he married Charlotte Lascelles, the illegitimate daughter of General Francis Lascelles and singer Ann Catley. Their second son was Francis William Rice, 5th Baron Dynevor. He was Precentor of York Minster from 1802, and Prebend of Driffield until his death; and held the living at Great Rissington from 1810 to 1856 when he passed it to his eldest son, Henry.

== Notes ==
Church of England titles
Preceded by John Plumptre	Dean of Gloucester; 1825–1862	Succeeded by Henry Law
