= John Plumptre =

John Plumptre may refer to:

- John Plumptre (elder) (1679–1751), MP for Nottingham
- John Plumptre (younger) (1711–1791), MP for Nottingham
- John Pemberton Plumptre (1791–1864), MP for East Kent
- John Plumptre (priest) (1754 - 1825), Anglican priest and Dean of Gloucester
