= George Rice, 3rd Baron Dynevor =

British peer and politician (1765–1852)

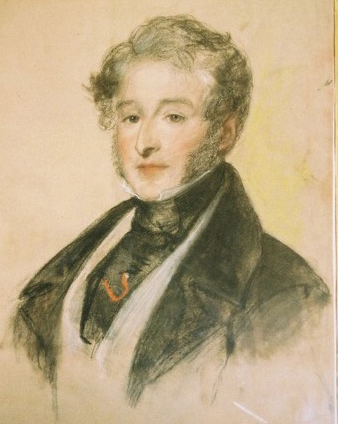
George Talbot Rice, 3rd Baron Dynevor, Lord Dynevor.

George Talbot Rice, 3rd Baron Dynevor (Dinefwr) (8 October 1765 – 9 April 1852) was a British peer and politician. He was the son of Cecil de Cardonnel, 2nd Baroness Dynevor and George Rice (or Rhys). He was educated at Westminster School and matriculated at Christ Church, Oxford on 1 February 1783, where he was awarded a Master of Arts degree on 30 May 1786.

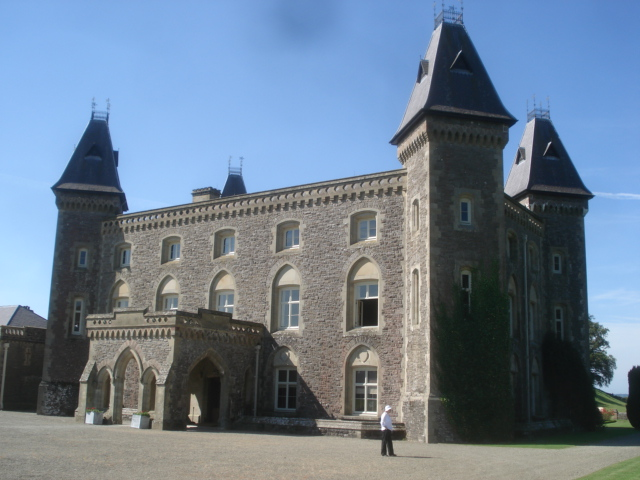
Newton House, Dynefwr

Talbot Rice was the Tory Member of Parliament for Carmarthenshire from 1790 to 1793. His father had previously been the Tory MP for Carmarthenshire between 1754 and 1779.

He inherited his title in 1793 on the death of his mother. The 3rd Baron's mother had adopted, by royal licence the name of de Cardonnel. In 1817 (again by royal licence) he resumed his paternal surname of Rice. His name is now often hyphenated as Talbot-Rice.

He died on 9 April 1852. On 20 October 1794 he had married Frances Townshend, third daughter of Thomas Townshend, 1st Viscount Sydney of St Leonards. They had 2 sons and 5 daughters and lived at Newton House in his Dynefwr estate near Llandeilo, Carmarthenshire. He was succeeded by his eldest son George, who later adopted the surname of Rice-Trevor.

Coat of arms of George Rice, 3rd Baron Dynevor
Crest A raven Sable. Escutcheon Argent a chevron between three ravens Sable. Supporters Dexter a griffin per fess Or and Argent wings addorsed and inverted tail between the legs, sinister a talbot Argent collared flory counterflory Gules ears Ermine and charged on the shoulder with a trefoil slipped Vert. Motto Secret Et Hardi (Secret And Bold))

Parliament of Great Britain
Preceded by Sir William Mansel	Member of Parliament for Carmarthenshire; 1790–1793	Succeeded by James Hamlyn
Honorary titles
Preceded by John Vaughan	Lord Lieutenant of Carmarthenshire; 1804–1852	Succeeded by The Earl Cawdor
Peerage of Great Britain
Preceded by Cecil de Cardonnel	Baron Dynevor; 1793–1852	Succeeded by George Rice
