= Newton House, Llandeilo =

Grade II listed country house in Wales

Newton House
- Plas Dinefwr
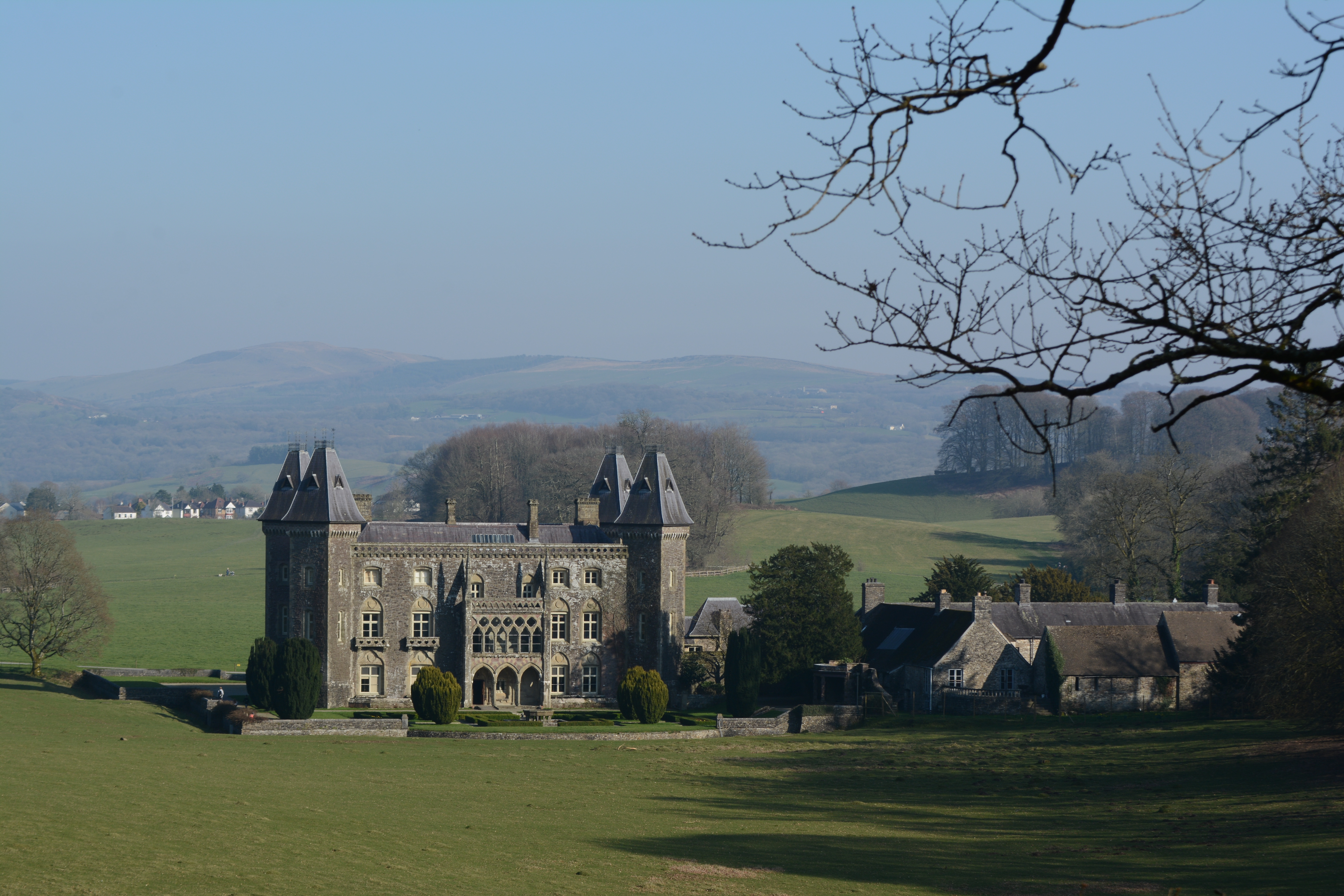

- Location within Wales
- 51.8841°N 4.0147°W
- Type: House
- Location: Llandeilo, Carmarthenshire

History
- Built: 1660
- Rebuilt: 1850

Site notes
- Architectural style: Victorian gothic
- Owner: National Trust, Davies Family

Listed Building – Grade II*
- Official name: Plas Dinefwr
- Designated: 1966
- Reference no.: 11098

Newton House is a Grade II* listed country house situated just to the west of the market town of Llandeilo in Carmarthenshire, Wales. It is partially owned and maintained by the National Trust and lies within Dinefwr Park (sometimes anglicised as "Dynevor") and the grounds of Dinefwr Castle. The park and gardens are listed on the Cadw/ICOMOS Register of Parks and Gardens of Special Historic Interest in Wales. The original house was built during the Medieval period on a site which has been occupied for at least two millennia. The current house was built by Edward Rice in the Jacobean style in 1660, though extensive changes were made in the 1850s in the Venetian Gothic style. The house played a role in the Rebecca Riots of 1843, when the occupant of the house at the time, Colonel George Rice-Trevor, 4th Baron Dynevor, received a death threat with an empty grave dug in the ground. After 1956 the property fell into turbulent times when two owners died within the space of a few years. It was sold in 1974, and later fell into disrepair; it was occupied by squatters and thieves who removed beams and furniture.

The house, along with Dinefwr Castle, have since been restored by the National Trust and Cadw respectively. It is a three-storey castellated structure, built from grey stone, with four tall towers in each corner, with sloping slate roofs. The front features a grand central porch. Two rooms are open to the public, including a tearoom and exhibition in the basement and ground floor which contain numerous displays related to the history of the estate and occupants. The deer park which surrounds the property was landscaped by Capability Brown in 1775. The surrounding woodland consists mainly of oak and wych elm. Newton House is cited as one of the most haunted houses in Wales, noted in particular for its ghost of Walter the Butler, a former employee whose tobacco smoke purportedly wafts through the air.

== History ==
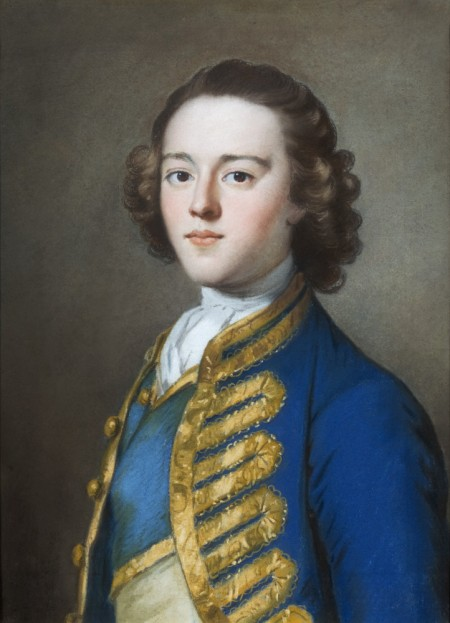
George Rice

Dinefwr Park has a history of occupation spanning at least two millennia. A polished stone axe dated to the Neolithic period was unearthed on the site in 1976, and during the Iron Age, a farm existed on the property. The Romans later built a pair of forts here, with one partly overlying the other. There are traces of Roman roads and tracks, some of which may have been part of the Carmarthen–Llandovery Roman road. A Roman milestone and a Roman coin hoard were unearthed near Dinefwr Castle, and pieces of amphorae and Samian items have been excavated near Dinefwr Farm.

During the 12th century, Dinefwr Castle was built by Rhys ap Gruffydd, Prince of Wales. The castle and grounds were seized by Henry VIII in 1531, and the estate owners, who changed their family surname to Rice, subsequently had to buy back their property from the Crown. The family were elevated to the peerage of Great Britain as Baron Dynevor. Mary I is documented to have restored some of the land back to the Rhys family, but it was not until the reign of Charles I that the family fully regained their properties.

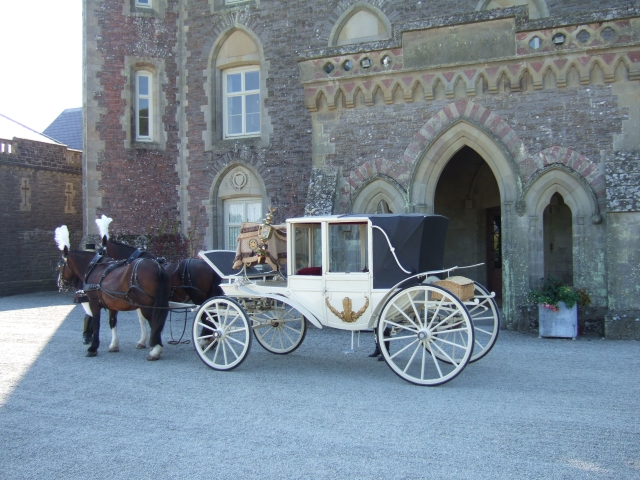
Carriage at Newton House

Newton House was originally built during the medieval period at some distance from the castle. It is documented to have been later modified in 1595 and 1603. The current Newton House was completed in 1660 under the command of Edward Rice. In the late 1700s, George Rice and his wife Cecil began the construction of a landscape garden, and hired eminent architect Capability Brown in 1775 to assume responsibility for the development. Turrets and battlements were added between 1760 and 1780, giving the property a more romanticised appearance. During the Rebecca Riots of 1843, Colonel George Rice was awoken one night in September and found an empty grave dug in the grounds, warning him that he would be buried in it by October 10.

Newton House fell into a turbulent period after the death of Walter Rice, 7th Baron Dynevor in 1956. His son Charles Rhys, 8th Baron Dynevor, died just six years later, and most of the estate and a number of family's assets had to be sold off to pay duties. In 1974, the property was sold by Richard Rhys, 9th Baron Dynevor, and later fell into disrepair: it was occupied by squatters and thieves who removed beams and furniture. The house, along with Dinefwr Castle, have since been restored by the National Trust and Cadw respectively. The National Trust acquired the deer park in 1987 and Newton House three years later.

== Architecture ==
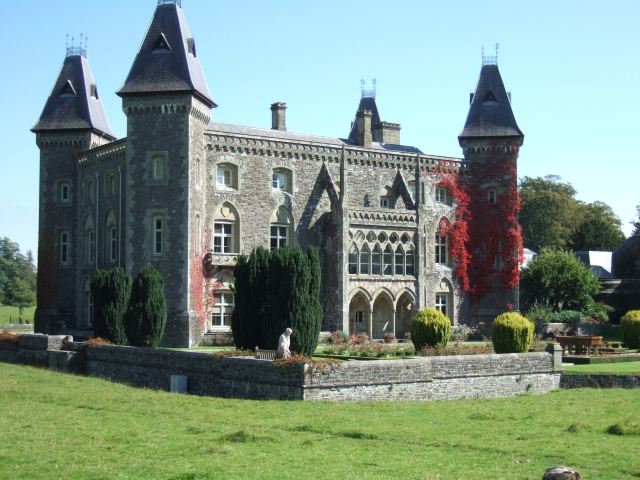
Newton House viewed from the west

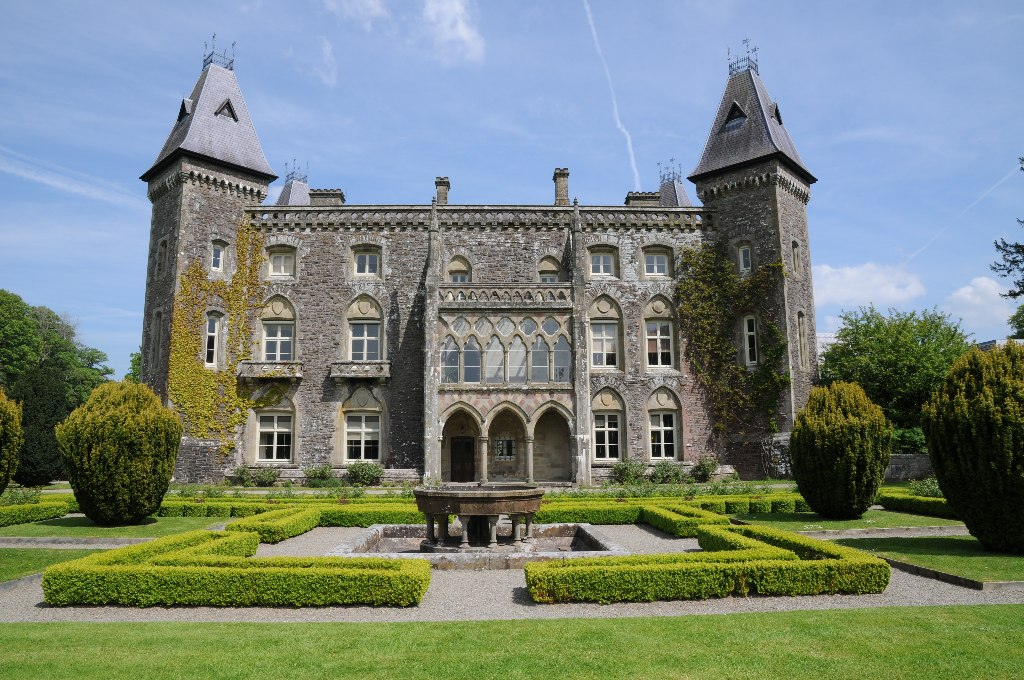
View of the House from the entrance

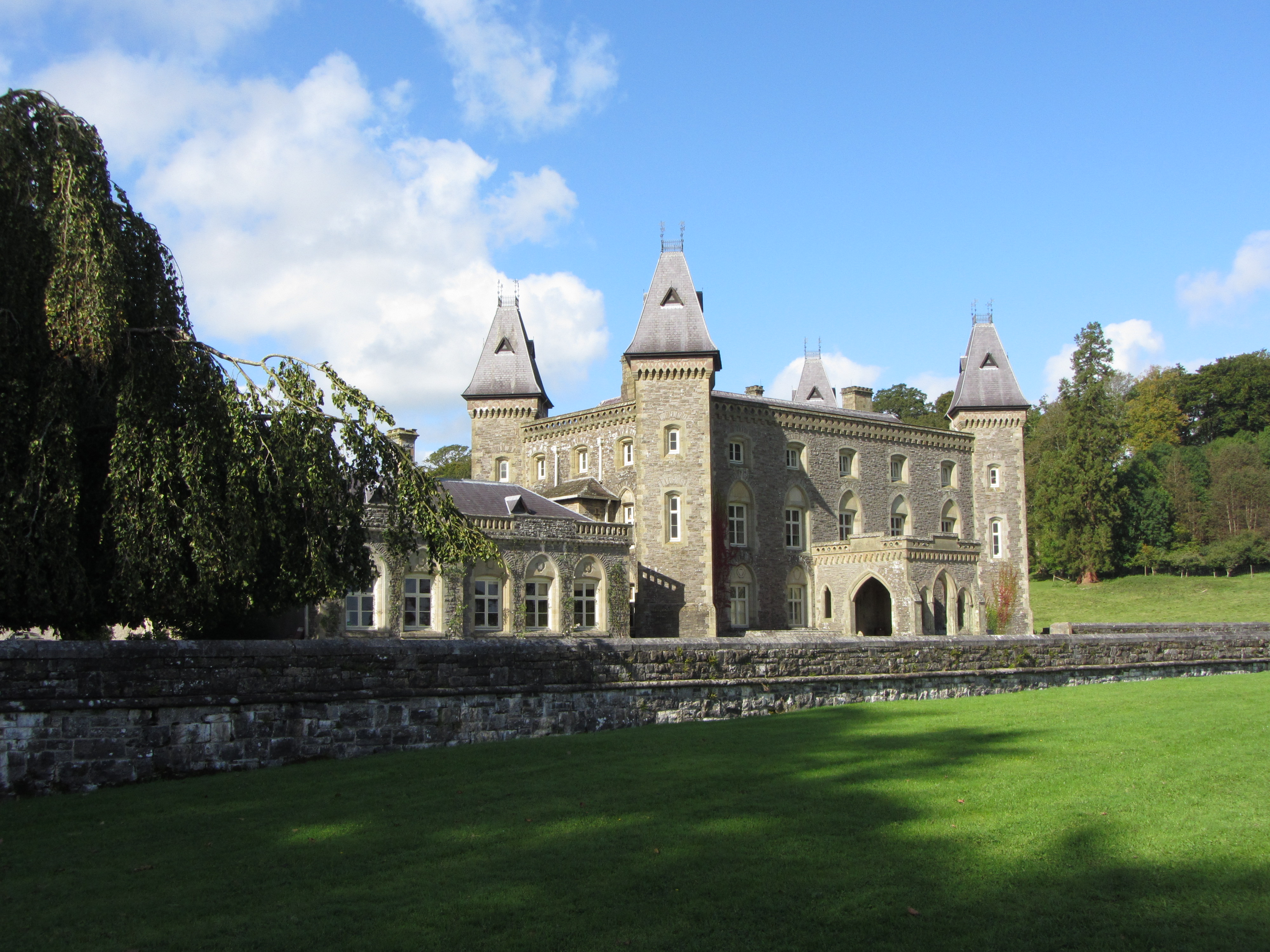
Newton House - Llandeilo, side view

Edward Rice ordered the construction of a Jacobean house on the site of an earlier medieval mansion in 1659, and it was completed the following year. Turrets and battlements were added between 1760 and 1780. Though the property remains Jacobean, around 1856, there were significant changes made in the Venetian Gothic style, which today emanate the ambience of the Victorian period. The tower was added, and alterations were made by R. K. Penson of Oswestry. The National Trust writes of it: "Most of what you see of the grand building today dates back to the 1850s, when it was given a fashionable Gothic facelift, with stone cladding and four impressive turrets". A limestone refacing occurred at the same time. Newton House is a Grade II* listed property, as are its summer house and the inner and outer courtyard ranges. The nearby dairy cottage, ha-ha, dovecote, fountain, deer abattoir, icehouse, home farmhouse, corn barn and byre/stable range are Grade II listed in their own right.

Newton House is a three-storey castellated structure, built from grey stone, with a tall tower in each corner, with sloping slate roofs. The front features a grand central porch. The authors of Carmarthenshire and Ceredigion consider the heavily decorated late 17th-century ceilings of the house to be "the finest single architectural legacy among the country houses of the region". As in Plas Taliaris and several other country houses in the county, the ceilings are panelled, with "thick moulded beams and wreaths in the panels and winged cherubs' heads in the corners". The entrance hall contains a columned Doric screen with a 19th-century ribbed and bossed ceiling. The old dining room to the right of this features a coffered ceiling dated to the 17th century, containing "low plaster relief mouldings including guilloché, acanthus and egg and dart". The chimney piece has been removed. The drawing room to rear of the property also features a richly adorned coffered ceiling with "frieze bearing rosette bands" and a "centre oval with bay leaf design". The 17th-century staircase features thick balusters and prominent finials, with foliage patterns ingrained in the plasterwork of the handrail. A billiard room was added to the house in 1896. A strongroom with 18-inch-thick (46 cm) walls and heavy steel fire-proof doors was added in 1914, for the Dynevors to keep their important documents and valuables. On the upper floors are rooms with 18th-century fittings, including "panelled dados, lugged architraves, low relief plaster ceilings and closets within angled turrets". The bedroom on the northeast of the house features a particularly detailed coffered ceiling with floral patterns.

The house contains several paintings of note, including William Powell Frith's Mary, Queen of Scots Bidding Farewell to France (1561) and Godfrey Kneller's portrait of the Bishop of Salisbury, William Talbot, dated to 1718. Two showrooms at the house are open to the public. Aside from the tearoom, the exhibition in the basement and ground floor contains numerous displays related to the Rhys family, the history of the estate and World War II, and is designed as if the year is 1912.

== Park and garden ==
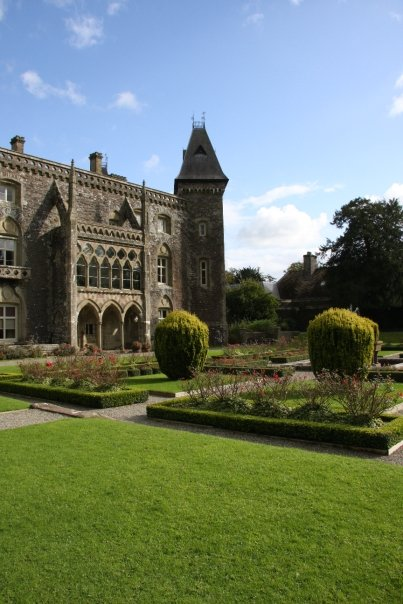
Part of the formal gardens at the house

The house is surrounded by a deer park which was landscaped from 1775, including a winding path through the park and planted deciduous trees in key places to frame the house and castle. The deer park contains notable herds of rare White Park cattle and fallow deer. A small garden behind the house, overlooking the deer park, Moorish in style with a central fountain, has been restored to its former glory. Brown's beech clumps survive in the present day. The park is registered at Grade I on the Cadw/ICOMOS Register of Parks and Gardens of Special Historic Interest in Wales.

Writing in 1862, Benjamin Clarje considered the park to exhibit "perhaps a richer display of varied landscape than any spot of similar size in the kingdom". He notes that the surface in the upper area of the park is "diversified by gentle undulations and has been planted with great judgment and taste" and that the River Towy flows in the vicinity. The Wildlife Trust West Wales acquired the nearby woodland in 1979.

The BBC's Peter Crawford wrote of it in his book, The Living Isles: "The woodland is primarily oak and wych elm," he writes. "The shrubs and ground cover are outstanding with cherry, holly, spindle, dog violet and the parasitic toothwort. Lichen communities are of importance and include the rare lungwort. Overlooked by the romantic Castle of Dinefwr the fine old parkland has a herd of fallow deer. The mature trees attract woodpecker, common redstarts and pied flycatchers. In winter, the water meadows draw large numbers of ducks".

== Haunting ==
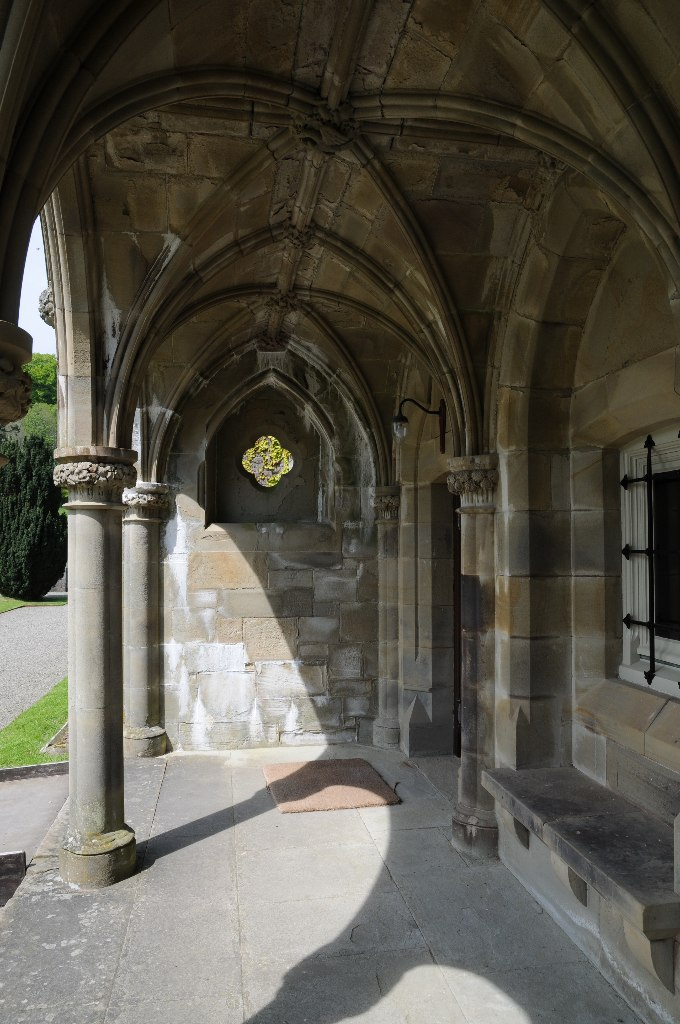
Vaulting

The National Trust states that Newton House is "thought to be one of the most haunted houses in Britain", and Wales Online cites it as one of the most notable ghostly houses of Wales. Over the years, many ghost sightings or paranormal activity have been allegedly witnessed at the house. The servants' basement is one of the purported centres of activity, with numerous sightings, particularly of a ghost known as Walter the Butler who worked at the house.

People have reported smelling his tobacco smoke in the room, muffled voices and lights eerily turning on and off on their own accord. Visitors have reported feeling as if they are being choked when walking up and down the cantilever staircase; this is believed to be related to the strangling of Lady Elinor Cavendish, the cousin of the lady of Newton House in the 1720s, by a lover whom she had rejected.

The alleged hauntings at the property began to be investigated by television journalists in the 1980s, and on one occasion crewmen mysteriously fell ill one after the other while shooting there. During one investigation, the spectre of a young, beautiful girl was said to have glided across the room and disappeared through the cupboard door. The house was later the subject of an investigation in the 11th and 15th series of the Most Haunted programme.

== See also ==
- List of National Trust properties in Wales
- Grade II* listed buildings in Carmarthenshire
- St Tyfi's Church, Llandyfeisant

== Sources ==
- Brown, Jane (3 March 2011). Lancelot 'Capability' Brown, 1716–1783: The Omnipotent Magician. Random House. ISBN 978-1-4090-1942-8.
- Clarke, Benjamin (1852). The British Gazetteer, Political, Commercial, Ecclesiastical, and Historical: Showing the Distances of Each Place from London and Derby—gentlemen's Seats—populations ... &c. Illustrated by a Full Set of County Maps, with All the Railways Accurately Laid Down ... (Public domain ed.). H.G. Collins.
- Grigg, Dr Russell (15 March 2015). Little Book of Carmarthenshire. History Press Limited. ISBN 978-0-7509-6346-6.
- Lloyd, Thomas; Orbach, Julian; Scourfield, Robert (2006). Carmarthenshire and Ceredigion. Yale University Press. ISBN 0-300-10179-1.
- Longley, Darren; Burford, Tim; Stewart, James (2 March 2015). The Rough Guide to Wales. Rough Guides Limited. ISBN 978-0-241-20625-6.
- Nicholas, Alvin (30 August 2013). Supernatural Wales. Amberley Publishing Limited. ISBN 978-1-4456-1175-4.
- Rubery, Jim (21 October 2015). Walking in Carmarthenshire. Cicerone Press. ISBN 978-1-78362-256-6.
- Watkins, Graham (16 August 2014). Welsh Legends and Myths. Lulu.com. ISBN 978-1-291-98527-6.
