= Arthur Rice, 6th Baron Dynevor =

British peer

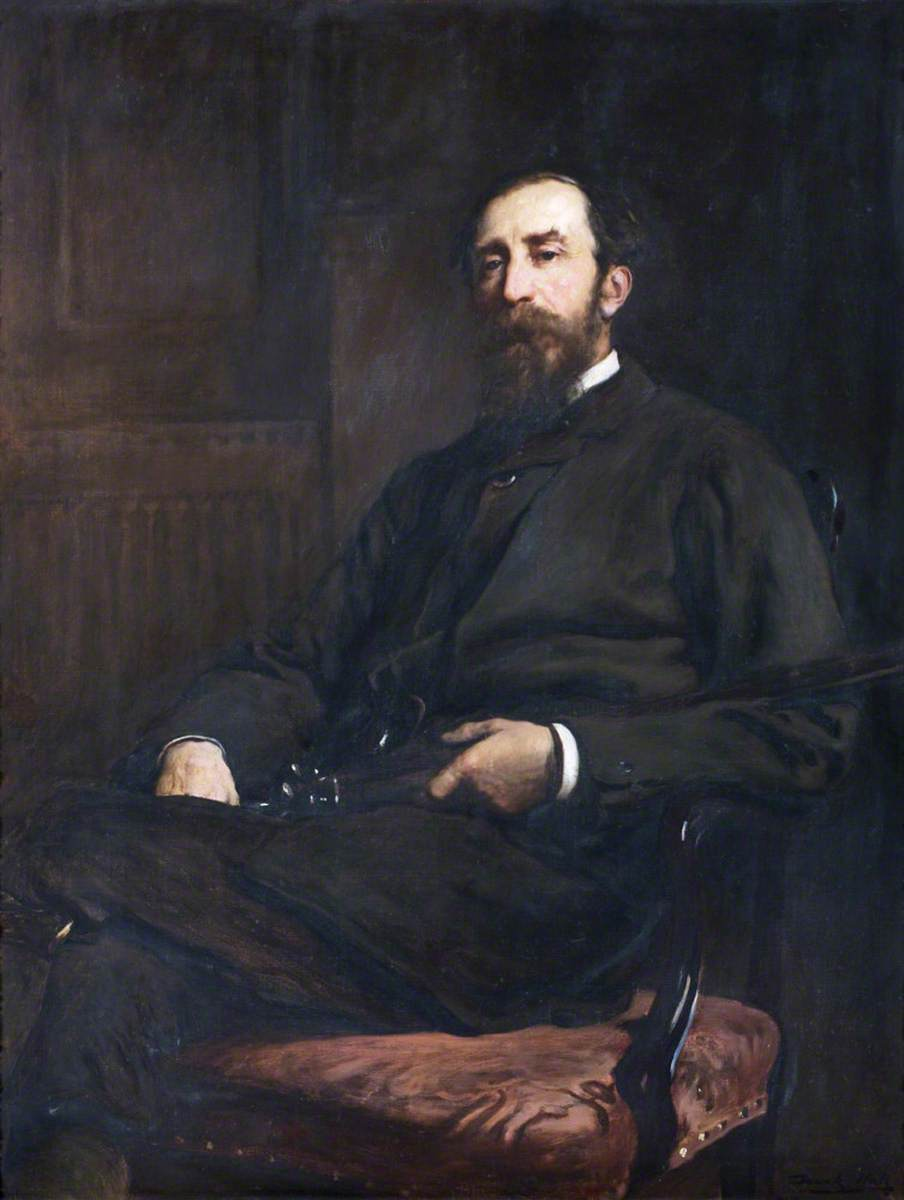
Arthur Rice, 6th Baron Dynevor

Arthur de Cardonnel FitzUryan Rice, 6th Baron Dynevor (24 January 1836 – 8 June 1911), was a British peer.

== Life ==
He was the son of Francis William Rice, 5th Baron Dynevor, and Harriett Ives Barker. His elder sister, Ellen Joyce, was a pioneer of women's emigration.

On 17 October 1855 Rice matriculated at Christ Church, Oxford. He gained a B.A. degree in 1855 and was awarded an M.A. degree in 1865.

Rice married Selina Lascelles, the daughter of Hon. Arthur Lascelles, the fifth son of Henry Lascelles, 2nd Earl of Harewood. The child of the couple was Walter FitzUryan Rice, born 17 August 1873. Walter later reverted to the Welsh form of his name "Rhys".

He became a member of Carmarthenshire County Council at the inaugural elections in 1889, representing Llandybie.

The 6th Baron Dynevor died on 8 June 1911 aged 75 at Dynevor Castle, now called Newton House.

Coat of arms of Arthur Rice, 6th Baron Dynevor
Crest A raven Sable. Escutcheon Argent a chevron between three ravens Sable. Supporters Dexter a griffin per fess Or and Argent wings addorsed and inverted tail between the legs, sinister a talbot Argent collared flory counterflory Gules ears Ermine and charged on the shoulder with a trefoil slipped Vert. Motto Secret Et Hardi (Secret And Bold))

Peerage of Great Britain
Preceded by Francis William Rice	Baron Dynevor; 1878–1911	Succeeded by Walter FitzUryan Rhys
