= Hugo Rhys, 10th Baron Dynevor =

British hereditary peer

Hugo Griffith Uryan Rhys, 10th Baron Dynevor (born 19 November 1966), is a British hereditary peer.

He was educated at Sussex House School, Bryanston School and at the University of East Anglia where he graduated with a degree in drama in 1988. The son of Richard Rhys, 9th Baron Dynevor, and Lucy Catherine King, he succeeded to the barony in 2008. He is the maternal grandson of Sir John Rothenstein. The heir presumptive to the barony is Robert David Arthur Rhys, a great-grandson of Walter Rice, 7th Baron Dynevor, and second cousin to the present Baron.

Coat of arms of Hugo Rhys, 10th Baron Dynevor
Crest A raven Sable. Escutcheon Argent a chevron between three ravens Sable. Supporters Dexter a griffin per fess Or and Argent wings addorsed and inverted tail between the legs, sinister a talbot Argent collared flory counterflory Gules ears Ermine and charged on the shoulder with a trefoil slipped Vert. Motto Secret Et Hardi (Secret And Bold))

Peerage of Great Britain
Preceded by Richard Rhys	Baron Dynevor; 2008–present	Incumbent; Heir apparent: Robert Rhys
