= Richard Rhys, 9th Baron Dynevor =

British peer

Grave of the Ninth Baron, St Tyfi's Church, Llandeilo

Richard Charles Uryan Rhys, 9th Baron Dynevor (19 June 1935 – 12 November 2008) was a British peer.

He was educated at Eton and at Magdalene College, Cambridge. In 1959 he married Lucy Catherine King, the only daughter of Sir John Knewstub Maurice Rothenstein CBE. They had one son and three daughters. The marriage was dissolved in 1978. His chief interest lay in The Black Raven Press of which he was a director.

In 1962 Lord Dynevor inherited the remaining holdings of the Llandeilo Estate, comprising 23 farms, and 2,000 acres (8 km^{2}), a ruined castle, a deer park with a herd of rare long horned white cattle, and a substantial death duties bill. The death duties were owed on both the 7th and 8th Barons.

Attempts were made to save the patrimony but eventually the castle was sold to a private buyer in 1974. The National Trust bought the deer park and the outer park at Dinefwr in 1987. Newton House was purchased by the Trust in 1990 having been through several hands since first sold by Lord Dynevor in 1974. It was in a very poor state of repair. The East Drive was acquired in 1992. The Home Farm was acquired in 2002. Cadw and the National Trust now control the estate of some 700 acres (3 km^{2}).

Coat of arms of Richard Rhys, 9th Baron Dynevor
Crest A raven Sable. Escutcheon Argent a chevron between three ravens Sable. Supporters Dexter a griffin per fess Or and Argent wings addorsed and inverted tail between the legs, sinister a talbot Argent collared flory counterflory Gules ears Ermine and charged on the shoulder with a trefoil slipped Vert. Motto Secret Et Hardi (Secret And Bold))

Peerage of Great Britain
Preceded by Charles Arthur Uryan Rhys	Baron Dynevor; 1962–2008	Succeeded by Hugo Griffith Uryan Rhys
