= Dryslwyn Castle =

Castle in Carmarthenshire, Wales

Coordinates: 51.862443°N 4.101479°W

- Castell Dryslwyn (Note: Since 2024, Cadw, who oversee the site, use this Welsh name only.) or Castell y Drysllwyn (Welsh)
- Carmarthenshire, Wales
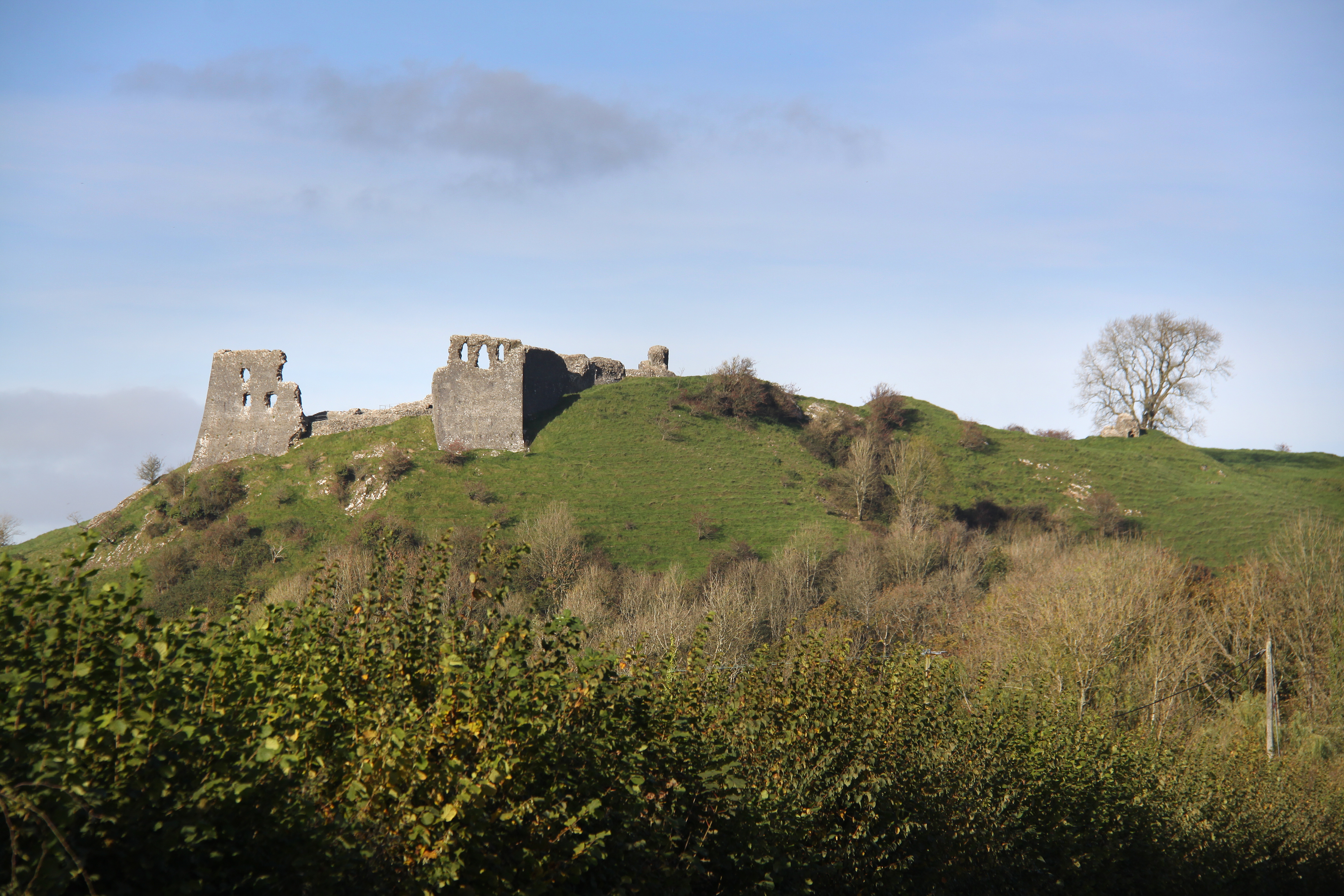
- Dryslwyn Castle, above the Towy Valley

Site information
- Type: Castle
- Website: Castell Dryslwyn (Cadw)

Site history
- Built: 1220s

Dryslwyn Castle (Welsh: Castell Dryslwyn or Castell y Drysllwyn) is a native Welsh castle, sited on a rocky hill roughly halfway between Llandeilo and Carmarthen in Wales. It stands on high ground overlooking the Towy Valley with extensive views. It was built in about the 1220s by one of the princes of the kingdom of Deheubarth, and changed hands several times in the struggles between the Welsh and English over the ensuing centuries. It is considered one of the most important remaining structures built by a Welsh chieftain and is a Grade I listed building.

== Castle of Deheubarth ==
Perched on the top of an isolated, rocky hill above the Towy Valley, Dryslwyn Castle occupies a splendid defensive position. It may occupy a spot previously used in as a fortification in prehistoric times but no evidence has been found to support this theory. In the twelfth century, Rhys ap Gruffydd, often known as "Lord Rhys", reigned over the kingdom of Deheubarth and brought it a period of peace and stability. On his death in 1197, his three sons contested his inheritance and fought between themselves for supremacy. Neighbouring Welsh kingdoms and the English took advantage of this to infiltrate Deheubarth and it was around this time that Dryslwyn Castle was built.

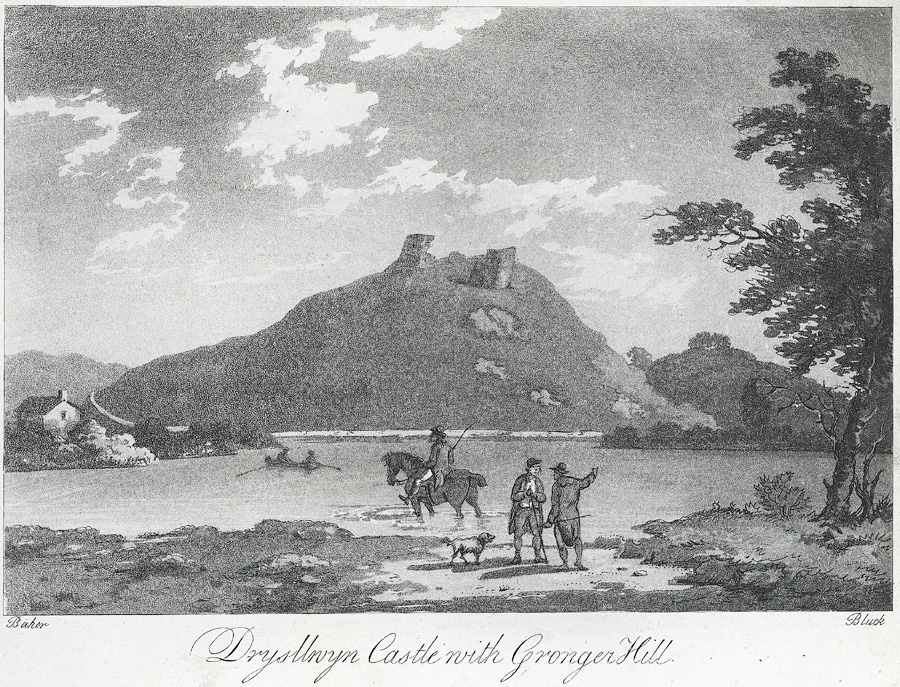
Dryslwyn Castle with Gronger Hill

It is not clear precisely who built it, but it was probably constructed in the 1220s by one of the princes of Deheubarth, perhaps Rhys Gryg. In any event, the castle at Dryslwyn was, along with the neighbouring Dinefwr Castle, for a long time central to the security of the kingdom. It was apparently assaulted in 1246, because it was mentioned in an ancient chronicle, Annales Cambrie, where a siege of the castle by the Seneschal of Carmarthen was mentioned. He was apparently acting on behalf of its "rightful owner", but who that rightful owner was, or whether the siege was successful, is not known.

It may have been that Rhys Gryg built the two fortresses of Dryslwyn and Dinefwr in order to provide legacies for his two sons after his death, which happened in 1234. The two castles are of very similar construction, with a round tower with flared base inside a ward enclosed by a curtain wall that contoured round the hillside. The ward contained a great hall and an adjoining building that was probably a kitchen. Between the hall and the curtain wall was an enclosed small structure that it has been suggested may have been a prison.

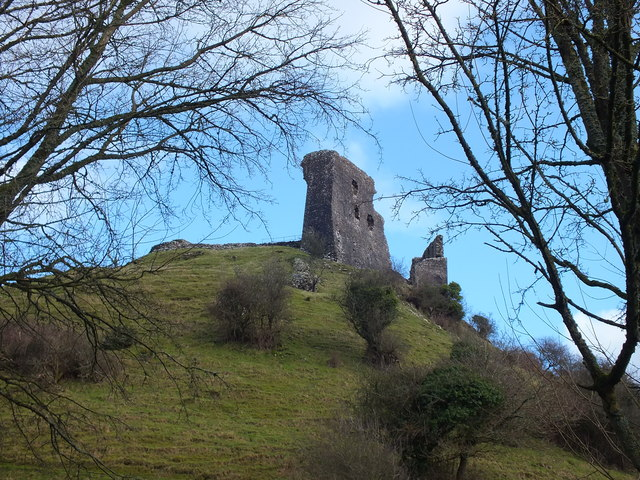
Dryslwyn Castle, side view

The castle underwent a lengthy period of expansion in the late thirteenth century. After the death of the last native prince of Wales, Dafydd ap Gruffudd, in 1283, the castle was one of the few remaining substantial stone castles in Wales to be held by a Welshman; the most prominent surviving Welsh lord, Rhys ap Maredudd, continued to augment the castle's defences. He was allowed by the English to keep his castle as he had shown a more conciliatory attitude towards them than other Welsh lords. However, in 1287 he revolted against English rule, and the castle was besieged and captured after a three-week siege by the forces of King Edward I. The English troops numbered 11,000 and methods of assault included the use of a trebuchet and the undermining of the curtain walls. Several English knights were killed when one of the mine workings collapsed while they were inspecting it. Rhys's revolt petered out the following year, and Rhys himself was captured and executed in 1292.

Dryslwyn was seized by Owain Glyndŵr in the summer of 1403 and when the English forces recaptured it they decommissioned it by blocking various access routes, walling up the gatehouse, removing the treads from stone stairs and even removing the hinges from the main gate. At some later stage, all the major buildings were burned to the ground. Following this a lot of the stone was removed from the site.

== Structure ==
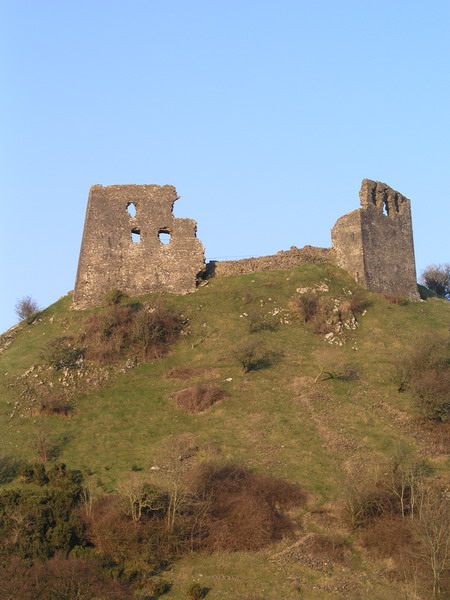
Dryslwyn Castle

The castle of limestone walls was built in the 1220s, and was systematically demolished in the early fifteenth century, presumably in an attempt to stop Welsh rebels using it again. The polygonal inner ward contains principal remains to the south-west, with traces of the middle and outer ward to the north-east. The early-thirteenth-century curtain wall to the inner ward only stands 1 m (3 ft) high.

There is a garderobe to the east side, and a remodelled thirteenth-century gatehouse to the north-east, surviving at foundation level only. On the south side of the gatehouse is the Round Tower, the original keep. The foundations of the original great hall and Rhys ap Maredudd's hall survive.

== Dryslwyn today ==
Little is left of the original structure and much of what is now visible has been revealed by excavation. A small portion of the middle and outer walls survive, mostly associated with the middle and outer gates. The best-preserved remains are within the inner ward, and here can be seen the polygonal plan that was adopted to fit in with the shape of the hilltop.

It is considered one of the most important remaining structures built by a Welsh prince and is a Grade I listed building, being noteworthy as the only native Welsh castle to have three wards.

Since 2024, Cadw have used the Welsh name Castell Dryslwyn in English, as part of an effort to standardise the names in both languages.

== Gallery ==
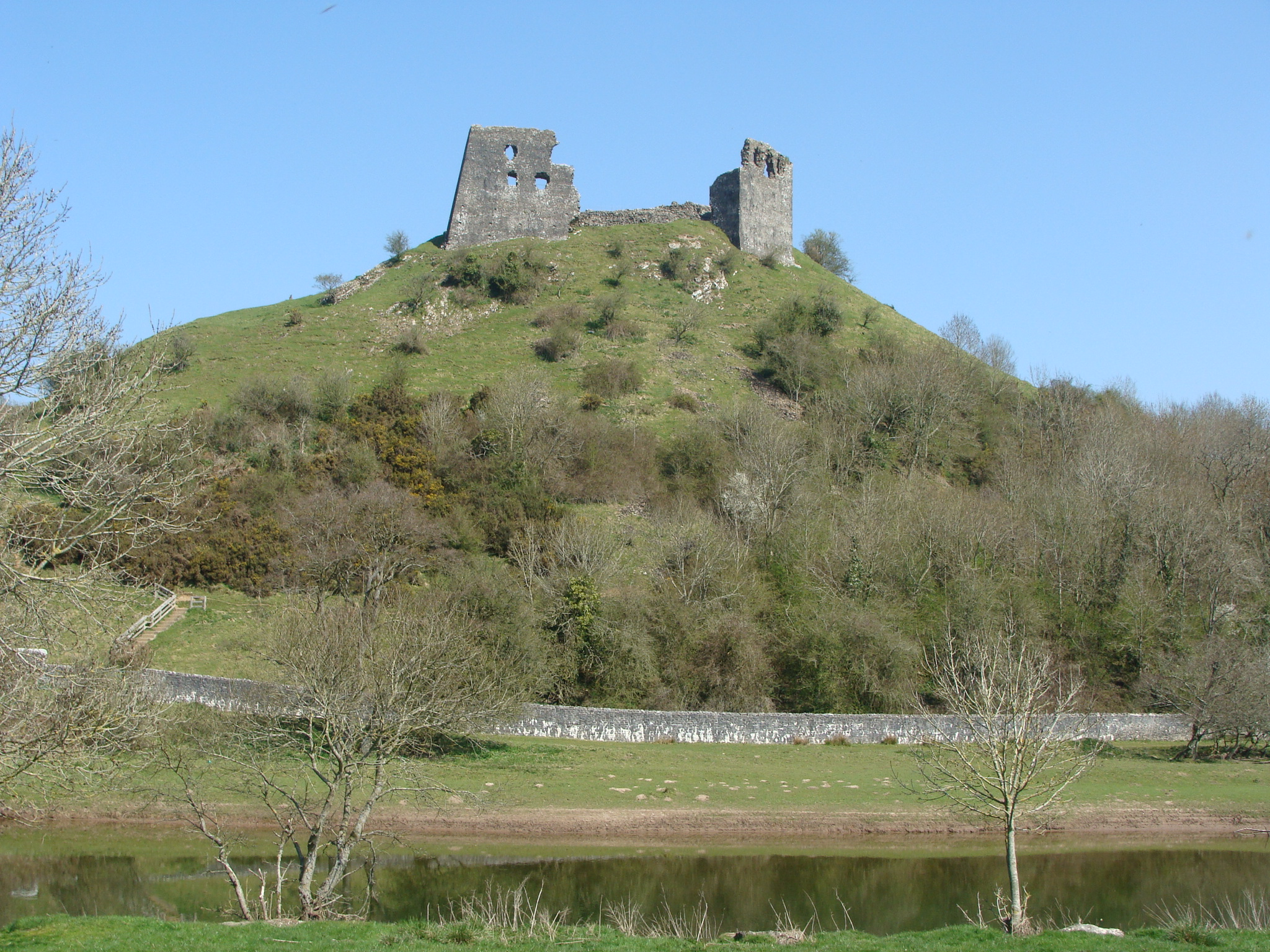
The Castle and the River Towy

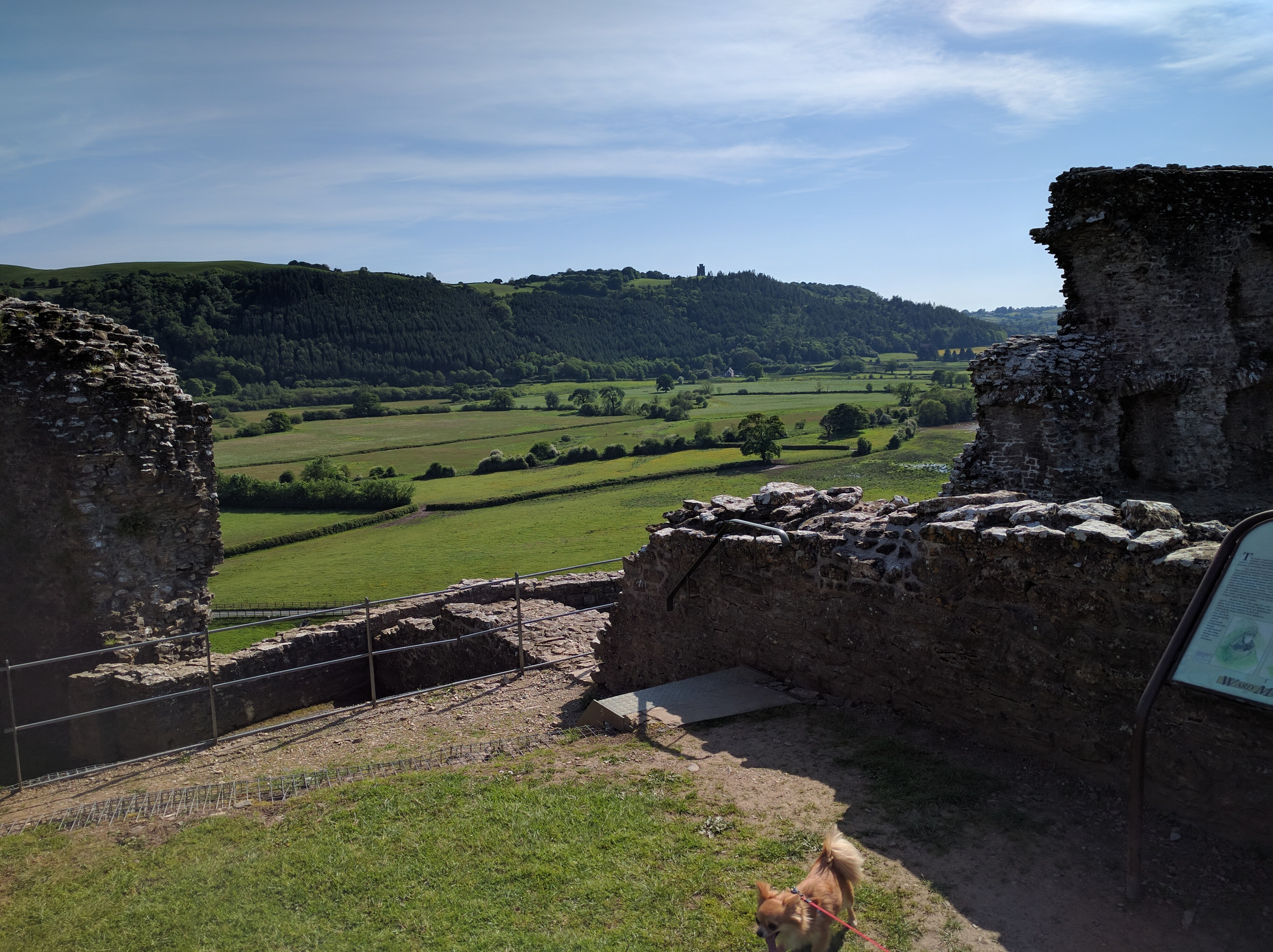
View over the Towy Valley

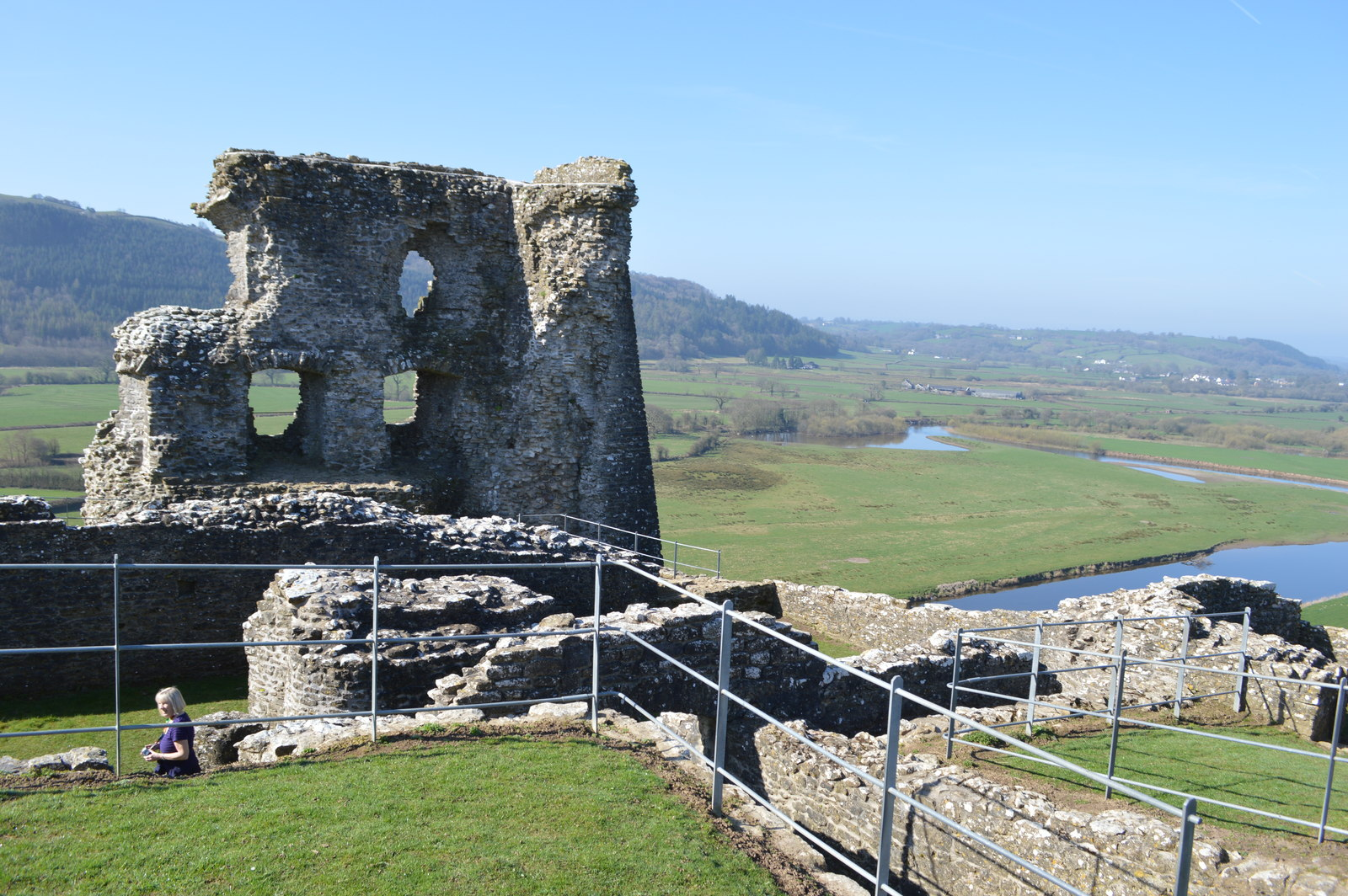
View over Ruins and river Towy

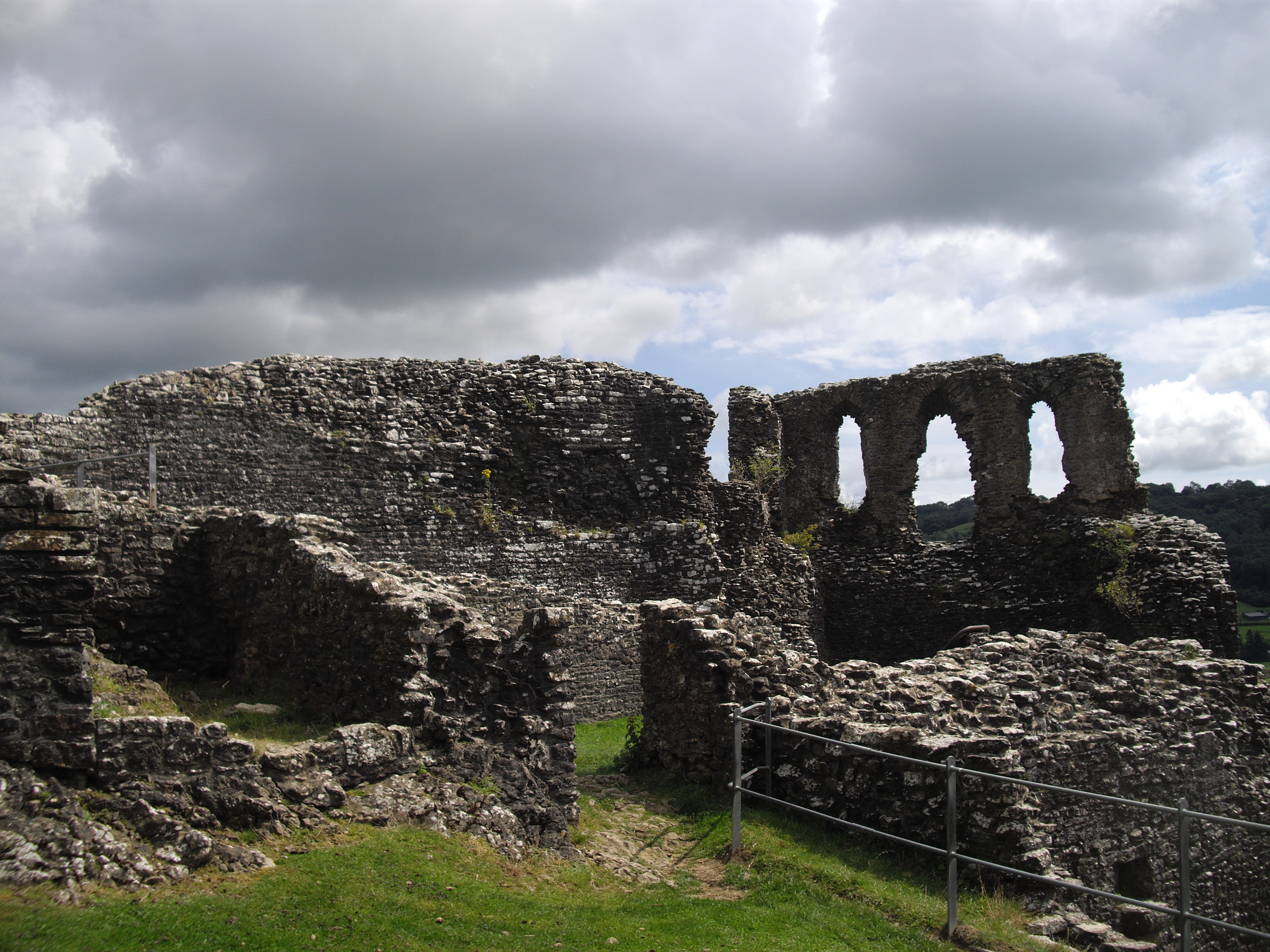
Ruins walls, open to the public

== See also ==
- List of castles in Wales
- Castles in Great Britain and Ireland
