= Rhys ap Maredudd =

Royal member of Deheubarth (died 1292)

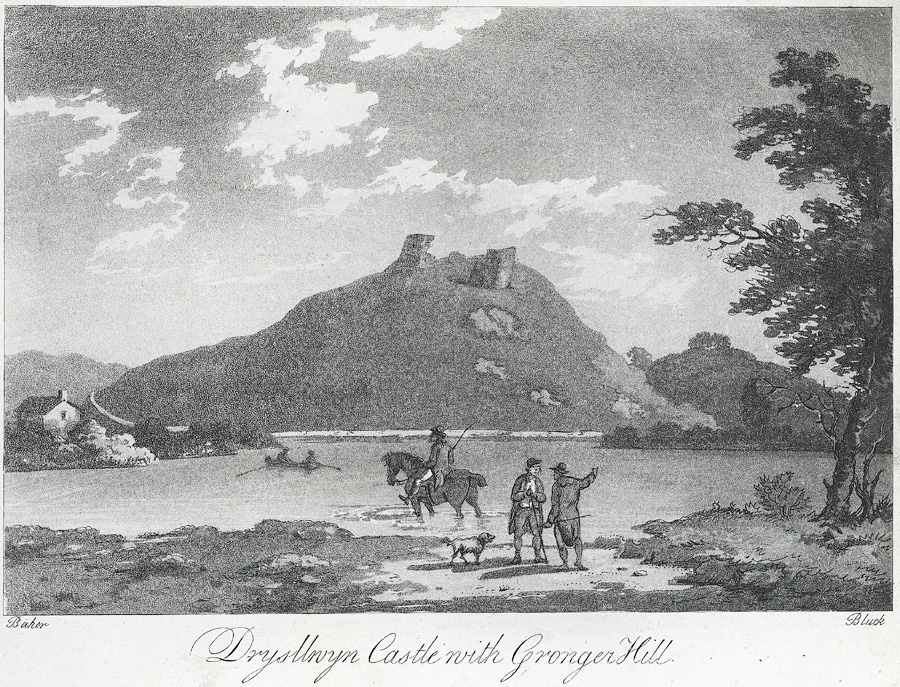

Rhys ap Maredudd (c. 1250 – 2 June 1292) was a senior member of the Welsh royal house of Deheubarth, a principality of Medieval Wales. He was the great grandson of The Lord Rhys (died 1197), prince of south Wales, and the last ruler of a united Deheubarth. He is best known for his leadership of a revolt in south Wales in 1287–88 whilst King Edward I of England was away in Gascony.

Because Deheubarth fragmented after the Lord Rhys' death in 1197, Rhys ap Maredudd's father had ruled over a truncated portion of the ancient kingdom. Rhys succeeded his father in 1271 as lord of the region of Deheubarth known as the Cantref Mawr, and considered himself custodian of Dinefwr, the royal capital of Deheubarth. He ruled the Cantref Mawr from 1271, though not under the aegis of the Prince of Wales, Llywelyn ap Gruffudd, as his father had, so relations between the two men appear to have been cold. He was among the first Welsh noblemen to submit to the English crown during the Anglo-Welsh war of 1276–77, on the grounds that his claims to the lands of Maenordeilo, Mallaen, Caeo and Mabelfyw, and Dinefwr Castle – all within Deheubarth and ruled by his great-grandfather – would be properly considered. The agreement has been indicative to some historians of Rhys' ambitions to reconstitute Deheubarth as a unified kingdom within the principality of Wales.

He continued to exercise power in the Cantref Mawr after Llywelyn's death in 1282, and the execution of the last native prince of Wales, Dafydd ap Gruffudd, the following year. His failure, alone of all the noblemen of Deheubarth, to adhere to Llywelyn and Dafydd's cause in the war of 1282–3 led to king Edward I of England bestowing additional lands on Rhys for his allegiance to the English crown. Edward, however, refused to deliver to Rhys the long sought-after castle at Dinefwr. This state of affairs led Rhys to make Dryslwyn castle his main residence, and it seems likely that he embarked on a substantial building programme there in the late 1270s and early 1280s.

Rhys endeavoured to remain loyal to the English crown in the hope he may be restored to more of his former patrimony, but no such offers were forthcoming from the king – instead, Edward forced Rhys to quitclaim the castle to him in October 1283. Taking advantage of Edward’s absence in Gascony in 1287 he rebelled and led the capture of most of Ystrad Tywi, the heartland of Deheubarth, including the castles at Dinefwr and Carreg Cennen. Though the revolt was quelled by the autumn, it broke out again in November, and was only brought to a conclusion after a ten-day siege of Rhys' final stronghold, the castle at Newcastle Emlyn, in January 1288. After Newcastle Emlyn's fall Rhys went into hiding; one tradition has him fleeing to Ireland, but this remains unsubstantiated. He was eventually captured in 1291 and executed for treason at York in 1292. His son, also named Rhys, was arrested after his execution, and was imprisoned, firstly in Bristol Castle and then in Norwich; he was still alive in 1340. Late genealogical sources also give a daughter, Morfudd, and an individual occurring in 1289, Maredudd ap Richard [sic] ap Maredudd, may also have been his son.

The next Welshman to lead a revolt against the English crown was Madog ap Llywelyn in Gwynedd.
