= Tyfei =

Tyfei (early 6th century) was a martyr and saint of the medieval Welsh church.

== Life ==
Tyfei ap Budic was the second son of Budic II of Brittany and his second wife, Anowed or Arianwedd, the daughter of Saint Issel and sister of Saint Teilo. The young Tyfei attempted to intervene in a heated argument between a swineherd and the owner of a field the animals had trespassed. In the course of the confrontation, Tyfei sustained an accidental, 'though lethal wound from a javelin.

Tyfei was buried at Penalun (Penally) in Dyfed.

== Veneration ==
Although his death was apparently accidental, veneration of Tyfei was likely due to his family connections, and he is sometimes called a martyr. At the time, Budic was in exile, a cousin having usurped his throne in Cornouaille. Patricia Healy Wasyliw suggests "...that the legend may mask a political assassination".

Churches were dedicated to St. Tyfei at Llandyfeisant, and Lamphey.
