= Francis Rice, 5th Baron Dynevor =

British clergyman and peer (1804–1878)

Francis William Rice, 5th Baron Dynevor (May 10, 1804 – August 13, 1878) was a British clergyman and peer. He was the second son of the Reverend Edward Rice, Dean of Gloucester himself second son of the 2nd Baroness Dynevor. The Dean's wife, Rice's mother, Charlotte Lascelles though born the illegitimate daughter of General Francis Lascelles and Ann Catley, a singer, was a niece of Edward Lascelles, 1st Earl of Harewood.

Rice was educated at Westminster School and matriculated at Christ Church, Oxford on 18 October 1822. He obtained a B.A. degree in 1826 and was awarded an M.A. degree in 1847.

From 1827 to 1878 Rice was the Vicar of Fairford, Gloucestershire.

He married twice. His first wife was Harriett Ives Barker, daughter of Daniel Raymond Barker, whom he married on 3 February 1830. Their first child Ellen Joyce who was an emigration pioneer and the second was Arthur de Cardonnel FitzUryan Rice, later 6th Baron Dynevor. Francis Rice was widowed on 22 July 1854.

His second wife was Eliza Amelia Knox, first daughter of Rev. Henry Carnegie Knox, the Rector of Lechlade, Gloucestershire. He married her 18 November 1856.

In 1869, upon the death of his cousin, Rice succeeded to the title of Baron Dynevor as his cousin only had sisters and daughters. He died 3 August 1878 aged 74.

Coat of arms of Francis Rice, 5th Baron Dynevor
Crest A raven Sable. Escutcheon Argent a chevron between three ravens Sable. Supporters Dexter a griffin per fess Or and Argent wings addorsed and inverted tail between the legs, sinister a talbot Argent collared flory counterflory Gules ears Ermine and charged on the shoulder with a trefoil slipped Vert. Motto Secret Et Hardi (Secret And Bold))

Peerage of Great Britain
Preceded by George Rice-Trevor	Baron Dynevor; 1869–1878	Succeeded by Arthur de Cardonnel FitzUryan Rice
