= St Tyfi's Church, Llandyfeisant =

Coordinates: 51.8810°N 4.0024°W

St Tyfi's Church
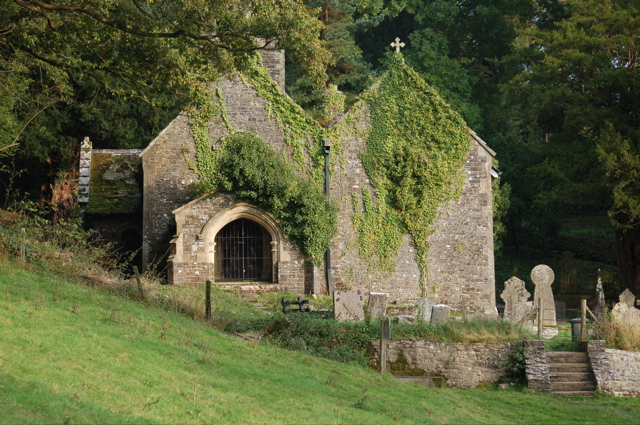
- St Tyfi's Church
- Location: Dynevor Park, Llandeilo
- Country: Wales
- Denomination: Anglican

History
- Founded: Medieval

Architecture
- Heritage designation: Grade II
- Designated: 18 March 1988
- Architectural type: Church

St Tyfi's Church or Llandyfeisant Church is the former parish church of Llandyfeisant, near Llandeilo and part of the Dinefwr Park estate in Carmarthenshire, Wales. It was dedicated to the Welsh saint Tyfei, nephew of Saint Teilo. As of May 2026, St Tyfi's church is in the process of being transferred to the care of the national charity, the Friends of Friendless Churches.

== History ==
The history of the site may stretch back to pre-Christian times. The small stone church was first constructed in medieval times. It was first mentioned in the Ecclesiastical Taxation of 1291. By 1324, it was assigned to Talley Abbey. The building may have been replaced or enlarged in the late thirteenth or early fourteenth century.

== Architecture ==
The church was almost entirely rebuilt in the second half of the nineteenth century. The architect was likely R. Kyrke Pearson from Oswestry, who redesigned Newton House for Lord Dynefwr. The exterior has rubble-stone facings, gable parapets and a stone slate roof. The interior has an open, arched-brace roof with collar-beams and stone corbels, and a window in the south wall from the 13th century from the previous structure.

The building is no longer used for religious purposes. In 1961, the font and stained-glass window war memorial were removed to nearby St Teilo Church for safekeeping. The building was used as a visitor's information centre by The Welsh Wildlife Trust in the late 1980s and early 1990s. Owned by The Church in Wales and leased to The Welsh Wildlife Trust; the church has over the years fell into disrepair and needed restoration work. The Wildlife Trust met the National Trust in 2011 to discuss restoration. New negotiations were started in 2018. In 2026, with the church designated "At Risk", plans were begun by the Friends of Friendless Churches to raise £1 million to restore two churches, including St Tyfi's.

Although occasionally referred to as St Tyfi's Church it is mainly referred to as Llandyfeisant Church and is a building of significant historic interest to the area with a strong connection to The Dinefwr estate. The last Lord Dinefwr is buried in the church grounds as well as many servants who worked on the Dinefwr estate.

The building was listed at Grade II on 18 March 1988, as a "church of moderate architectural interest in an exceptional location at Dynevwr Park, with a fine steeply sloping burial ground with old headstones".
