= Baron Dynevor =

Barony in the Peerage of Great Britain

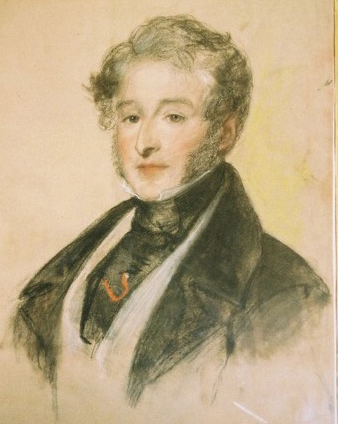
George Talbot Rice, 3rd Baron Dynevor.

Baron Dinevor, of Dinevor in the County of Carmarthen (usually spelt Dynevor or Dinefwr), is a title in the Peerage of Great Britain. It was created on 17 October 1780 for William Talbot, 1st Earl Talbot, with remainder to his daughter, Lady Cecil, wife of George Rice, a member of a prominent Welsh family. On Lord Talbot's death the earldom became extinct because he left no sons to succeed to it, while the barony of Talbot also held by him was inherited by his nephew. The barony of Dynevor passed according to the special remainder to his daughter, the second holder of the title. In 1787 Lady Dynevor (Cecil Rice) assumed by Royal licence the surname of de Cardonnel in lieu of Rice.

Her son, the third Baron, George Talbot Rice, represented Carmarthen in the House of Commons and served as Lord Lieutenant of Carmarthenshire. In 1793 he assumed by Royal licence the surname of de Cardonnel, but in 1817 he resumed by Royal licence the surname of Rice. George Talbot Rice (Talbot-Rice) was succeeded by his son, the fourth Baron. He also sat as Member of Parliament for Carmarthen. In 1824, on inheriting the estates of the Trevor family of Glynde in Sussex, he assumed by Royal licence the additional surname of Trevor.

He was succeeded by his first cousin, the fifth Baron. He was the second son of the Very Reverend the Hon. Edward Rice, second son of the second Baroness. His grandson, the seventh Baron, represented Brighton in Parliament as a Conservative and served as Lord Lieutenant of Carmarthenshire. In 1916 he assumed by Royal licence for himself and his issue the surname of Rhys in lieu of Rice. His son, the eighth Baron, was a Conservative Member of Parliament for Romford and Guildford. As of 2010 the title is held by his grandson, the tenth Baron, who succeeded in 2008.

The Rhys and Talbot Rice (Talbot-Rice) family can claim descent from the fifteenth century Rhys ap Thomas who had been granted extensive lands throughout west Wales as a reward for his leading role in the campaign that led to Henry VII's victory at the Battle of Bosworth in 1485. He or his men may even have delivered the fatal blow to Richard III.

== Barons Dynevor ==
- William Talbot, 1st Earl Talbot, 1st Baron Dynevor (1710–1782)
- Cecil de Cardonnel, 2nd Baroness Dynevor (1735–1793)
- George Talbot Rice, 3rd Baron Dynevor (1765–1852)
- George Rice-Trevor, 4th Baron Dynevor (1795–1869)
- Francis William Rice, 5th Baron Dynevor (1804–1878)
- Arthur de Cardonnel FitzUryan Rice, 6th Baron Dynevor (1836–1911)
- Walter FitzUryan Rice, 7th Baron Dynevor (1873–1956)
- Charles Arthur Uryan Rhys, 8th Baron Dynevor (1899–1962)
- Richard Charles Uryan Rhys, 9th Baron Dynevor (1935–2008)
- Hugo Griffith Uryan Rhys, 10th Baron Dynevor (b. 1966)

The heir presumptive is the present holder's second cousin Robert David Arthur Rhys (b. 1963).
The heir presumptive's heir apparent is Robert's son Edward (b. 2002).

== Family tree ==
Barons and Earls Talbot, Earls of Shrewsbury (2nd creation), Dukes of Shrewsbury, and Earls of Waterford

Baron Talbot (1st creation), 1331)
Gilbert Talbot c. 1276/1277–1346; 1st Baron Talbot
Richard Talbot c. 1306–1356; 2nd Baron Talbot
Gilbert Talbot; 1332–1387; 3rd Baron Talbot
Richard Talbot c. 1361–1396; 4th Baron Talbot	Ankaret le Strange; 1361–1413; 7th Baroness Strange of Blackmere
Earl of Shrewsbury (2nd creation), 1442; Earl of Waterford, 1446
Gilbert Talbot c. 1383–1419; 8th Baron Strange of Blackmere, 5th Baron Talbot,	John Talbot; 1390–1453; 1st Earl of Shrewsbury, etc., 10th Baron Strange of Blackmere, 7th Baron Talbot, 6th Baron Furnivall jure uxoris	Maud Neville d. 1422; 6th Baroness Furnivall suo jure
Ankaret Talbot d. 1421; 9th Baroness Strange of Blackmere, 6th Baroness Talbot	John Talbot; 1413–1460; 2nd Earl of Shrewsbury, etc., 11th Baron Strange of Blackmere, 8th Baron Talbot, 7th Baron Furnivall
John Talbot; 1448–1473; 3rd Earl of Shrewsbury, etc., 12th Baron Strange of Blackmere, 9th Baron Talbot, 8th Baron Furnivall	Gilbert Talbot; 1452–1517
George Talbot; 1468–1538; 4th Earl of Shrewsbury, etc., 13th Baron Strange of Blackmere, 10th Baron Talbot, 9th Baron Furnivall	John Talbot c. 1485–1549
Francis Talbot; 1500–1560; 5th Earl of Shrewsbury, etc., 14th Baron Strange of Blackmere, 11th Baron Talbot, 10th Baron Furnivall	John Talbot d. 1555	John Talbot d. 1581
George Talbot; 1528–1590; 6th Earl of Shrewsbury, etc., 15th Baron Strange of Blackmere, 12th Baron Talbot, 11th Baron Furnivall	John Talbot of Grafton; 1545–1611	Sherrington Talbot; 1577–c. 1642
Gilbert Talbot; 1552–1616; 7th Earl of Shrewsbury, etc., 16th Baron Strange of Blackmere, 13th Baron Talbot, 12th Baron Furnivall	Edward Talbot; 1561–1617; 8th Earl of Shrewsbury, etc.	George Talbot; 1567–1630; 9th Earl of Shrewsbury, etc.	John Talbot d. c. 1607	William Talbot d. 1686
Alethea Howard; 1585–1654; 17th Baroness Strange of Blackmere, 14th Baroness Talbot, 13th Baroness Furnivall	Thomas Howard; 1585–1646; Earl of Arundel	John Talbot; 1601–1654; 10th Earl of Shrewsbury, etc.	William Talbot; 1658–1730
Barons Talbot (1st creation), Barons Furnivall, and Barons Strange of Blackmere continued in Dukes of Norfolk family tree
Barons Talbot (2nd creation – of Hensol), 1733
Francis Talbot; 1623–1667; 11th Earl of Shrewsbury, etc.	Gilbert Talbot d. 1711	Charles Talbot; 1685–1737; 1st Baron Talbot of Hensol
Duke of Shrewsbury and Marquess of Alton, 1694	Earl Talbot (1st creation), 1761; Baron Dynevor, 1780
Charles Talbot; 1660–1718; Duke of Shrewsbury, etc., 12th Earl of Shrewsbury, etc.	Gilbert Talbot; 1673–1743; 13th Earl of Shrewsbury, etc.	George Talbot d. 1733	William Talbot; 1710–1782; Earl Talbot, etc., 2nd Baron Talbot of Hensol	John Talbot; 1712–1756
Dukedom of Shrewsbury and Marquessat of Alton extinct, 1718	Earldom Talbot (1st creation) extinct, 1782
Earl Talbot (2nd creation) of Hensol in the County of Glamorgan and Viscount of Ingestre, in the County of Stafford, 1784
George Talbot; 1719–1787; 14th Earl of Shrewsbury, etc.	Charles Talbot; 1722–1766	Francis Talbot; 1728–1813	Cecil de Cardonnel; 1735–1793; 2nd Baroness Dynevor	John Chetwynd-Talbot; 1749–1793; 1st Earl Talbot, etc., 3rd Baron Talbot of Hensol
Charles Talbot; 1753–1827; 15th Earl of Shrewsbury, etc.	Joseph Talbot; 1765–1815	George Talbot Rice; 1765–1852; 3rd Baron Dynevor	Edward Rice	Charles Chetwynd-Talbot; 1777–1849; 2nd Earl Talbot, etc., 4th Baron Talbot of Hensol
John Talbot; 1791–1852; 16th Earl of Shrewsbury, etc.	John Talbot; 1782–1838	George Rice-Trevor; 1795–1869; 4th Baron Dynevor	Francis William Rice; 1804–1878; 5th Baron Dynevor	Henry Chetwynd-Talbot; 1803–1868; 18th Earl of Shrewsbury, etc., 3rd Earl Talbot, etc., 5th Baron Talbot of Hensol
Bertram Talbot; 1832–1856; 17th Earl of Shrewsbury, etc.	Arthur de Cardonnel FitzUryan Rice; 1836–1911; 6th Baron Dynevor	Charles Chetwynd-Talbot; 1830–1877; 19th Earl of Shrewsbury, etc., 4th Earl Talbot, etc., 6th Baron Talbot of Hensol
Walter FitzUryan Rice; 1873–1956; 7th Baron Dynevor	Charles Chetwynd-Talbot; 1860–1921; 20th Earl of Shrewsbury, etc., 5th Earl Talbot, etc., 7th Baron Talbot of Hensol
Charles Arthur Uryan Rhys; 1899–1962; 8th Baron Dynevor	David Reginald Rhys; 1907–1991	Charles Chetwynd-Talbot; 1882–1915
Richard Charles Uryan Rhys; 1935–2008; 9th Baron Dynevor	Llewelyn Arthur Rhys; 1935–2005	John Chetwynd-Talbot; 1914–1980; 21st Earl of Shrewsbury, etc., 6th Earl Talbot, etc., 8th Baron Talbot of Hensol
Hugo Griffith Uryan Rhys b. 1966; 10th Baron Dynevor	Robert David Arthur Rhys b. 1963	Charles Chetwynd-Talbot b. 1952; 22nd Earl of Shrewsbury, etc., 7th Earl Talbot, etc., 9th Baron Talbot of Hensol
Heir presumptive to the Dynevor barony
James Chetwynd-Talbot b. 1978 styled Viscount Ingestre
George Chetwynd-Talbot b. 2013

== Coat of arms ==
Coat of arms of Baron Dynevor
Crest A raven Sable. Escutcheon Argent a chevron between three ravens Sable. Supporters Dexter a griffin per fess Or and Argent wings addorsed and inverted tail between the legs, sinister a talbot Argent collared flory counterflory Gules ears Ermine and charged on the shoulder with a trefoil slipped Vert. Motto Secret Et Hardi (Secret And Bold))

== See also ==
- Dinefwr Castle
