= John Plumptre (priest) =

English Anglican dean and author (1754–1825)

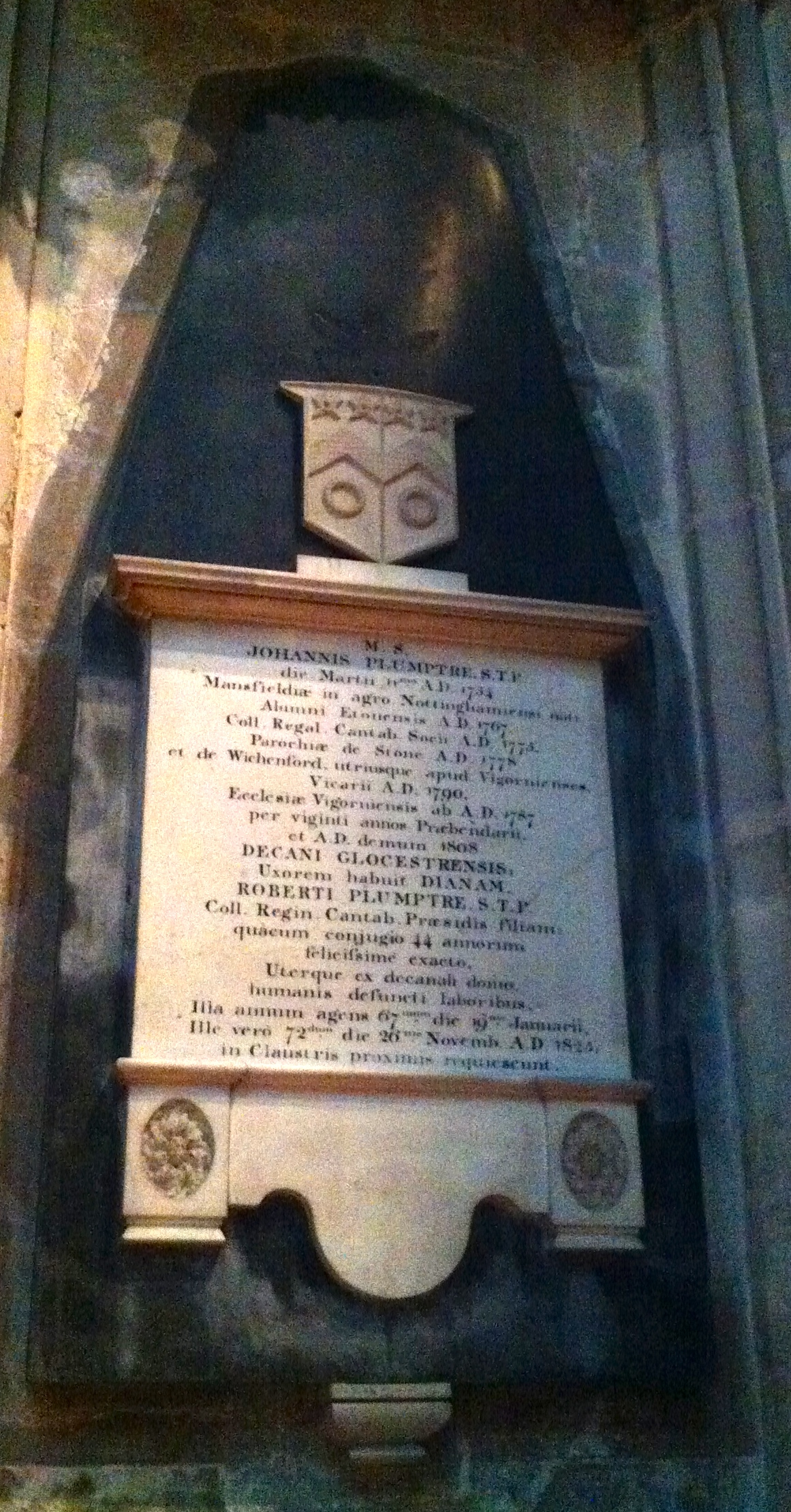
Memorial to John Plumptre in Gloucester Cathedral

John Plumptre (11 March 1754 – 26 November 1825) was an English Anglican dean and author. He was educated at Eton and King's College, Cambridge (elected Fellow, 1776). From 1778 until his death on 26 November 1825, he was Vicar of Stone, Worcestershire; to which he added, in 1790, the living at Wichenford; and, in 1808, the office of Dean of Gloucester.

Church of England titles
Preceded by John Luxmoore	Dean of Gloucester; 1808–1825	Succeeded by Edward Rice
