= Dinefwr Park National Nature Reserve =

Site of Special Scientific Interest in Wales

Dinefwr Park
- National Nature Reserve
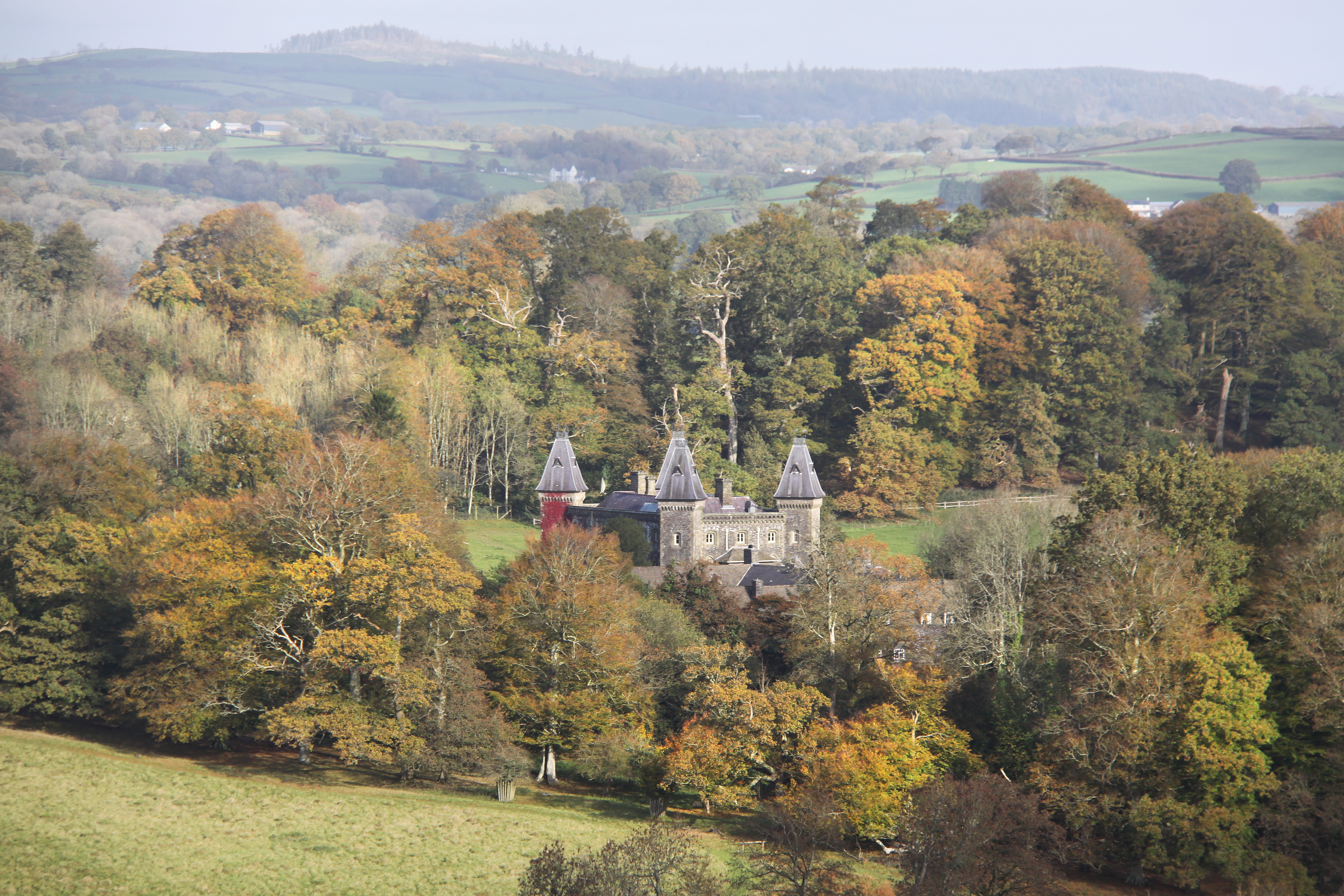
- Dinefwr Park

- Dinefwr shown within Wales
- Location: Carmarthenshire, Wales
- Nearest city: Llandeilo
- Coordinates: 51.880°N 4.016°W
- Area: 800 acres (320 ha)
- Established: 2007
- Governing body: National Trust
- Dinefwr Estate
- Site of Special Scientific Interest
- Area of search: Carmarthenshire
- Grid reference: SN615224
- Interest: Biological
- Area: 553 acres (224 ha)
- Notification date: 1999

Cadw/ICOMOS Register of Parks and Gardens of Special Historic Interest in Wales
- Official name: Plas Dinefwr
- Type: Grade I
- Designated: 2002
- Reference no.: PGW (Dy) 12 (CAM)

Dinefwr Park National Nature Reserve is an 800 acres (320 ha) estate about a mile (1.5 kilometres) from the centre of Llandeilo in Carmarthenshire owned by the National Trust, with a mansion in the centre. The highest point is occupied by the ruined Dinefwr Castle, ancient castle of the Deheubarth kingdom. It is a grade I Historic Park and a Site of Special Scientific Interest.

== Name ==
There are 22 known variants on the name, including 'Dynefwr' and the more anglicised 'Dynevor', but also, from the 13th century, Newton, or its Welsh equivalent, Y Drenewydd, being the new borough established by the Rhys family from 1297. Dinefwr in its various spellings, has an unknown origin or meaning, and both the park and the 18th century mansion have been known as Plas Dinefwr. The nearby medieval castle and the later mansion have both at times been called 'Dinefwr Castle'. Since the park and mansion were acquired by the National Trust, the terminology has started to settle towards calling the mansion 'Newton House', the medieval ruin 'Dinefwr Castle' and the park 'Dinefwr Park'.

== Nature reserve ==
The Park, along with Newton House in its centre, is owned by the National Trust and is open to the public. It is the only parkland national nature reserve in Wales, having been designate in 2007. It has over 300 trees at least 400 years old, plus ancient pastureland, landscaped valley views and a chance to see fallow deer and rare white park cattle throughout the year. The latter have been present in the area for over a thousand years, and make appearances in the laws of Hywel Dda. It is listed at Grade I on the Cadw/ICOMOS Register of Parks and Gardens of Special Historic Interest in Wales.

The estate slopes down to the level fields of the River Tywi floodplain, where small lakes lend interest to the landscape.

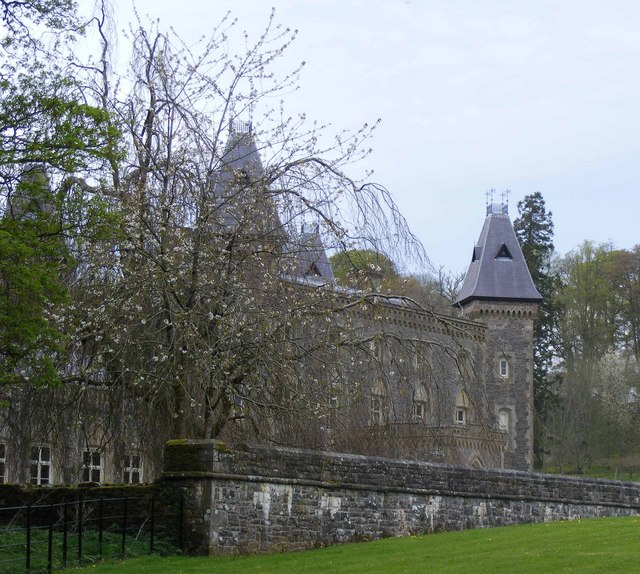
Newton House, in the centre of Dinefwr Park, Llandeilo

== Newton House ==
Within the park is Newton House, which stands on the site of a medieval town-plant. It was replaced by a mansion of 1660, which was given a complete re-build in a Victorian Gothic style in the 1850s. The estate was sold by Richard Dinevor in 1972. The deer park and nature reserve were acquired by the National Trust in 1986, and the house 4 years later.

== Dinefwr Castle ==
The ruins of Dinefwr Castle are situated in the grounds of the park, within Castle Woods, woodland owned since 1979 by the Wildlife Trust of South and West Wales. However the castle itself, which also opens to the public, is in the care of Cadw, being a site first occupied by Rhodri the Great in the 9th century, and subsequently the chief castle of the kingdom of Deheubarth. Also in the woods of the park is St Tyfi's Church, the former parish church of Llandyfeisant. It is a Grade II listed building.

== Roman forts ==
In 2003 the outlines of two overlapping Roman forts were discovered during a ground radar survey. Further investigation in 2005 revealed that the earlier fort was the larger site of eight acres which dated to the late 70s AD and could have housed up to 2000 men. The smaller, 3.5 acre fort was a later garrison fort. This also had a vicus near its north east entrance. The forts are dated to the latter part of the 1st Century AD (not long after the military conquest of Wales) and were abandoned early in the 2nd Century AD.

== See also ==
- List of National Trust properties in Wales
- List of Cadw properties
- National nature reserves in Wales
