= Cecil de Cardonnel, 2nd Baroness Dynevor =

Welsh peeress (1735–1793)

Cecil de Cardonnel
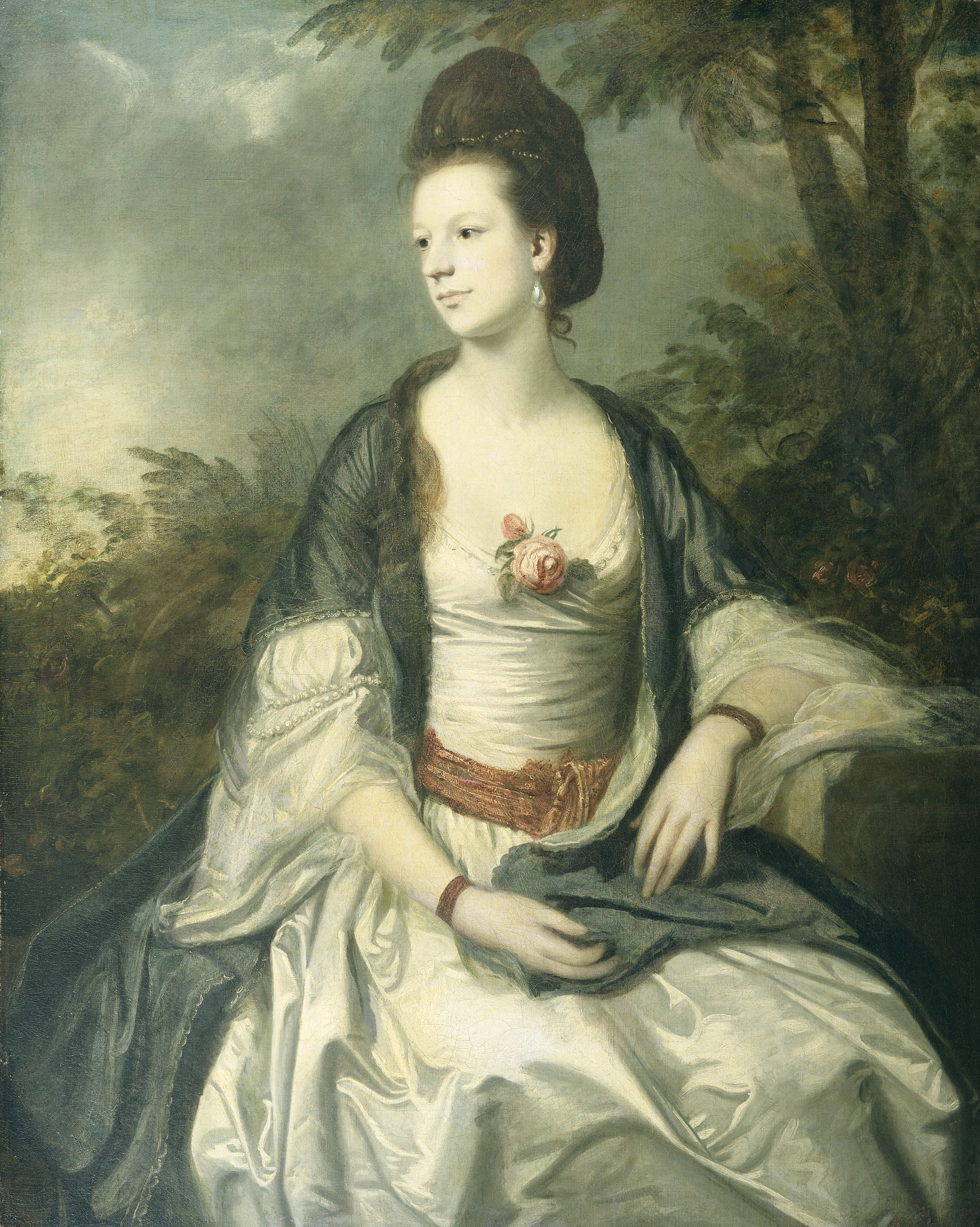
- Born: Cecil Talbot; 1735
- Died: 14 March 1793 (aged 57–58)

Cecil de Cardonnel, 2nd Baroness Dynevor (July 1735 – 14 March 1793) was a Welsh peeress.

== Biography ==
Born on July 1735, she was the daughter of William Talbot, 1st Earl Talbot. Her mother was the daughter and heir of Adam de Cardonnel, British Secretary of War. Under the special remainder in the creation of the barony for her father, she and her heirs male were entitled to inherit the Barony of Dynevor. He father was also the 1st Earl Talbot (a title that became extinct on his death) and 2nd Baron Talbot of Hensol. That title was inherited by Lady Dynevor's cousin, John Chetwynd-Talbot.

On 16 August 1756, she married George Rice. Rice was a Member of Parliament for county Carmarthenshire between 1754 and 1779 and Lord Lieutenant of Carmarthen from 1755 to 1779. Rice died on 3 August 1779. The widowed Lady Dinevor, took, by royal licence, the surname of de Cardonnel from 21 May 1787.

She succeeded to the title in 1782, upon the death of her father. She died on 14 March 1793, at Dynevor Castle, aged 57.

The title passed to her elder son, George Talbot-Rice who become the 3rd Baron Dynevor, resuming his paternal surname of Rice in 1827.

Peerage of Great Britain
Preceded by William Talbot	Baroness Dynevor; 1782–1793	Succeeded by George Talbot Rice
