= Dinefwr Castle =

Castle ruins in Carmarthenshire, Wales

Coordinates: 51.8768°N 4.0184°W

- Castell Dinefwr (Welsh) (Note: Since 2024, Cadw, who maintain the site, use the Welsh name only.)
- Carmarthenshire, Wales
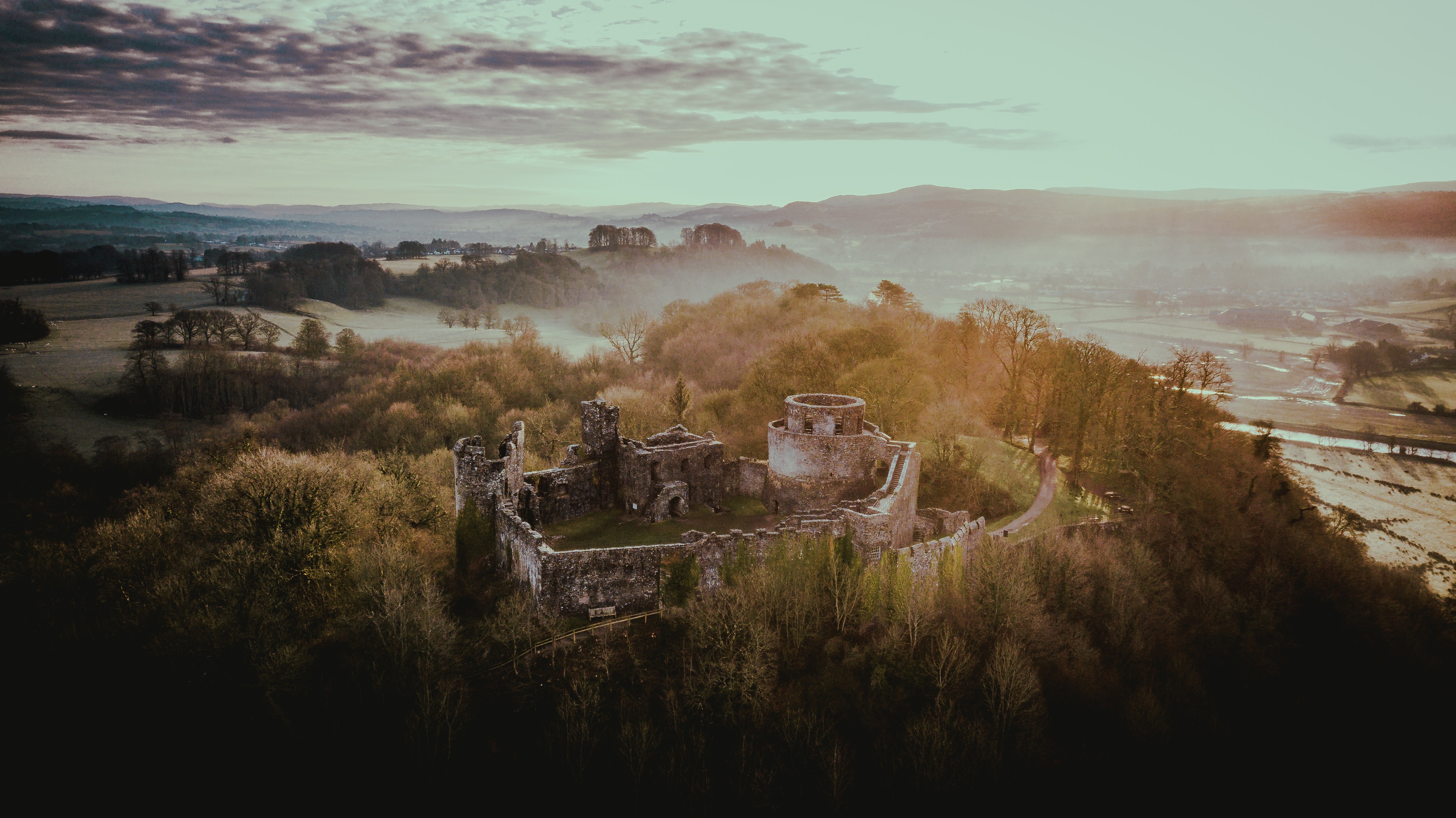
- The castle sits on a hill overlooking the Towy valley.

Site information
- Type: Castle
- Owner: Wildlife Trust of South and West Wales; National Trust (surrounding estate)
- Operator: Cadw
- Website: Dinefwr/Dynefor Castle Woods, Llandeilo (WTSWW); Dinefwr (National Trust); Castell Dinefwr (Cadw)

Dinefwr Castle (Welsh: Castell Dinefwr; also known as Old Dynevor Castle) is a ruined castle overlooking the River Towy near the town of Llandeilo, Carmarthenshire, Wales. It lies on a ridge on the northern bank of the Towy, with a steep drop of one hundred feet to the river. Dinefwr was the chief seat of the Dinefwr dynasty of the Kingdom of Deheubarth. The castle is a Grade I listed building.

== Description ==
The present castle is entered via a fortified entrance protected by a restored length of battlement. The short path from the car park gives an extensive view of the Towy valley. The door admits the visitor to the main space enclosed by the walls, from which there are several stairs to the main battlements and towers.

A narrow spiral staircase leads to a high tower, which gives extensive views of the deer park to the north and the Towy valley to the south and west. The castle keep is entered via the cellar at its base, but access to the circular walkway at the top can only be made via the battlement walk. Details such as the well and several garderobes are visible in the structure. There is a path around the base of the main structure to the north.

== History ==
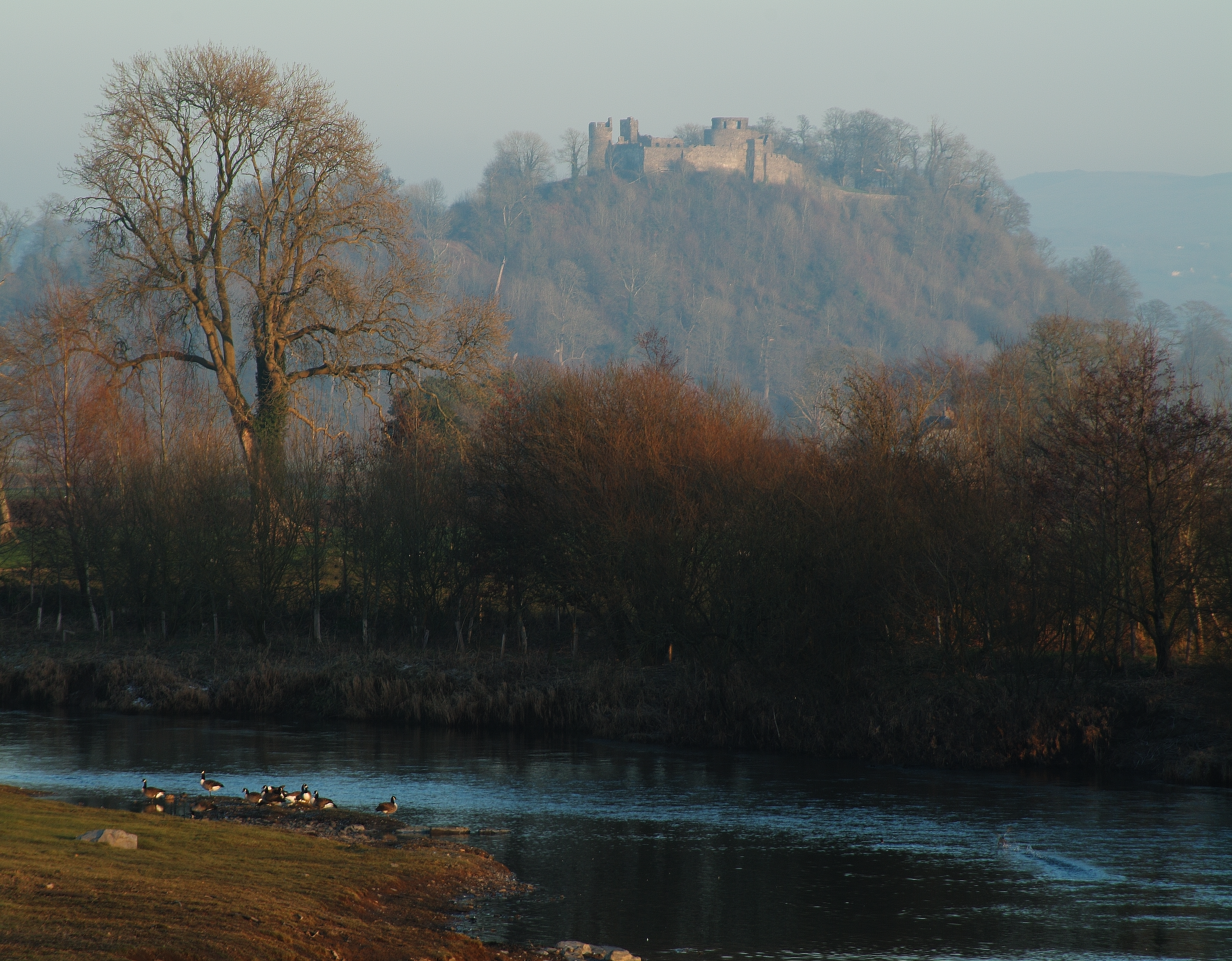
View from the river and the park

Tradition relates that a castle was first constructed on this site by Rhodri the Great, but no archaeological remains have been dated from this period. Dinefwr later became the chief seat of Rhodri's grandson Hywel Dda, first ruler of Deheubarth and later king of most of Wales. Rhys ap Gruffydd, ruler of Deheubarth from 1155 to 1197, is thought to have rebuilt the castle. Giraldus Cambrensis tells a story about a plan by King Henry II of England to assault the castle during a campaign against Rhys. One of Henry's most trusted followers was sent on reconnaissance, guided by a local Welsh cleric, who was asked to lead him to the castle by the easiest route, but instead took the most difficult route he could find, ending the performance by stopping to eat grass with the explanation that this was the diet of the local people in times of hardship. The planned attack was duly abandoned.

Rhys ap Gruffydd also built the spectacular castle at Carreg Cennen, about four miles away to the south. It is not visible from Dynefwr, but Dryslwyn Castle can just be seen on a hill blocking the Towy valley to the south-west. Rhys also founded two religious houses during this period. Talley Abbey was the first Premonstratensian abbey in Wales, while Llanllyr was a Cistercian nunnery, only the second nunnery to be founded in Wales and the first to prosper.

On Rhys ap Gruffydd's death the castle passed to his son Rhys Gryg, and the earliest parts of the present castle are thought to derive from this period. Llywelyn the Great of Gwynedd was now extending his influence to this area, and Rhys, finding himself unable to resist, dismantled the castle. Llywelyn however had it restored and held it until his death in 1240. In 1255 Llywelyn the Last gave Dinefwr to Rhys Fychan, then later gave it to Maredudd ap Rhys before later returning it to Rhys Fychan. Maredudd now allied himself to King Edward I of England, and his son Rhys ap Maredudd helped Edward capture Dinefwr in 1277. This Rhys had apparently been promised Dinefwr in return for his help, but Edward did not keep his promise and had Rhys executed in 1291.

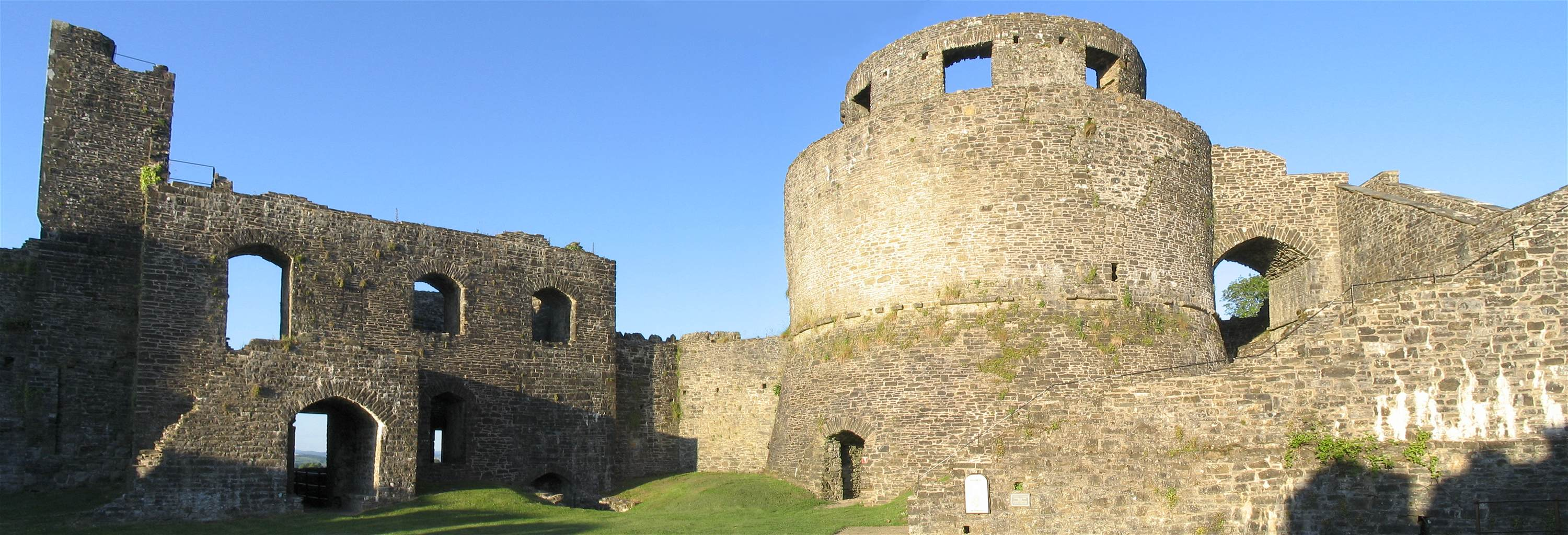
Dinefwr Castle, view on the tower and the grand hall, in the inner courtyard

The castle now came into English hands, though it is recorded to have been burnt during the rebellion of Llywelyn Bren in 1316. In 1317 it was given to Hugh Despenser, the king's favourite. It was unsuccessfully besieged by the forces of Owain Glyndŵr in 1403. Towards the end of the 15th century the castle was held by Sir Rhys ap Thomas, who carried out extensive rebuilding. In 1531 his grandson Rhys ap Gruffydd was executed for treason and the castle was confiscated by the crown, though the family were later able to recover it.

In 1660 Newton House was built nearby and the castle keep modified as a summer house. The remains of the large windows can be seen at the top of the keep, but it burned down in the 18th century. The castle is now owned by the Wildlife Trust of South and West Wales and managed by CADW on their behalf.

Since 2024, Cadw have used the Welsh name Castell Dinefwr in English, as part of an effort to standardise the names in both languages.

== Public access ==
The castle is now partially owned by the Wildlife Trust of South and West Wales (who do not charge for entry) and is managed by Cadw but lies within Dinefwr Park, which is owned by the National Trust. Visitors who wish to see the castle and are driving there, may park in the town and walk up to the Castle using the free Wildlife Trust of South and West Wales access route.

If visitors walk or park in the National Trust site and are not National Trust, Wildlife Trust of South and West Wales or Cadw members there is a site entrance charge. There is a small free car park near the castle for disabled badge holders, but it can only be reached by a rough track through a field. Permission can be gained at the National Trust office to drive over the field up to the castle, weather and conditions permitting.

== Gallery ==
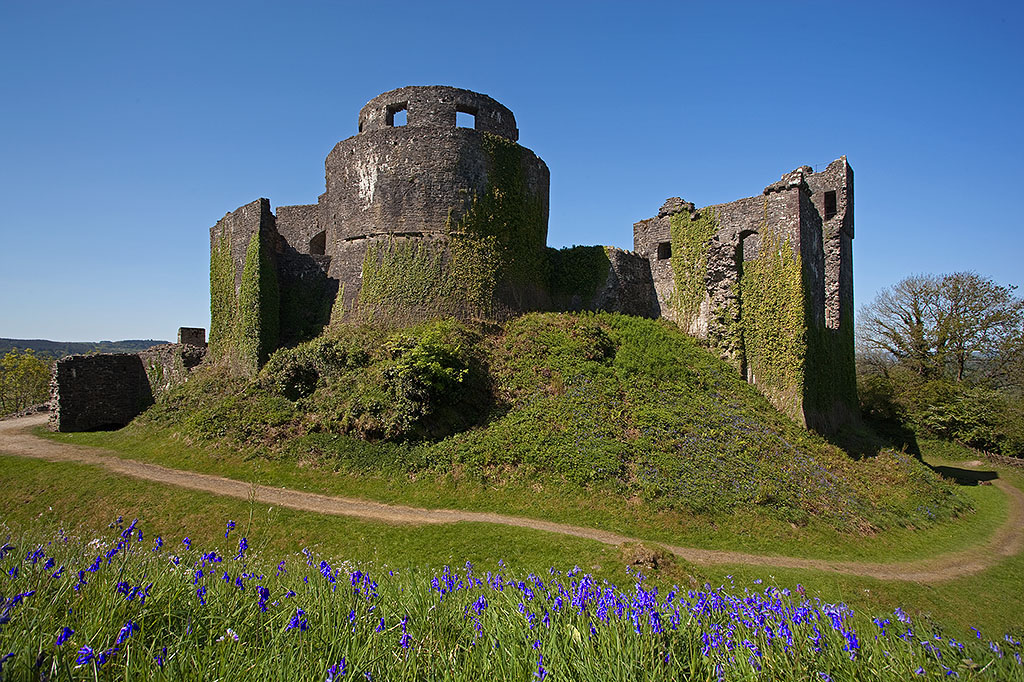
Tower entrance with flowers

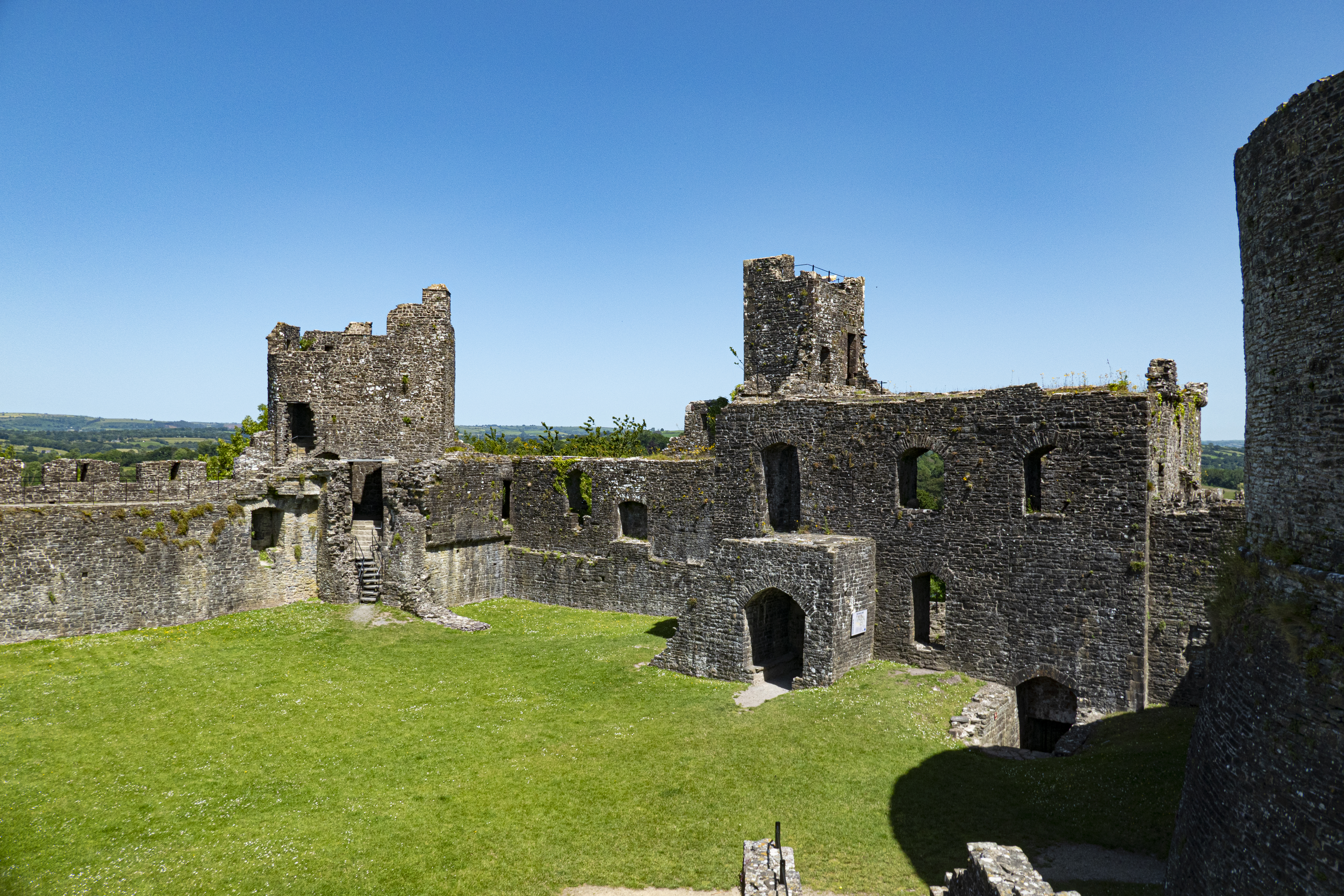
Inner courtyard during the day

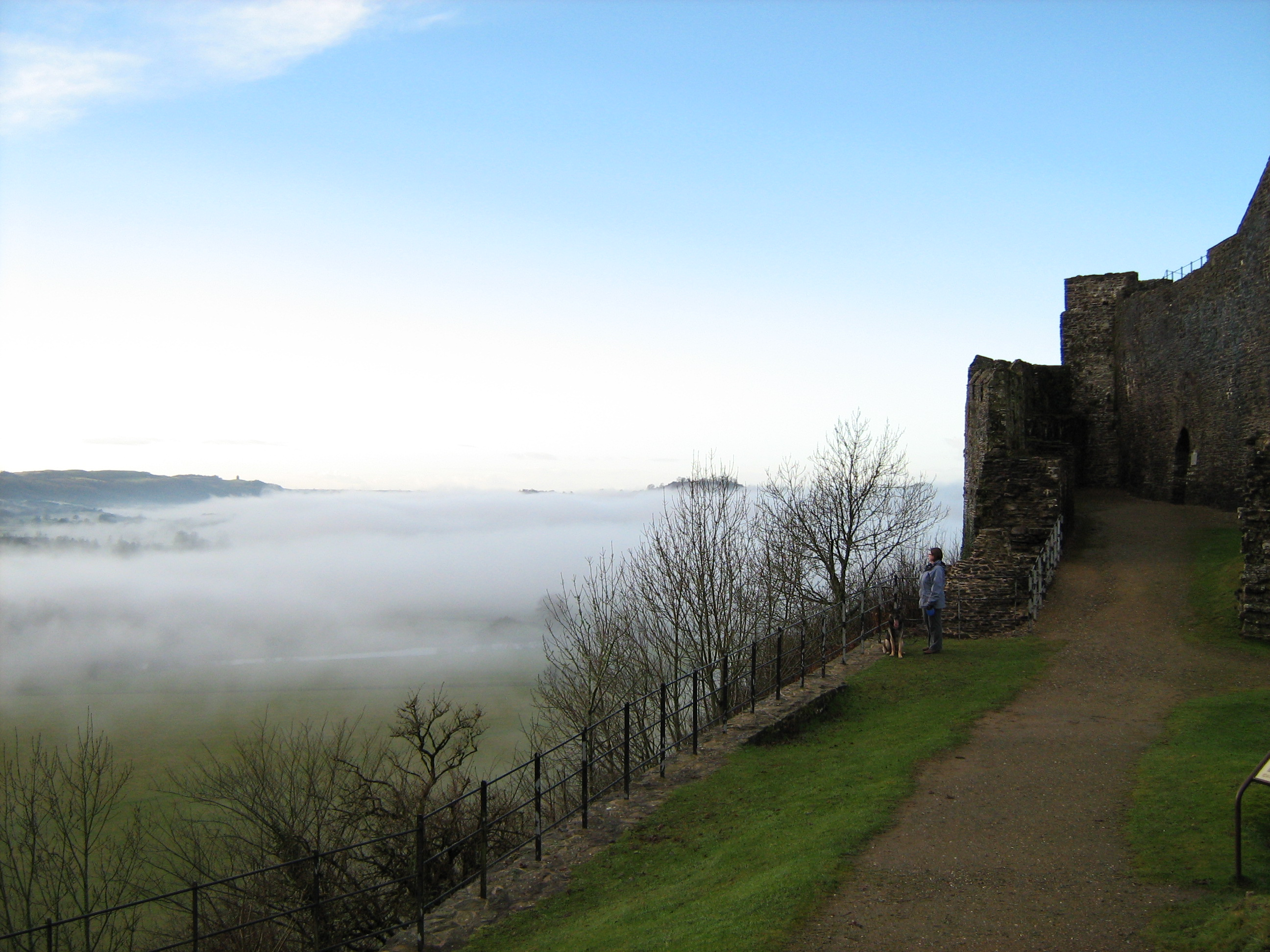
View over the clouds

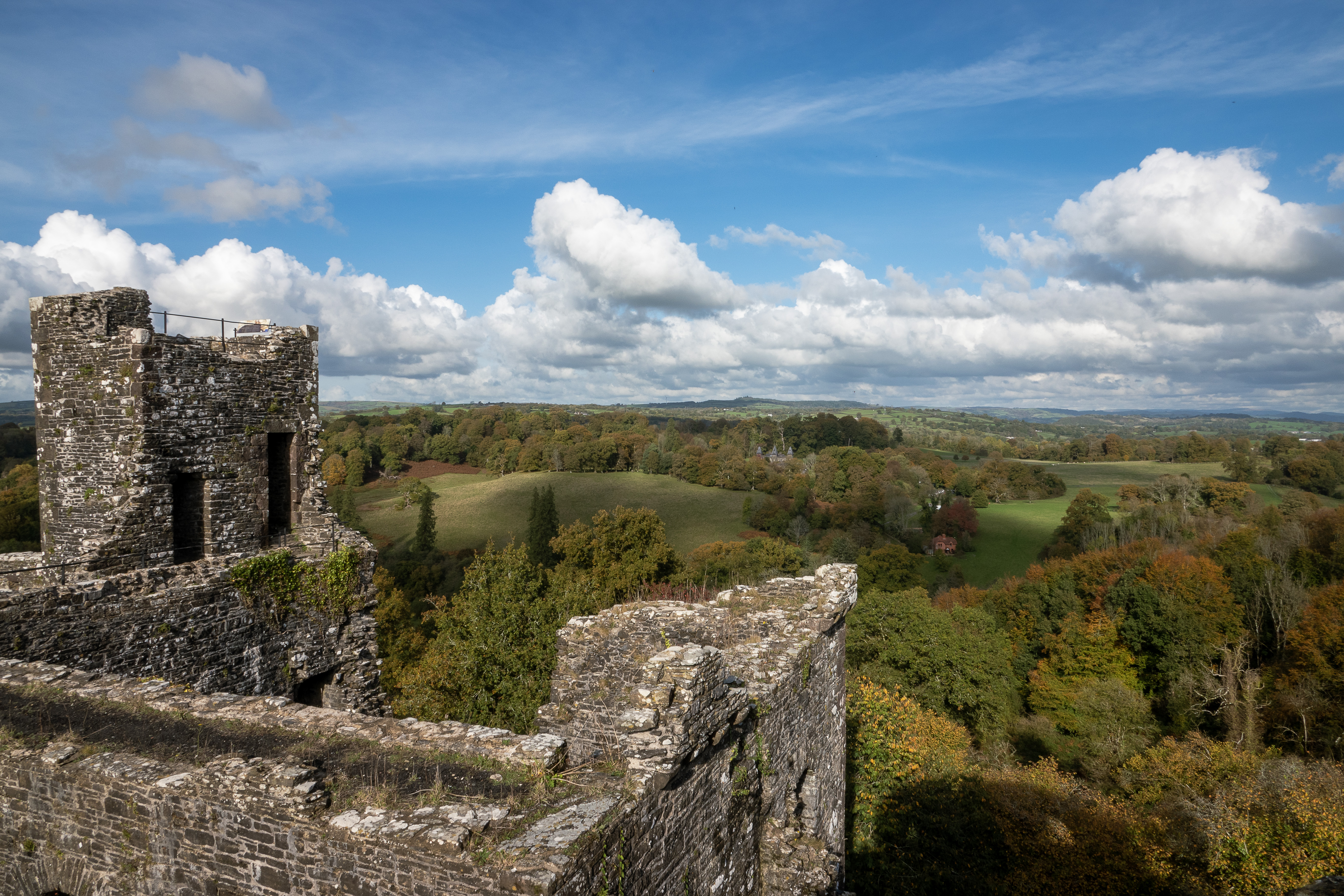
View over the Towy valley

== Bibliography ==
- Rob Gittins (1984) Dinefwr Castle (Gomer Press) ISBN 0-86383-032-3

== See also ==
- List of Cadw properties
- List of Castles in Great Britain and Ireland
- List of castles in Wales
- Grade I listed buildings in Carmarthenshire
- Grade II* listed buildings in Carmarthenshire
