= Bromsgrove railway works =

Bromsgrove railway works was established in 1841 at Aston Fields, near Bromsgrove, Worcestershire, England as a maintenance facility for the Birmingham and Gloucester Railway. However, as well as maintaining those provided by other manufacturers, it built one locomotive.

== Locomotive production ==
The railway's engineer James McConnell obtained the directors' permission in March 1844 to build a new locomotive for the Lickey Incline.

This followed a series of accidents on the incline. One involved a demonstration locomotive by William Church, called, unfortunately "Surprise". Its experimental boiler blew up, killing the enginemen, Thomas Scaife and Joseph Rutherford. Their decorative monuments are in St. Johns churchyard Bromsgrove (and have been restored in 2014), though the depiction of a locomotive on the tombstone is of one of the Norris Locomotives. Then a further boiler explosion on another loco killed William Creuze.

The company had been using American Norris 4-2-0s, which in fact lasted until 1856. The Americans made much of the fact that they were showing the British how to build engines, but they were expensive to import. Edward Bury had tried one of his London and Birmingham Railway engines in 1841 but its performance up the bank was less successful than that of an American engine because of the latter's undisclosed but much higher boiler pressure. Another locomotive that had been tried was Ysabel a 2-4-0 built by Isaac Dodds.

McConnell carried out a number of innovations, culminating in his locomotive built at Bromsgrove specifically for the incline, the "Great Britain", reputed to be the first saddle tank. It was completed in June 1845.

It was a six-coupled loco, weighing 30 tonnes, with outside cylinders and an oval boiler. Initially number 38, it was later renumbered 276, then rebuilt as a well tank in 1853, renumbered again as 300 and withdrawn in October 1861.

McConnell continued to seek higher standards in railway engineering. In 1846 he met with George Stephenson and Archibald Slate at Bromsgrove. It was at this meeting that the idea of the Institution of Mechanical Engineers came about.

In March 1847 McConnell transferred to the London and North Western Railway as superintendent of its southern headquarters at Wolverton.

== Later history ==
The works built only one locomotive and after the merger with the Midland Railway, such work was concentrated at Derby. However it became a well-respected wagon works, using components from Derby, apart from laminated springs which it fabricated itself. It became part of the LMS and, during World War II the Works Manager initiated a scheme for recovering timber and metal fittings for re-use as spares. After nationalisation in 1949 it remained busy with one of the highest productivity rates, but following a reorganisation of railway workshops, it closed in 1964, with the work being transferred to Derby.

== Sources ==
- This is Worcestershire, Reaching for new standards, Wednesday 18 February 2004
- Lowe, J.W., (1989) British Steam Locomotive Builders, Guild Publishing
- Baxter, B., (1982) British Locomotive Catalogue 1825-1923, Moorland Publishing Co.
- Hunt, David, (1997) American Locomotives of the Midland Railway, Wild Swan Publications.
