= Surprise (locomotive) =

19th-century British steam locomotive

The Surprise was a nineteenth-century British railway locomotive. It became notorious after its boiler exploded and killed several crew members during unsuccessful trials in the early days of the Lickey Incline.

William Church, the Surprise's inventor, is mainly remembered for his typesetting machine, but also experimented with locomotives. His 0-2-2 well tank locomotive, exemplified by the Surprise, featured horizontal outside cylinders at the rear. Dr Church had invented an expanding mandrel for fixing boiler tubes, and it was the first tank engine to have a multitube boiler. It used piston valves and eccentric motion.

The Surprise (named Victoria at the time) began trial runs as a ballast locomotive on the London and Birmingham Railway in January 1838, then transferred to the Grand Junction Railway. Notwithstanding its having reportedly achieved a speed of 60 miles per hour (97 km/h), it was never particularly successful.

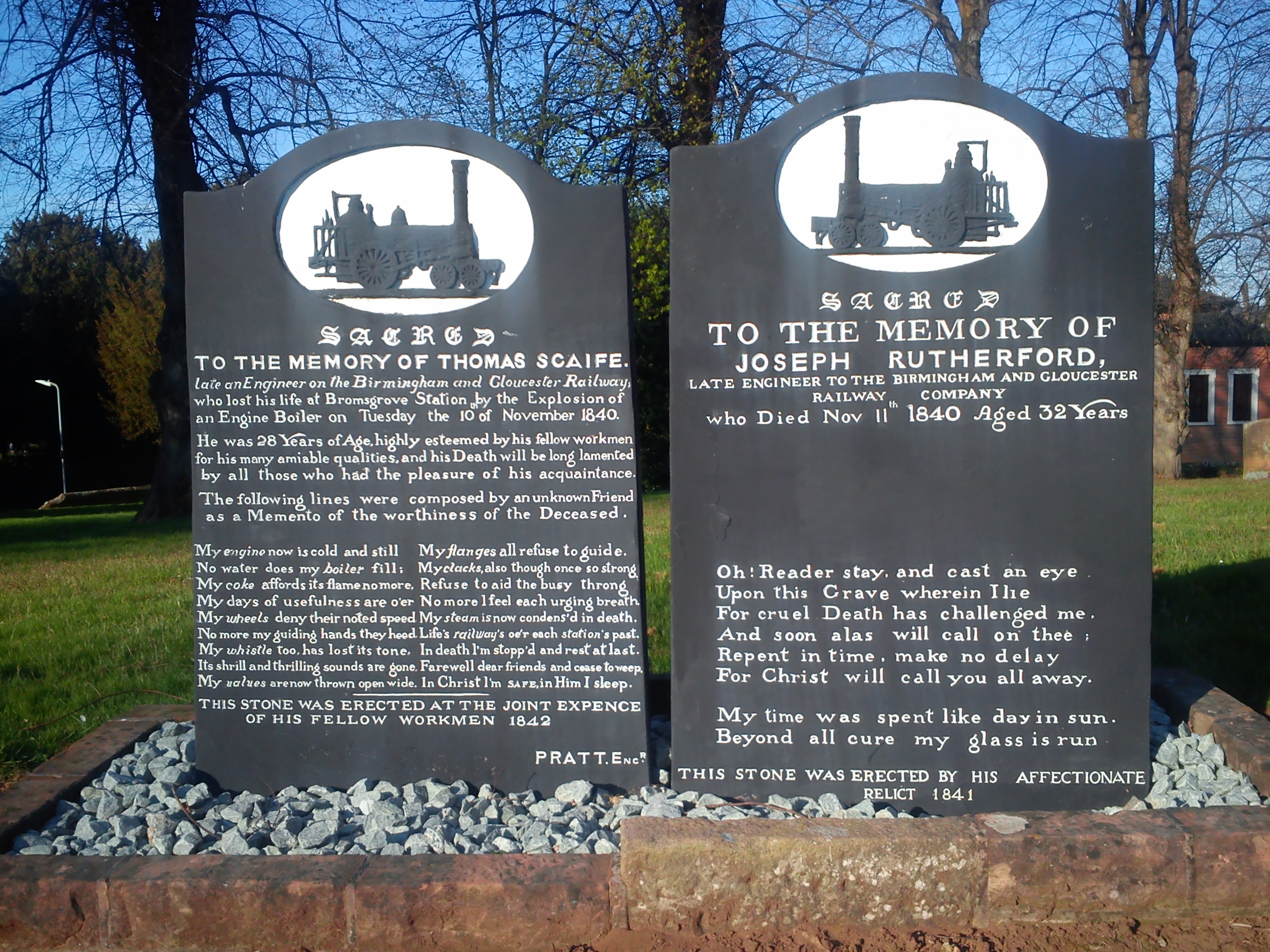
Scaife and Rutherford's tombstone at Bromsgrove

On 10 November 1840, when the Birmingham and Gloucester Railway was looking for engines to work the Lickey Incline, the locomotive, now called Surprise, was brought in, and its boiler exploded at Bromsgrove Station. Both crewmen, Thomas Scaife and John Rutherford, were killed and several people were injured. Their monuments are in Bromsgrove churchyard, though the depiction of a locomotive on the tombstone is of one of the Norris Locomotives.

A new boiler was later fitted and the locomotive was renamed Eclipse. In 1850, it was seen at Camp Hill railway station. By the late 1850s, it had been rebuilt as a six coupled engine on the Swansea Vale Railway.
