= Aston Fields =

Village in Worcestershire, England

Coordinates: 52.323301°N 2.048306°W

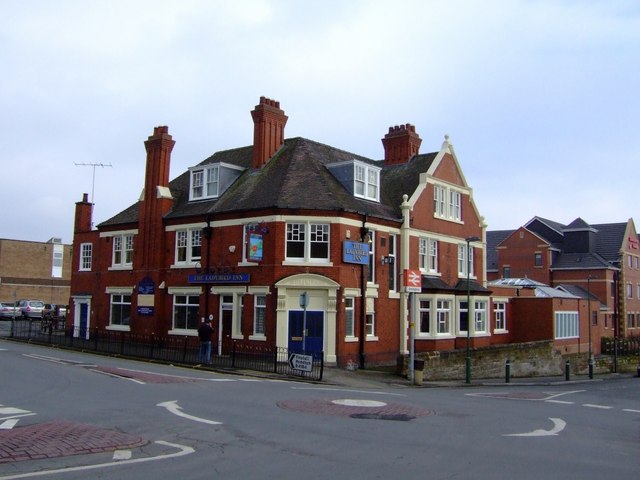

- Location within Worcestershire
- Population: 591
- OS grid reference: SO967694
  - London: 102 miles (164 km)
- Civil parish: Finstall
- District: Bromsgrove
- Shire county: Worcestershire
- Region: West Midlands
- Country: England
- Sovereign state: United Kingdom
- Post town: BROMSGROVE
- Postcode district: B60
- Dialling code: 01527
- Police: West Mercia
- Fire: Hereford and Worcester
- Ambulance: West Midlands

Aston Fields is a village in the district of Bromsgrove, Worcestershire, United Kingdom. It is situated to the south of Bromsgrove and is the site of Bromsgrove railway station. It was the location of Bromsgrove railway works, established in 1841, which was a maintenance facility for the Birmingham and Gloucester Railway. The works closed in 1964.
