= Stoke Works railway station =

Former railway station in Worcestershire, England

Stoke Works

General information
- Location: Stoke Prior, Worcestershire; England
- Coordinates: 52.2971°N 2.0864°W
- Grid reference: SO941666
- Platforms: 2

Other information
- Status: Disused

History
- Original company: Oxford, Worcester and Wolverhampton Railway
- Pre-grouping: Great Western Railway
- Post-grouping: Great Western Railway

Key dates
- 1852: Opened
- 18 April 1966: Closed
Location

Stoke Works railway station was a station in the hamlet of Stoke Prior in Worcestershire, England.

It was located on the Stoke Works Branch, which is still in operation carrying trains from Droitwich Spa to Bromsgrove. It was the only intermediate station on the line and was opened primarily for the workforce at the Stoke Prior Works. The works are no longer in operation and the car spelled the end for the station.

| Preceding station | Disused railways | Following station |
|---|---|---|
| Bromsgrove; Line and Station Open | Great Western Railway; Stoke Branch Line | Droitwich Spa; Line and Station Open |
| Dodderhill | Birmingham and Gloucester Railway | Bromsgrove |
