= Gilbert Talbot (soldier) =

English knight

Sir Gilbert Talbot
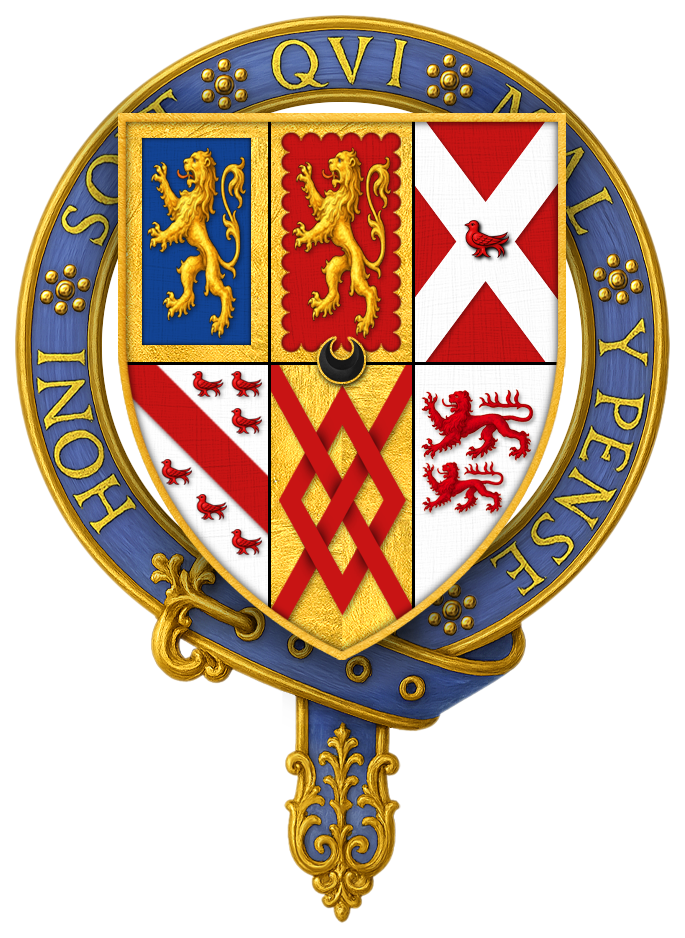
- Born: 1452; Grafton Flyford, Wychavon District, Worcestershire, England
- Died: 16 Aug 1517 or 1518 (aged 64–65); Northampton, Northampton Borough, Northamptonshire, England
- Occupation: Knight
- Parent(s): John Talbot, 2nd Earl of Shrewsbury (father); Elizabeth Butler (mother)
- Relatives: John Talbot, 1st Earl of Shrewsbury (paternal grandfather); William "Le Sire" Talbot (paternal great-grandfather)

Sir Gilbert Talbot of Grafton, KG (1452 – 16 August 1517 or 19 September 1518), was an English Tudor knight, and younger son of John Talbot, 2nd Earl of Shrewsbury and 2nd Earl of Waterford, and Elizabeth Butler.

== Life ==
Talbot was born sometime around 1452 to English nobleman and soldier Sir John Talbot and Elizabeth Butler. His father was killed at the Battle of Northampton when Talbot was 8 years old. He was a soldier, Knight of the Order of the Garter in 1495 and Lord Deputy of Calais in 1509, where he continued in a joint appointment with Richard Wingfield. Talbot supported Henry Tudor at Bosworth, where he commanded the right wing. He was given the Grafton estates in Worcestershire after Sir Humphrey Stafford was executed in 1486 for his part in the Stafford and Lovell Rebellion. Talbot was also given the honorary position of keeper of Feckenham Forest in 1492.

== Marriages and issue ==
=== First marriage ===
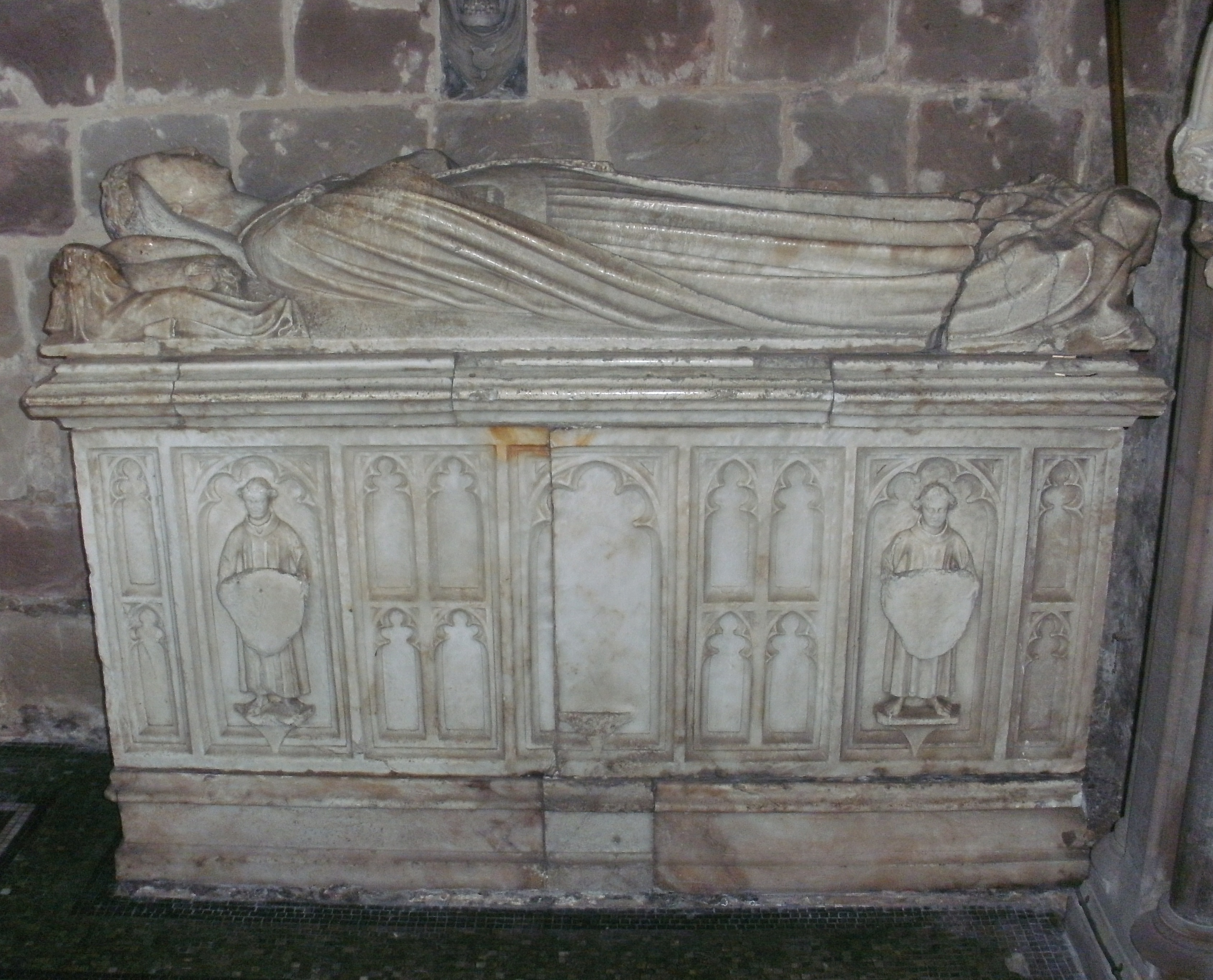
Tomb of Sir Gilbert Talbot of Grafton's first wife, Lady Elizabeth Talbot (née Greystoke, died 1490)

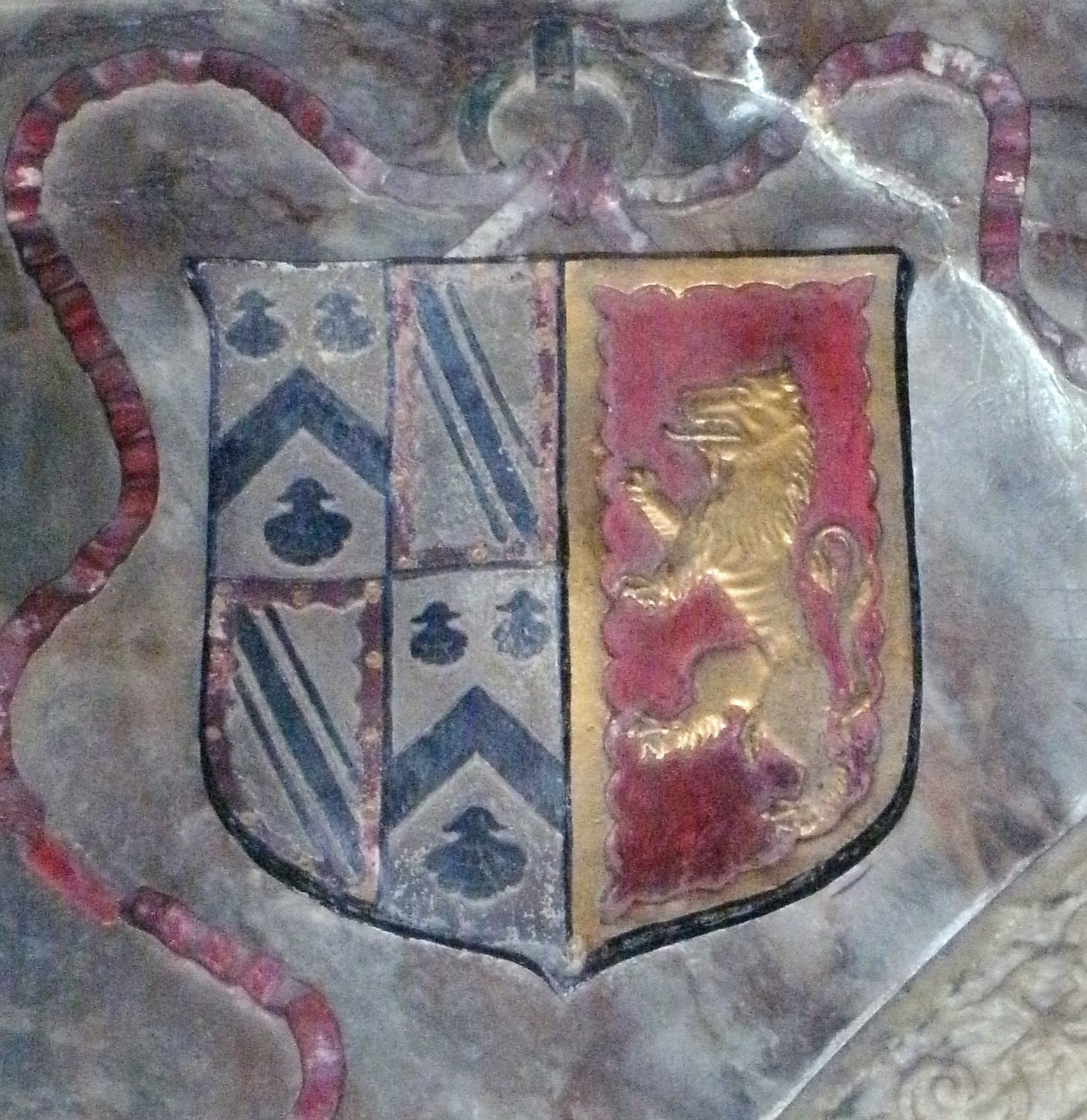
Arms of Sir Gilbert Talbot of Grafton's granddaughter Elizabeth as wife of Sir John Lyttelton

He married firstly Elizabeth Greystoke, daughter of Ralph de Greystoke, 5th Baron Greystoke and widow of Thomas Scrope, 5th Baron Scrope of Masham, and had three children:

1. Sir Humphrey Talbot, who died in the Holy Land.
2. Sir Gilbert Talbot of Grafton, Worcestershire (died 22 October 1542), married Anne Paston, daughter of Sir William Paston (died 1496) and Lady Anne Beaufort, daughter of Edmund Beaufort, 2nd Duke of Somerset, and had three daughters:
  1. Elizabeth Talbot, who married Sir John Littleton/Lyttelton, son of Sir William Lyttelton and his second wife, Mary Whittington, daughter of William Whittington, by whom he had seven sons and two daughters.
  2. Margaret Talbot
  3. Mary Talbot, who married Sir Thomas Astley of Patshull, and had two sons.
3. Eleanor Talbot, wife of Geoffrey Dudley, younger son of Edward Sutton, 2nd Baron Dudley and Cecily Willoughby, ancestors of the Dudleys of Russells Hall, Dudley, England.

=== Second marriage ===
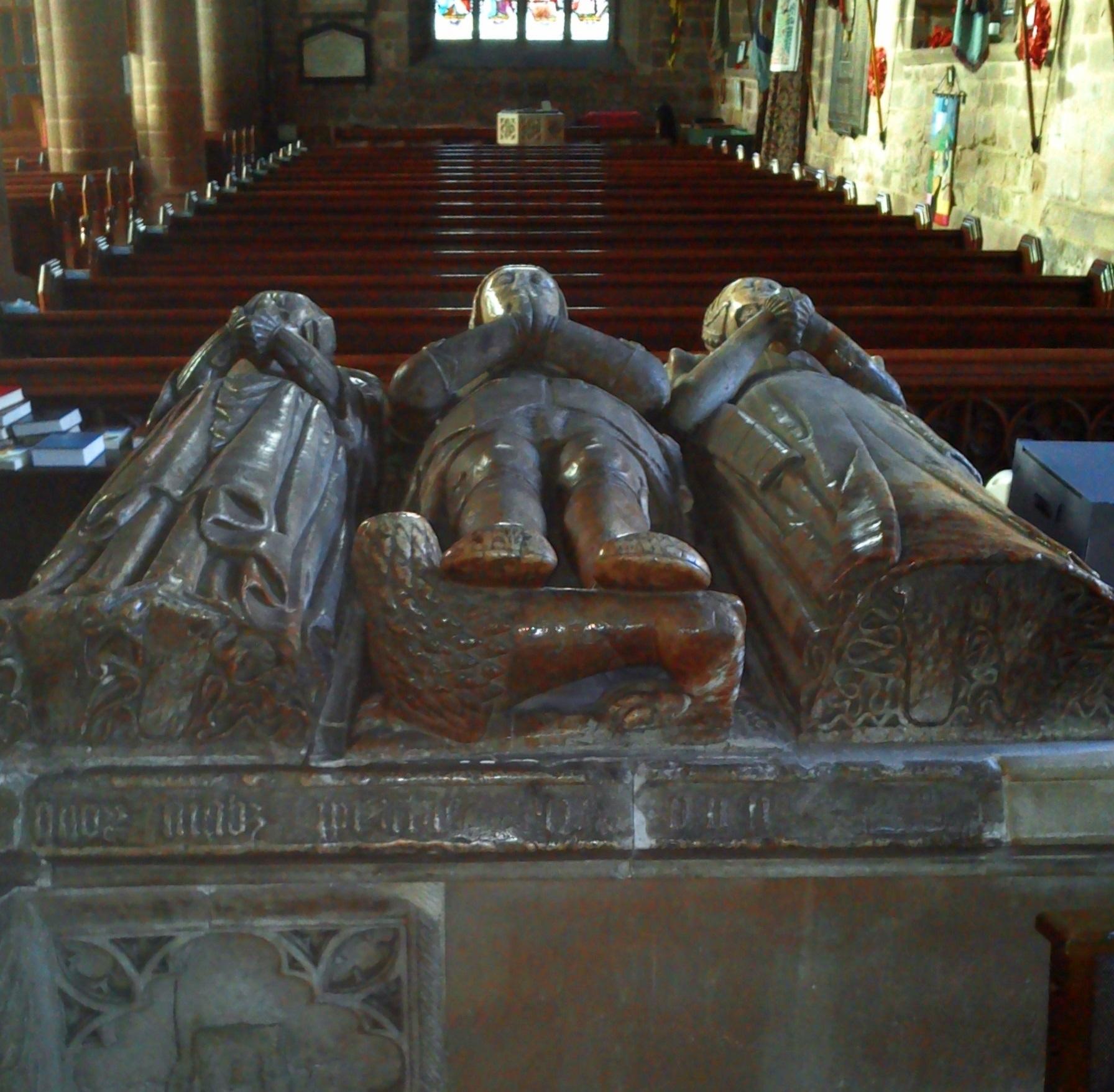
Tomb of Sir Gilbert Talbot of Grafton's son John and his wives in St John the Baptist Church, Bromsgrove.

He married secondly Etheldreda (called Audrey) Cotton, daughter of William Landwade Cotton of Landwade, Cambridgeshire, and had one child:

1. Sir John Talbot (c. 1485 – 22 October 1542 or 10 September 1549), lord of the manor of Albrighton, Shropshire and Grafton, Worcestershire. He married firstly Margaret Troutbeck, daughter of Adam Troutbeck of Mobberley, Chester, and had three sons and five daughters; he married secondly Elizabeth Wrottesley (died 10 May 1558), daughter of Walter Wrottesley of Wrottesley Hall, Staffordshire (died 1563), and Elizabeth Harcourt and had four sons and four daughters.
