= William Church (inventor) =

American inventor

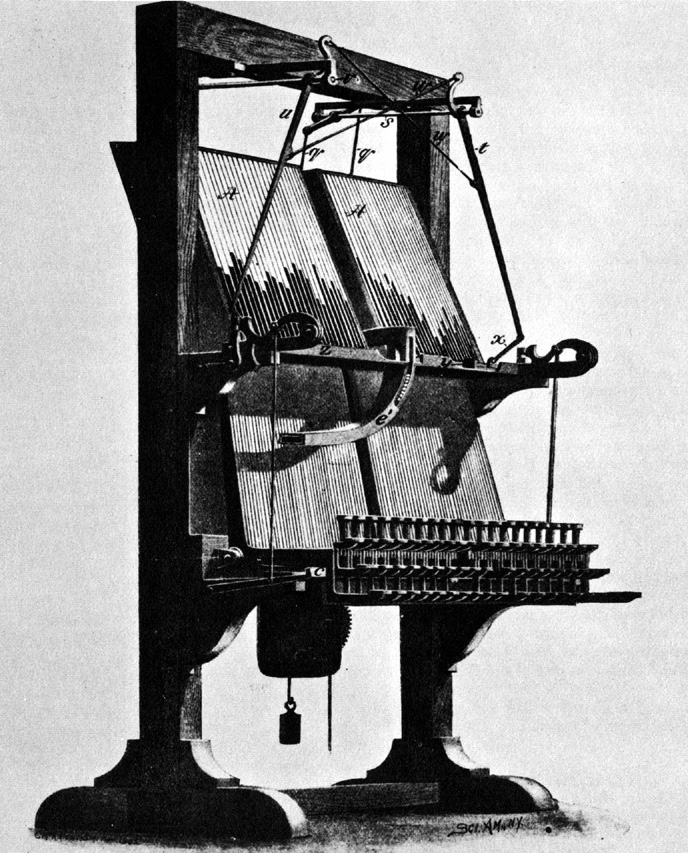
Church Typesetting Machine, 1903.

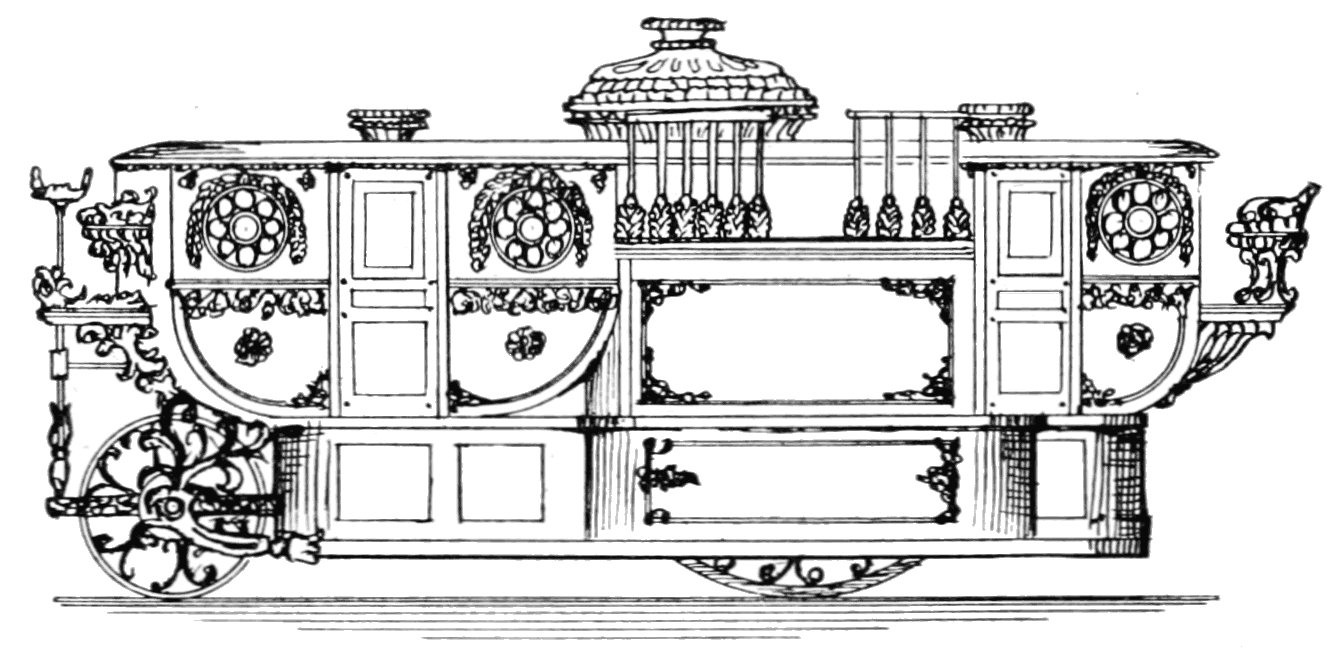
Side view of Church's proposed steam coach of 1832

Dr. William Church (c. 1778–1863) was an American inventor who patented a typesetting machine in 1822, generally considered the first.

While living in Boston, he patented the Church Typesetting Machine in England, consisting of a keyboard on which each key released a piece of type of the corresponding letter stored in channels in a magazine.

At some time after this, he moved to Bordesley Green near Birmingham in England, presumably to promote his patent. He was a prolific inventor, taking out numerous patents for methods of button making, nail making, metal working, smelting iron, spinning and other branches of engineering. In 1824 he patented a printing machine which positioned the paper sheets more accurately.

He turned his attention to steam engines, with a patent in 1829 for marine engines and associated equipment, and another in 1830 for an improved furnace. He patented his first steam carriage in 1832. This does not appear to have been built, but a further patent in 1835 led to the formation of the London and Birmingham Steam Carriage Company. The company prospectus describes their vehicle of 60 hp, capable of carrying a load of 15 tons at a rate of 15 miles an hour.

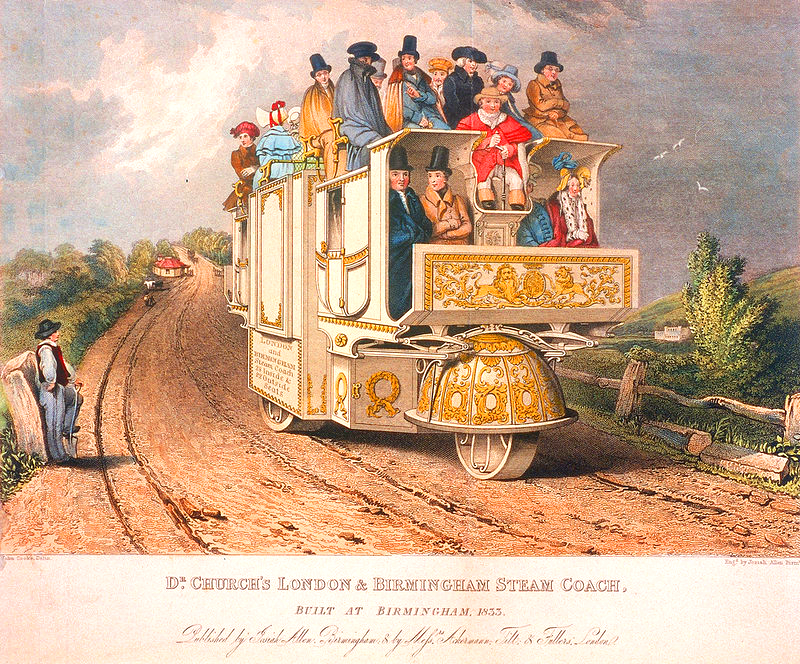
Church's steam coach on the road

The Science Museum has an engraving by Josiah Allen which shows it as a large three-wheeled vehicle with passenger compartments front and rear similar to conventional stagecoach bodies, with seating on top, and the driver mounted high at the front operating a tiller for steering. The central part contained the mechanism. It would seem however that this was not the vehicle which was eventually built. Although some accounts suggest that it operated on a daily basis between London and Birmingham, Prosser suggests that it never in fact completed a journey, and the company was wound up.

Although a number of steam powered coaches were tried between 1820 and 1840, they did not succeed. Operating on roads limited the weight of vehicles and required them to overcome poor surfaces and go up and down hills. Impediments from excessive tolls on the turnpikes to virtual sabotage were thrown in their way and prospective passengers were unnerved by being so close to the boiler. In the end, horse omnibuses won in towns and the railway, with its smooth running track, for greater distances.

In 1838 Church built a steam locomotive which had various names but was most notorious as the "Surprise" which was tried unsuccessfully in the early days of the Lickey Incline in England.
