= John Talbot (died 1549) =

English knight

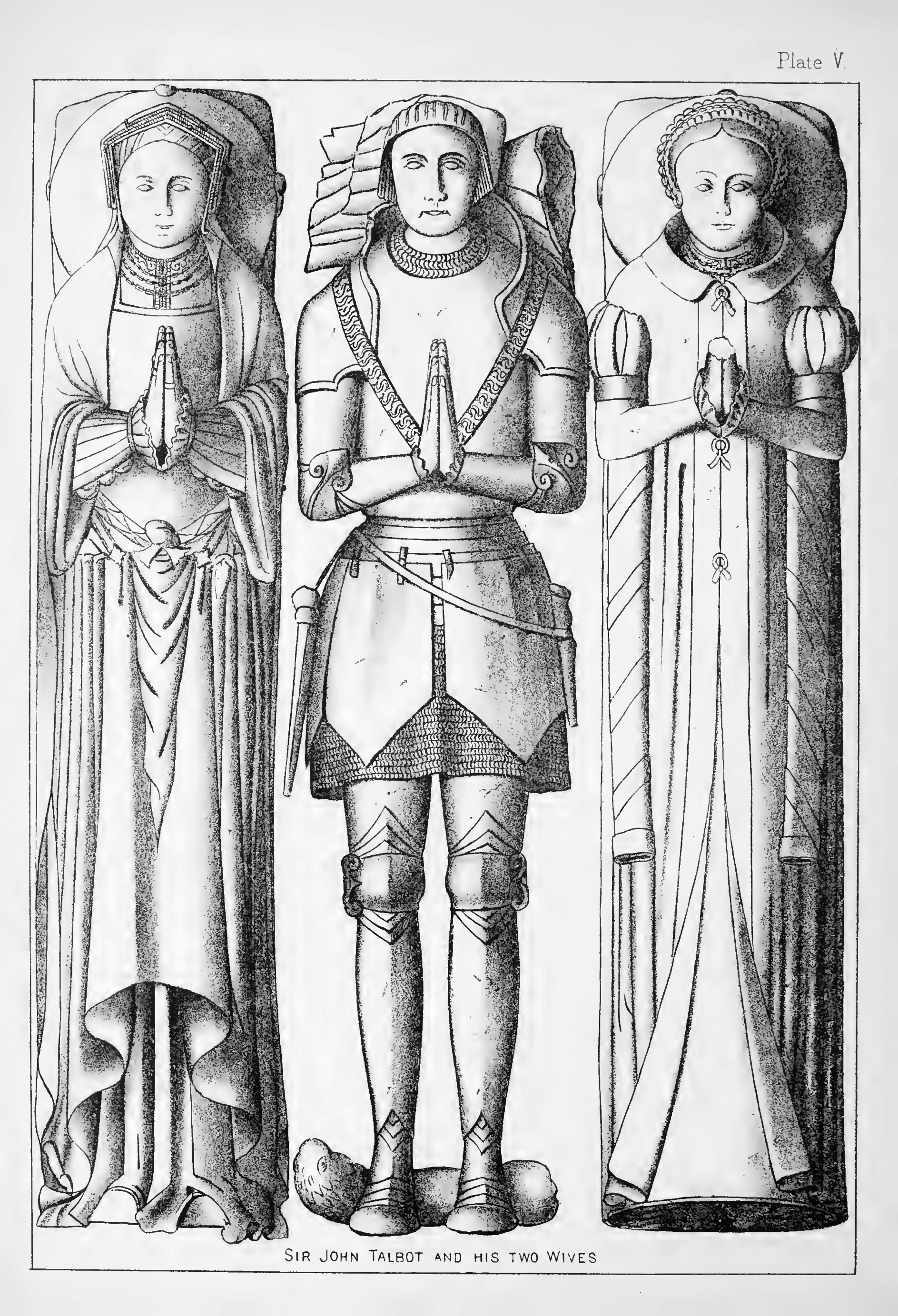
Drawing of effigies of Sir John Talbot and his two wives, St John the Baptist Church, Bromsgrove

Arms of Talbot: Gules, a lion rampant or a bordure engrailed of the last

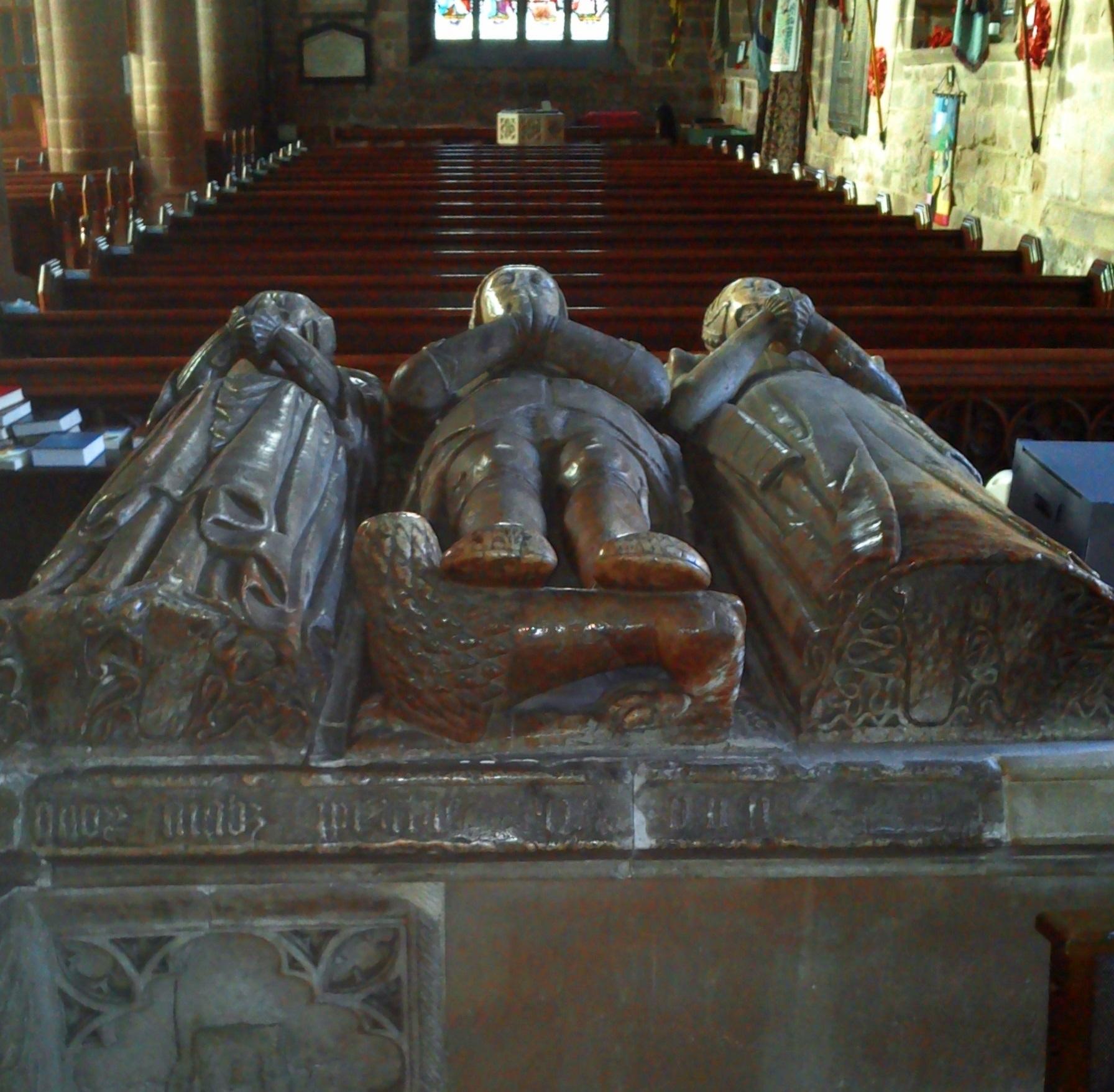
effigies of Sir John Talbot and his two wives, St John the Baptist Church, Bromsgrove

Sir John Talbot (c. 1485 – 22 October 1542 or 10 September 1549) of Pepperhill, Boningale, Shropshire, was an English knight and lord of the manors of Albrighton, Shropshire, and Grafton, Worcestershire.

== Origins ==
He was a son of Sir Gilbert Talbot (1452–1517/18), KG, of Grafton, the only child of his father's second marriage to Etheldreda/Audrey Cotton, a daughter of William Landwade Cotton of Landwade, Cambridgeshire.

== Marriages and issue ==
Sir John Talbot married twice:

=== First marriage ===
Firstly to Margaret Troutbeck, a daughter of Adam Troutbeck of Mobberley, Chester, by whom he had three sons and five daughters, including:

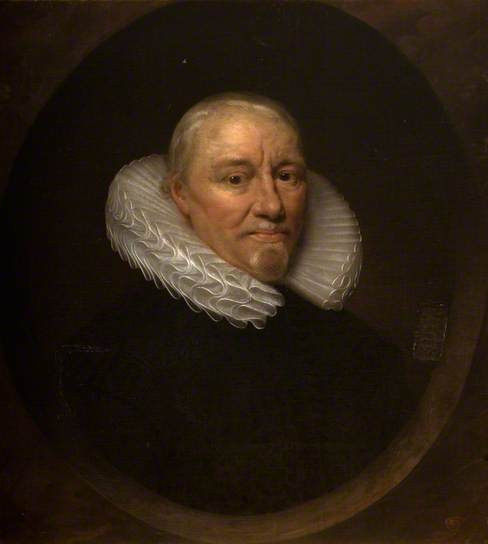
Sir John Talbot (1545–1611) of Grafton, a grandson of Sir John Talbot (died 1549)

- Sir John Talbot (died 6 June 1555), lord of the manor of Albrighton and Grafton, who married Frances Gifford, a daughter of Sir John Gifford (or Giffard), and had one son:
  - Sir John Talbot (1545–1611), lord of the manor of Grafton. He married Catherine (or Katharine) Petre, daughter of Sir William Petre, and had issue
- Anne Talbot (born 1515), married Thomas Needham (born 1510).
- Dorothy Talbot, married John Skyrmshire of Norbury, Staffordshire (died 1569), and had issue

=== Second marriage ===
Secondly he married Elizabeth Wrottesley (died 10 May 1558), a daughter of Walter Wrottesley (died 1563) of Wrottesley Hall, Staffordshire by his wife Elizabeth Harcourt. They had four sons and four daughters, including:

- Sir John Talbot (died 9 December 1581), lord of the manor of Salwarpe, Worcestershire. He married 13 September 1574 Olive Sherrington, daughter of Sir Henry Sherrington of Lacock, Wiltshire, and had four children:
  - Sherrington Talbot (died c. 1642) of Salwarpe, Worcestershire. He married firstly Elizabeth Leighton, daughter of Sir Thomas Leighton of Feckenham, Worcestershire, Governor of Jersey and Governor of Guernsey, and Elizabeth Knollys (born 1549), and had two sons, and married secondly Mary Washbourne, daughter of John Washbourne of Wichinford, Worcestershire, and had two sons:
    - Sherrington (or Sheringham) Talbot (died c. 1677), married 13 October 1627 Jane Lyttelton, sister of Sir Thomas Lyttelton, 1st Baronet, and had one son:
      - Sir John Talbot of Laycock, Keighley, Yorkshire. He married Barbara Slingsby, daughter of Sir Henry Slingsby, 1st Baronet, and had two daughters:
        - Anne Talbot
        - Barbara Talbot (c. 1671 - 31 January 1763). She married 11 July 1689 Henry Yelverton, 1st Viscount de Longueville
    - Sir Gilbert Talbot (died unmarried)
    - William Talbot (died 27 March 1686), of Stourton Castle, Staffordshire. He married Mary Doughty (died c. 1661), daughter of Thomas Doughty of Kinver, Staffordshire, and of Whittington, Staffordshire, and had three children:
      - Frances Talbot
      - Catherine Talbot
      - William Talbot, Bishop of Durham
    - George Talbot of Rudge, Shropshire, married and had one daughter:
      - Catherine Talbot
  - Thomas Talbot of Worvill, Shropshire. He married Magdalen Wyvill, daughter of Sir Marmaduke Wyvill, and had one son:
    - Robert Talbot of Worvill, Shropshire. He married Anne Sheldon, daughter of William Sheldon of Broadway, Worcestershire, and had three sons:
      - George Talbot
      - Thomas Talbot of Worvill, Shropshire
      - Gilbert Talbot
  - John Talbot (born between 1575 and 1581), of Badgworth, Somerset. He married Mary Trimnel, daughter of Thomas Trimnel of Okeley, Worcestershire, and had one son:
    - John Talbot (born after 1591), of Okeley, Worcestershire

== Death and burial ==
He and his wives Margaret Troutbeck and Elizabeth Wrottesley are buried in St John the Baptist Church, Bromsgrove, Worcestershire, where survives their effigies.
