= Blackwell railway station =

Former railway station in Worcestershire, England

Coordinates: 52.34478°N 2.01399°W

Blackwell

General information
- Location: Blackwell, Worcestershire; England
- Platforms: 2

Other information
- Status: Disused

History
- Original company: Birmingham and Gloucester Railway
- Pre-grouping: Midland Railway
- Post-grouping: London, Midland and Scottish Railway

Key dates
- 5 Jun 1841: Opened
- 18 Apr 1966: Closed
Location

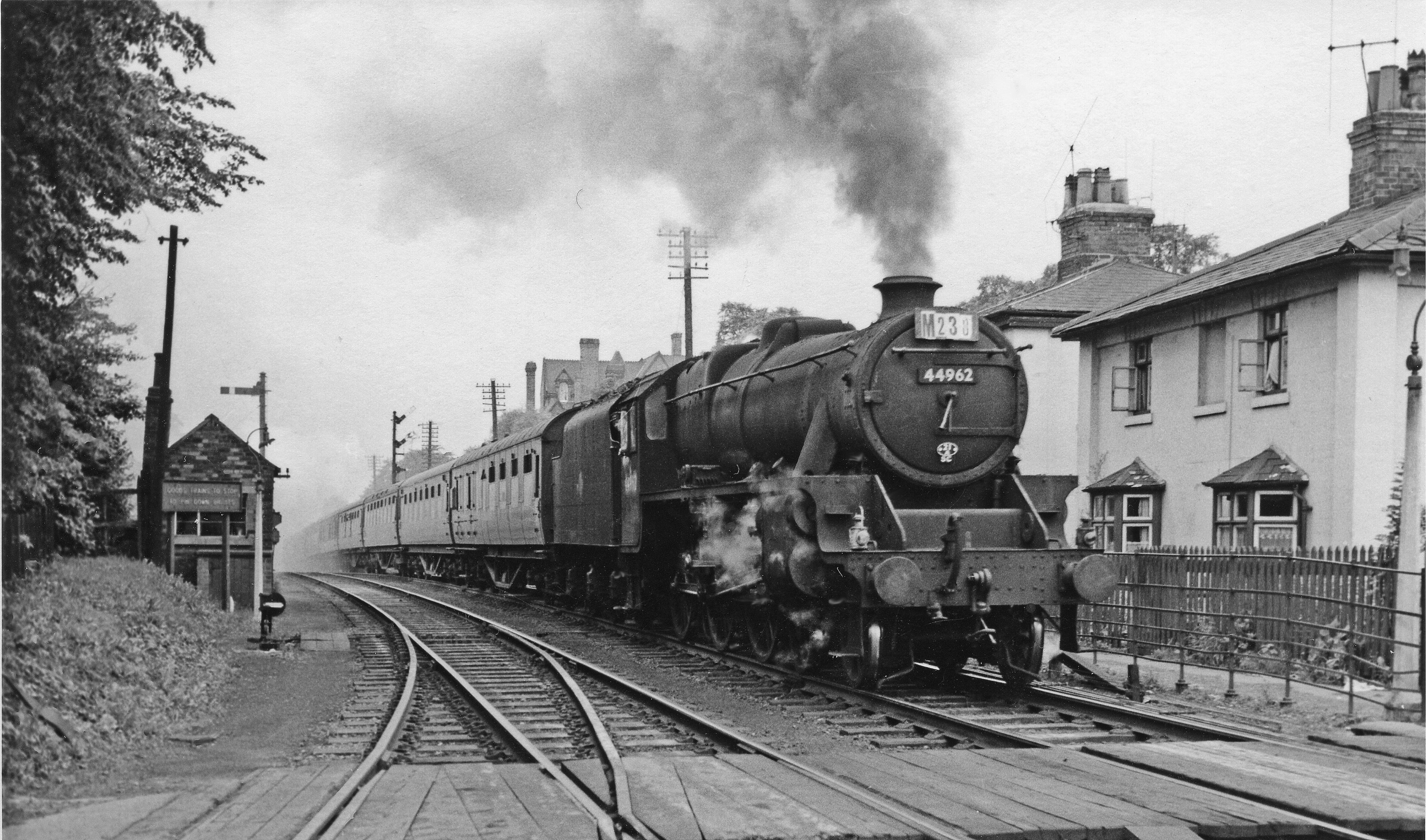
Blackwell: summit of Lickey Bank, with Up express

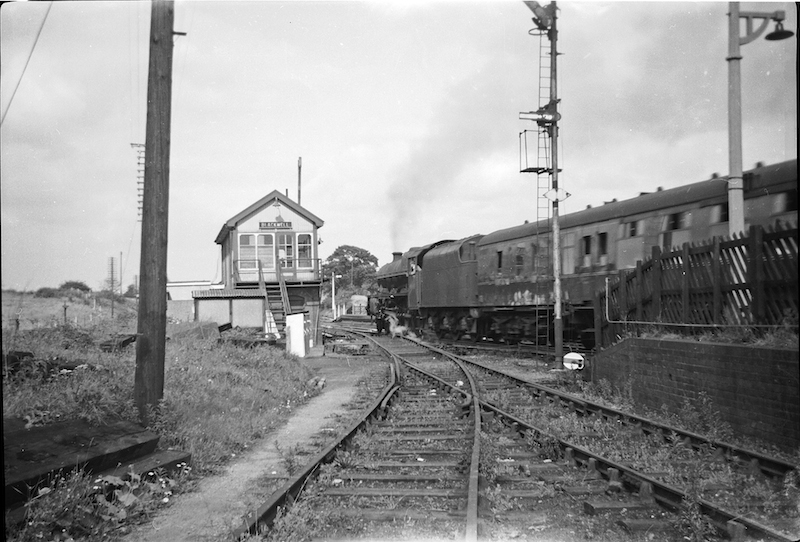
Blackwell station in July 1959

Blackwell railway station was a railway station serving Blackwell in the English county of Worcestershire.

== History ==
It was opened by the Birmingham and Gloucester Railway in 1841, a year after the line opened. In 1846, it became part of the Midland Railway, which had been formed two years before.

It was situated at the top and Northern end of the steepest part of the Lickey Incline and, slightly to the North, were the sidings where the banking engines would drop back from their trains and reverse, ready to return to Bromsgrove. In addition, trains travelling Southwards (downhill) would be brought to a stand at the head of the incline for a brake test, including, until 1941, passenger trains. In the days before through braking of goods trains, wagon brakes would have to be pinned down. Even later, when vacuum braking had been introduced, most trains would only be partly fitted and, often, a banking engine would have to lead the train to provide extra braking.

There were two platforms, that on the down (Southward) line being exceedingly long - much longer than that on the upside. Access to it was by a barrow crossing to the South, there being no footbridge. There were short goods sidings for each line running into bay platforms, with an extra one on the upside. The entrance and booking hall were on the up platform, with a small waiting room on the other side. Construction was of typical Midland Railway brick-built design, with wooden awnings.

At grouping, in 1923, it became part of the London Midland and Scottish Railway. The station closed in 1966. Although a few railway cottages still exist, the station itself has disappeared.

== Stationmasters ==
- William Buckingham ca. 1845 - 1877
- Thomas Clay 1877 - 1881 (afterwards station master at Croxall)
- G. Freeman 1881 - 1884 (afterwards station master at Fish Ponds)
- Richard Foskett 1884 - 1889 (formerly station master at Monsal Dale, afterwards station master at Borrowash)
- John V. Hawkins 1889 - 1898 (formerly station master at Sawley, afterwards station master at Sharnbrook)
- Charles Roughton 1898 - 1901 (formerly station master at Church Road, Birmingham)
- J.A.E Rainbow 1901 - 1905 (formerly station master at Shustoke)
- John Benjamin Tuffley 1905 - 1911 (afterwards station master at Alcester)
- Charles Henry Shill 1911 - ca. 1924 (formerly station master at Cam and Dursley)
- H.L. George from 1939
- Charles Harper 1947 - 1965

| Preceding station | Disused railways | Following station |
|---|---|---|
| Bromsgrove | Birmingham and Gloucester Railway | Barnt Green |
