= John Talbot of Grafton =

English politician (1545–1611)

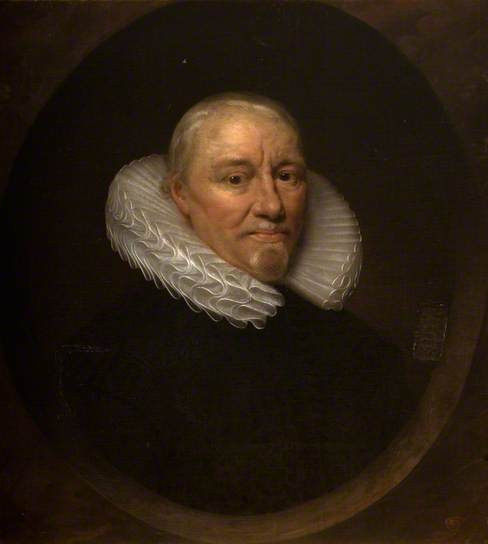
A portrait of John Talbot of Grafton said to be by Cornelius Johnson

Sir John Talbot of Grafton, Worcestershire (1545 – 28 January 1611) was a prominent recusant English Catholic layman of the reigns of Elizabeth I of England and James I of England. He was connected by marriage to one of the Gunpowder Plot conspirators, and by acquaintance or family ties to other important Catholic figures. He fell often under suspicion from the English government.

== Life ==
The descendant of an influential landowning family (his grandfather John Talbot (died 1549) was lord of the manor of Albrighton, Shropshire, residing at Pepperhill in Shropshire and Grafton), John Talbot became a member of Lincoln's Inn, 10 February 1555–6. He was member of Parliament for Droitwich in 1572.

It was when passing through Smithfield, London, in July 1580, with Talbot and his wife Katherine Petre, that Robert Johnson, the Catholic martyr, was recognized by Sledd, the informer. Robert Persons calls Robert Johnson "Mr. Talbot's priest", though, as it appears, he was, rather, Lady Petre's. Talbot was committed to the custody of the Dean of Westminster, 24 August 1580, and afterwards removed to the house of his brother-in-law, Sir John Petre, in Aldersgate Street. On 1 October 1581, the plague being then rife in the city, he was moved to some other house within ten or twelve miles of London.

In 1583 the priest, Hugh Hall, confessed that he had in past years been entertained by him. Later Talbot was restricted to the house of one Henry Whitney, at Mitcham, Surrey, and two miles round it. In 1588 he was imprisoned in Wisbech Castle for having heard Mass contrary to the provisions of the Religion Act 1580. From 9 December 1588 to about 13 May 1589, he was liberated on bail, owing to his own and his wife's bad health. He then seems to have been restricted to his house in Clerkenwell, London.

On 12 March 1589–90, he was ordered into confinement at the house of Richard Fiennes at Broughton, Oxfordshire, whence he was released on bail for a fortnight on 24 May 1590. He was again allowed out on bail on 20 December 1590, and 22 July 1591. In 1592 he was at "Bickslie" (Bexley or Bickley?) Kent. On 27 August 1592, the recusants formerly imprisoned at Ely, Banbury, and Broughton were ordered back to their respective prisons; but an exception was made (17 September 1592) in favour of John Talbot. However, the following year he was in Ely gaol. Thence he was liberated on bail for a considerable period to act as umpire in a family dispute.

Later on he was allowed to take "the Bathes", presumably at Bath, on account of his health. Between Michaelmas, 1593, and 10 March following, he paid £120 in fines for recusancy. Afterwards he was imprisoned in Banbury Castle, whence he was released on bail for two months, 27 February 1596–7, his leave being subsequently extended on 29 April 1597, and 6 November 1597.

In 1601 he was living in Worcestershire and pressure was brought to bear on him to secure his influence to promote the candidature of Sir Thomas Leighton as one of the parliamentary representatives of the shire. In 1604 he was paying £20 a month in fines for his recusancy, the benefit of which was on 26 August granted to Sir William Anstruther, who on 13 October in the same year obtained his pardon. On the following 8 December a warrant was issued for the release to him of £160, due from him to the Crown in fines for recusancy.

In 1605 he was suspected of complicity with the conspirators of the Gunpowder Plot, one of whom, Robert Wintour, of Huddington near Droitwich, had married his daughter Gertrude. Robert Wintour, however, declared that he had said nothing on the subject to his father-in-law, knowing that he would not join the plot under any circumstances. Indeed, he had actually driven the fugitive conspirators from his door when they arrived at his manor at Pepperhill. Talbot was, nevertheless, arrested, and on 4 December 1605, examined. On 26 September 1606, the value of his recusancy was granted to Lord Hay.

He probably died in 1607, or on 28 January 1611, and was buried at Albrighton.

== Family ==
He was the only son and heir of Sir John Talbot, of Grafton Manor, Worcestershire, and of Albrighton, Shropshire (died 6 June 1555), and wife Frances Giffard, daughter of Sir John Giffard, and grandson of Sir John Talbot of Albrighton (died 10 September 1549) by his second wife Margaret Troutbeck.

He was the father, by Katherine Petre, daughter of Sir William Petre and his second wife, Anne Browne, daughter of Sir William Browne, Lord Mayor of London, of three sons and three daughters, who included:

- Anne Talbot, married 18 November 1585 Thomas Hanmer (died 18 April 1619), and had issue, including Sir John Hanmer, 1st Baronet
- George Talbot, 9th Earl of Shrewsbury, a Catholic priest
- Gertrude Talbot, married Robert Wintour of Huddington, Worcestershire (executed 30 January 1606)
- John Talbot of Longford, Market Drayton, Shropshire (died London, in or around 1607), married Eleanor Baskerville, daughter of Sir Thomas Baskerville of Wolvershill, Herefordshire, and of Brinsop, Herefordshire, and had one son, John Talbot, 10th Earl of Shrewsbury
