= Grafton Manor =

Manor house in Dodford with Grafton, Bromsgrove District, England

Coordinates: 52.3206°N 2.0909°W

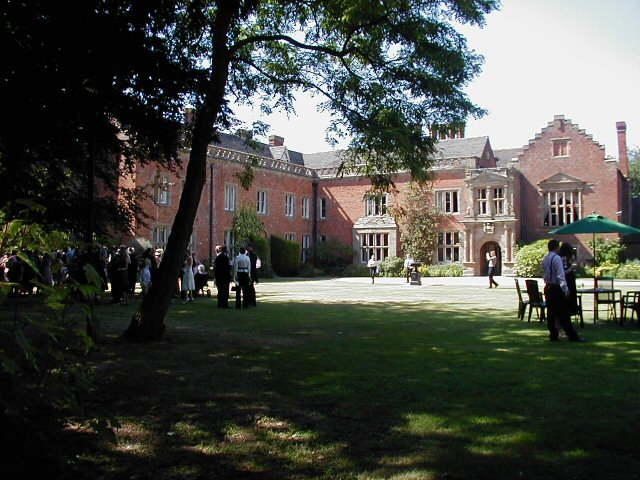
Grafton manor

Grafton Manor (13 miles north-east of Worcester and 2 1/2 miles south-west of Bromsgrove, Worcestershire) was established before the Norman Conquest. Grafton means "settlement at or near the wood" and may indicate a role in woodland management within a larger estate, for instance.

For a time, in the reigns of Henry II to Edward I, it was subject to forest law as part of the Forest of Feckenham.

The Lords of the Manor were influential figures in medieval and early modern Worcestershire, with a number becoming High Sheriffs or Members of Parliament for Worcestershire. A few were also national figures, especially the Talbots and Earls of Shrewsbury. Grafton was connected with Catholic worship in the County after the Reformation.

The house is now a listed building in the modern Civil parish of Dodford with Grafton in the Bromsgrove District of Worcestershire.

== Manor house ==
The current L-shaped building dates to the early 1500s and was extensively altered around 1567. A fire in 1710 destroyed parts, and restoration work took place in 1860 by David Brandon and in the later 20th century.

Above the parlour window, there is an inscription:

Plenti and grase
ti in this plase
whyle even man is plesed in his degre
there is both pease and uniti.
Salaman saith there is none acorde
when every man would be a lorde.

== St Michael's Chapel ==
The adjacent Chapel, originally annexed to the Parish of Bromsgrove, was granted by the Bishop of Worcester, William of Blois to the sacrist of St. Mary's, Worcester, who had to burn a taper before King John's tomb in Worcester Cathedral. Disputes are recorded over the inheritance of the revenues (advowson) and the costs of maintenance that took place between John de Grafton family and the sacrist of St Mary’s. Eventually, the advowson was in the hands of the Stafford family at Grafton, and was passed to the Talbot family.

The chapel was the “headquarters of a Roman Catholic mission” and there is a small burial ground next to it. It was disused and ruined by the end of the 1700s.

== Occupants and Lords of the Manor ==
Members of the families holding the manor are frequently listed as holding positions as local MPs and as the High Sheriff of Worcestershire.

=== Pre-Norman Conquest ===
The manor was held of Earl Edwin by five thegns who had to support the Lord of the Manor.

=== Norman period ===
In 1086, the manor was held by a man called Roger, from Urse d'Abetot. During the next centuries, a number of men bearing the name ‘de Grafton’ are mentioned in records, including Henry de Grafton in 1166, Richard de Grafton in 1166-7, Ralph de Grafton in the reign of King John, followed by two Johns. Edmund de Grafton is noted in 1315, followed by his son John (1349–50). John’s son Roger granted the manor to Thomas Beauchamp, Earl of Warwick in 1350-51. By 1367–8 John de Hastings had the manor, passing it to his daughter Maud, who married Ralph Stafford.

Edmund de Grafton represented the two member Worcestershire constituency in the early House of Commons of England four times.

=== Stafford family ===
Ralph Stafford died in 1409-10, leaving the manor to his and Maud’s son Humphrey Stafford. Humphrey is mentioned in 1401 when a warrant for his arrest was issued.

His son John Stafford held the manor between 1419–22, and also inherited Upton Warren. His brother, Humphrey, inherited. He and his brother William died leading the fight against Jack Cade's Rebellion in Kent and both can be identified as characters in Shakespeare's play, Henry VI, Part 2. Cade took the armour and clothes of Humphrey as his own.

Sir Humphrey Stafford inherited Grafton and Upton Warren in 1449–50. He appears to have been accused of attacking the Harcourt family in 1450 and a warrant issued for his arrest.

After fighting at the Battle of Bosworth with Richard III, Sir Humphrey Stafford broke sanctuary and supported Viscount Lovell in a further rebellion. He was executed for treason on 8 July 1486 at Tyburn by Henry VII.

The Staffords also represented Worcestershire in the House of Commons.

=== Talbot family ===
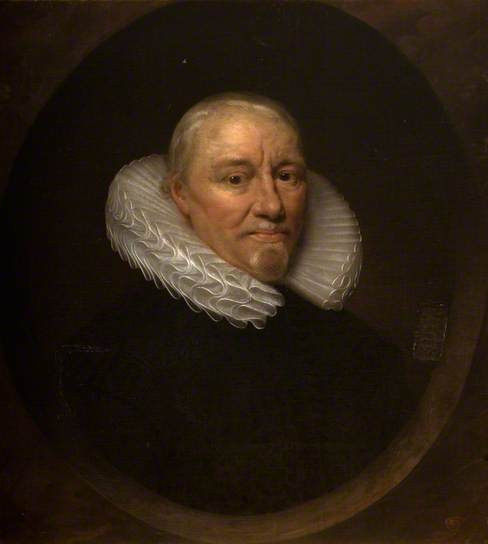
A portrait of Sir John Talbot (died 1611) said to be by Cornelius Johnson

Grafton and Upton Warren were given to a branch of the Talbot family close to the Earls of Shrewsbury. Sir Gilbert Talbot held them until he died in 1517; he also held a position as Keeper of Feckenham Forest. The manor passed to his sons Gilbert (died 1542) and then John (died 1549). John's son John (died 1555) held the estate next, after which it passed to the latter's son, John (died 1611), who became a famous recusant and was suspected of involvement in the Gunpowder Plot as his daughter Gertrude was married to Robert Wintour, one of the plotters.

In 1618, George Talbot succeeded to the title Earl of Shrewsbury. The Earls of Shrewsbury had or acquired other country residences, including Barlow Woodseats Hall (sold in the mid-1600s), Heythrop Park (developed as the family’s main seat in the early 1700s) and Alveton Lodge (rebuilt as the family seat in the 1800s).

John Talbot, 10th Earl of Shrewsbury played a role in the English Civil Wars. His son, Francis Talbot was active in the war in Worcestershire, on its Committee of Safety. Nevertheless, the presence of prominent Catholics such as the Talbots in the military affairs of Worcestershire created disquiet and resentment within the county. In 1646-7, bands of Clubmen formed in the west of Worcestershire, with the intention of driving away any armed forces from their lands, to resist despoliation and requisitioning. Their proclamation stated that they would not obey any Papist or Papist Recusant, "nor ought [they] … be trusted in any office of state, justice, or judicature".

In the third war, Francis Talbot joined King Charles II's mostly Scottish troops at the Battle of Worcester. He raised a troop of horse, which proved vital in helping Charles II escape the city when he was defeated by Cromwell's New Model Army. His father John is said to have accompanied Charles during his escape.

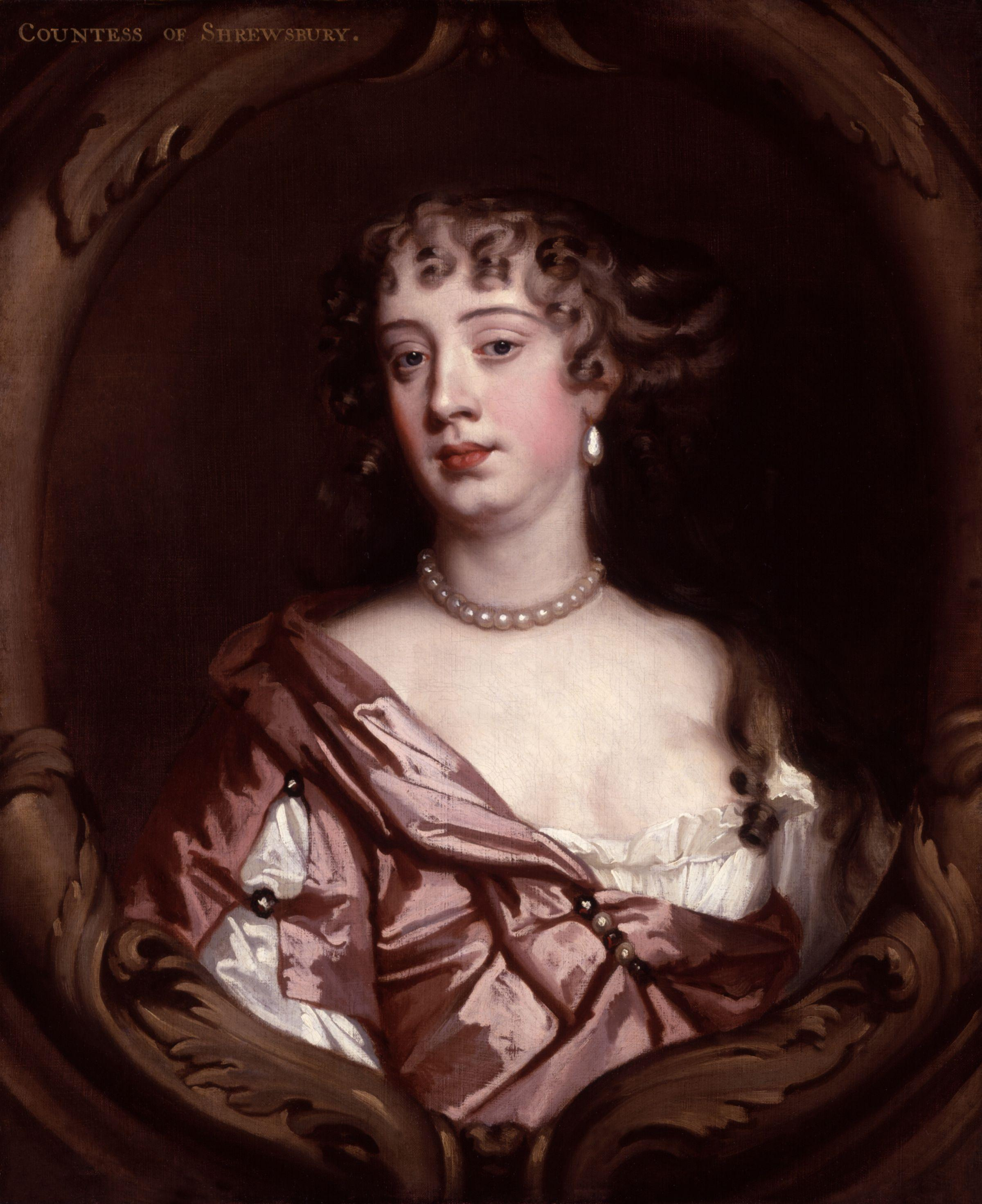
Anna Maria (Brudenell), Countess of Shrewsbury, Peter Lely, c.1670

After the restoration, Francis died as the result of a duel at Barn Elms with the Duke of Buckingham over his wife, Anna Talbot, Countess of Shrewsbury. Samuel Pepys related that:

from the whole house the discourse of the duell yesterday between the Duke of Buckingham, Holmes, and one Jenkins, on one side, and my Lord of Shrewsbury, Sir John Talbot, and one Bernard Howard, on the other side: and all about my Lady Shrewsbury, who is a whore, and is at this time, and hath for a great while been, a whore to the Duke of Buckingham. And so her husband challenged him, and they met yesterday in a close near Barne-Elmes, and there fought: and my Lord Shrewsbury is run through the body, from the right breast through the shoulder: and Sir John Talbot all along up one of his armes; and Jenkins killed upon the place, and the rest all, in a little measure, wounded. This will make the world think that the King hath good councillors about him, when the Duke of Buckingham, the greatest man about him, is a fellow of no more sobriety than to fight about a whore.
... The whole House full of nothing but the talk of this business; and it is said that my Lord Shrewsbury's case is to be feared, that he may die too; and that may make it much the worse for the Duke of Buckingham: and I shall not be much sorry for it, that we may have some sober man come in his room to assist in the Government.

He was succeeded by Charles Talbot, 12th Earl of Shrewsbury, who served several English monarchs and was created Duke of Shrewsbury in 1694. He built Heythrop Park, which became the family’s main residence. The dukedom became extinct at his death in 1718, and his successors as owners of Grafton reverted to the title of Earl of Shrewsbury.

When the earldom and property passed to Henry Chetwynd-Talbot, 18th Earl of Shrewsbury in 1860, Ingestre Hall and other properties became part of the estate.

It is unclear how much use was made of Grafton by the Talbot family at that time. The estates and titles to the Manors of Grafton and Upton Warren stayed with the Earls of Shrewsbury until the early 20th century, who owned other properties including Alton Towers, which, like Grafton, was sold. The Earls also owned Heythrop Park until a fire in 1831.

=== Alfred Murray-Willis ===
Grafton Manor house was sold in 1934 to Alfred Murray-Willis.

The building was certainly used as a hotel during the Second World War years.

=== Morris family ===
The building was sold to the Morris family in the mid-1940s. It was used as a long term residential letting until becoming a restaurant in the 1980s. Grafton Manor is now a 14 room hotel, hosting weddings and events.

== Sources ==
- Anon (1986). "Grafton Manor and Chapel Adjoining to South West: Grade II* Listed Building". British Listed Buildings. good-stuff.uk.
- Willis Bund, John William; Doubleday, Herbert Arthur; Page, William, eds. (1913). "Parishes: Grafton Manor". A History of the County of Worcester. Vol. 3. London: Victoria County History. pp. 123–127.
- Watts, Victor Ernest, ed. (2004). The Cambridge Dictionary of English Place-Names. Cambridge University Press. ISBN 9781107196896.
- Atkin, Malcolm (2004). Worcestershire under arms. Barnsley: Pen and Sword. ISBN 1-84415-072-0. OL 11908594M.
- Cokayne, George Edward (1949). The Complete Peerage. Vol. 11. London: St Catherine's Press. p. 718.
- Chrimes, Stanley Bertram (1972), Henry VII. -, Berkeley, ISBN 0-520-02266-1, 0520022661
- Williams, C. H. (1928). "The Rebellion of Humphrey Stafford in 1486". The English Historical Review. 43 (170). Oxford University Press: 181–9. doi:10.1093/ehr/xliii.clxx.181. ISSN 1477-4534. JSTOR 552001.
- Dyer, Christopher (2000). Bromsgrove: a small town in Worcestershire in the Middle Ages. Occasional Publications. Vol. 9. Worcestershire Historical Society. ISSN 0140-9913.
