= Bromsgrove railway station =

Railway station in Worcestershire, England

Coordinates: 52.323°N 2.048°W

Bromsgrove
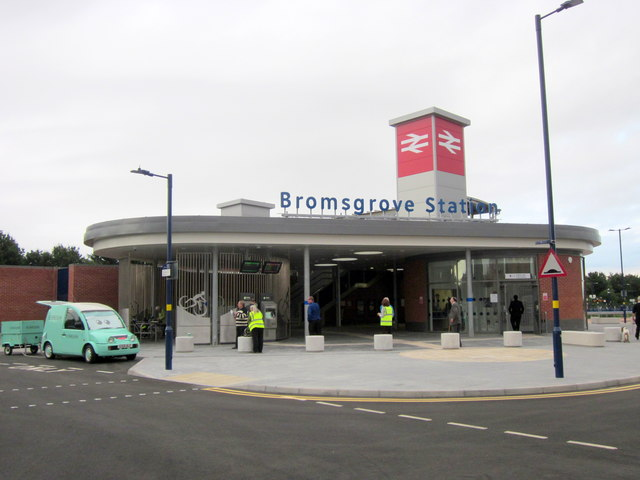

General information
- Location: Bromsgrove, Bromsgrove District, England
- Grid reference: SO968693
- Manager: West Midlands Railway
- Platforms: 4

Other information
- Station code: BMV
- Classification: DfT category F1

Key dates
- 24 June 1840: Opened
- 12 July 2016: Relocated

Passengers
- 2021/22: ▲0.415 million
- 2022/23: ▲0.513 million
- 2023/24: ▲0.592 million
- 2024/25: ▲0.696 million
- 2025/26: ▲0.763 million
Location
Notes
- Passenger statistics from the Office of Rail and Road

Bromsgrove railway station serves the town of Bromsgrove in Worcestershire, England. It is located at the foot of the two-mile Lickey Incline which ascends at a gradient of 1-in-37.7 towards Barnt Green on the line between Birmingham and Worcester. Bromsgrove is managed by West Midlands Railway. The current station opened on 12 July 2016, replacing an older station located slightly to the north.

== History ==
The station opened as part of the Birmingham and Gloucester Railway (later part of the Midland Railway) on 24 June 1840.

On 10 November of that year, an experimental steam locomotive named 'Surprise' burst its boiler at the station, killing the driver, Thomas Scaife, and fireman, Joseph Rutherford (some authorities say the incident happened on the Lickey Incline but this is due to an erroneous early report in the Worcestershire Chronicle which was later corrected.). They are buried in Bromsgrove churchyard.

In June 1969 the station was rebuilt with a single platform on the up (northbound) side, which required stopping down (southbound) trains to cross to the up line and back again after calling at Bromsgrove station. In the 1970s and early 1980s, the service frequency had decreased to a small number of trains in the peak hours. A new platform on the down side was opened in May 1990.

On 4 May 2007, Network Rail announced that a new station will be built, to replace the existing structure. This was to be in a brownfield site adjacent to the current site, and would allow six car trains to stop at the station. The cost was projected to be in the region of £10-12 million, and it was estimated that the station could be operational by Easter 2009. However, by June 2009 the project was still only in the development stage and the funding for it was subsequently frozen by the local authority in June 2010. The local passenger executive set aside £429,000 for the development in autumn 2012.

Contamination of the land was a known factor by February 2013 and was included in the Consultation Report published on the Worcestershire County Council website. Planning permission for the new station was eventually granted by Worcestershire County Council in September 2013, three years after the funding for it was previously withdrawn. By this stage it had been decided that the station would have four platforms, able to accommodate nine car trains, and linked by a covered footbridge served by lifts and stairs. A ticket office, waiting room and toilets would also be provided. Work began on the new station in March 2014.

Even after construction started, the opening date for the station was delayed several times. It was first scheduled to open in May 2015 and then was postponed to November 2015. It was later due for spring 2016. However contamination on site and a previously undiscovered culvert resulted in the opening date being pushed back to Summer 2016. The new £24 million station opened on 12 July 2016, initially with two platforms in use for passengers but platform three will be a turnback platform for services that terminate at Bromsgrove. The old station platforms and associated structures were removed and demolished during track remodelling in November 2016.

The station name signs on the platforms are on a gold background with white text instead of the usual white background with black text. This was unveiled by London Midland in honour of Lauren Rowles, a local woman who won gold at the 2016 Rio Paralympics.

Phase two of the station redevelopment project saw the electrification of the line from Bromsgrove to Barnt Green, this resulted in an extra three trains per hour on the Cross-City Line serving the new station, when the new electrification went live in 2018. This was originally planned to happen between 2011 and 2014, but this date has been amended in the wake of the delays to construction work on the new station.

The electrification work involved reconstruction of four overbridges between Barnt Green and Bromsgrove and 9 kilometres (5.6 mi) of electrification works between Barnt Green junction and Bromsgrove. Re-signalling and track relaying work tied into the project at the station and at various points further north saw all services diverted via Kidderminster or replaced by buses between Droitwich Spa and Longbridge for twelve days in the autumn of 2016.

The first timetabled electric services were scheduled to start in May 2018 however in March 2018, plans for an extra 4 trains per hour were delayed to 29 July 2018.

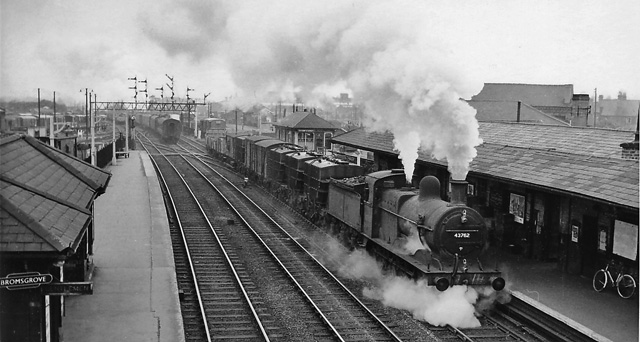
Bromsgrove station in 1960

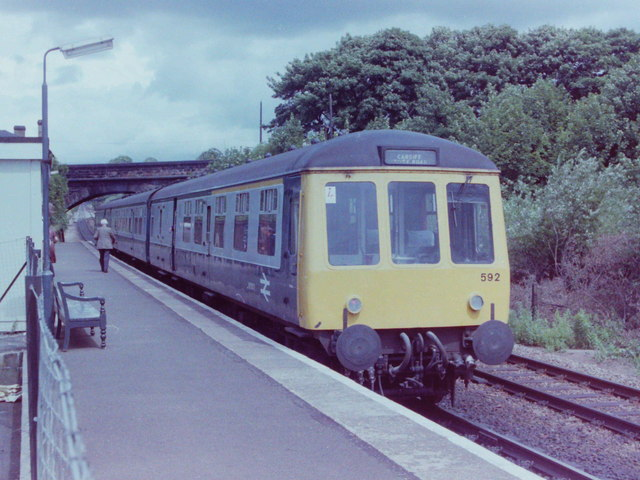
Bromsgrove station in 1981 with one platform

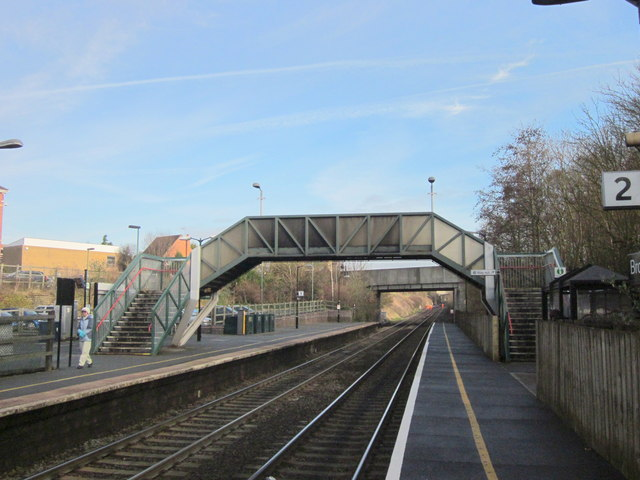
Bromsgrove station in 2012 with two platforms

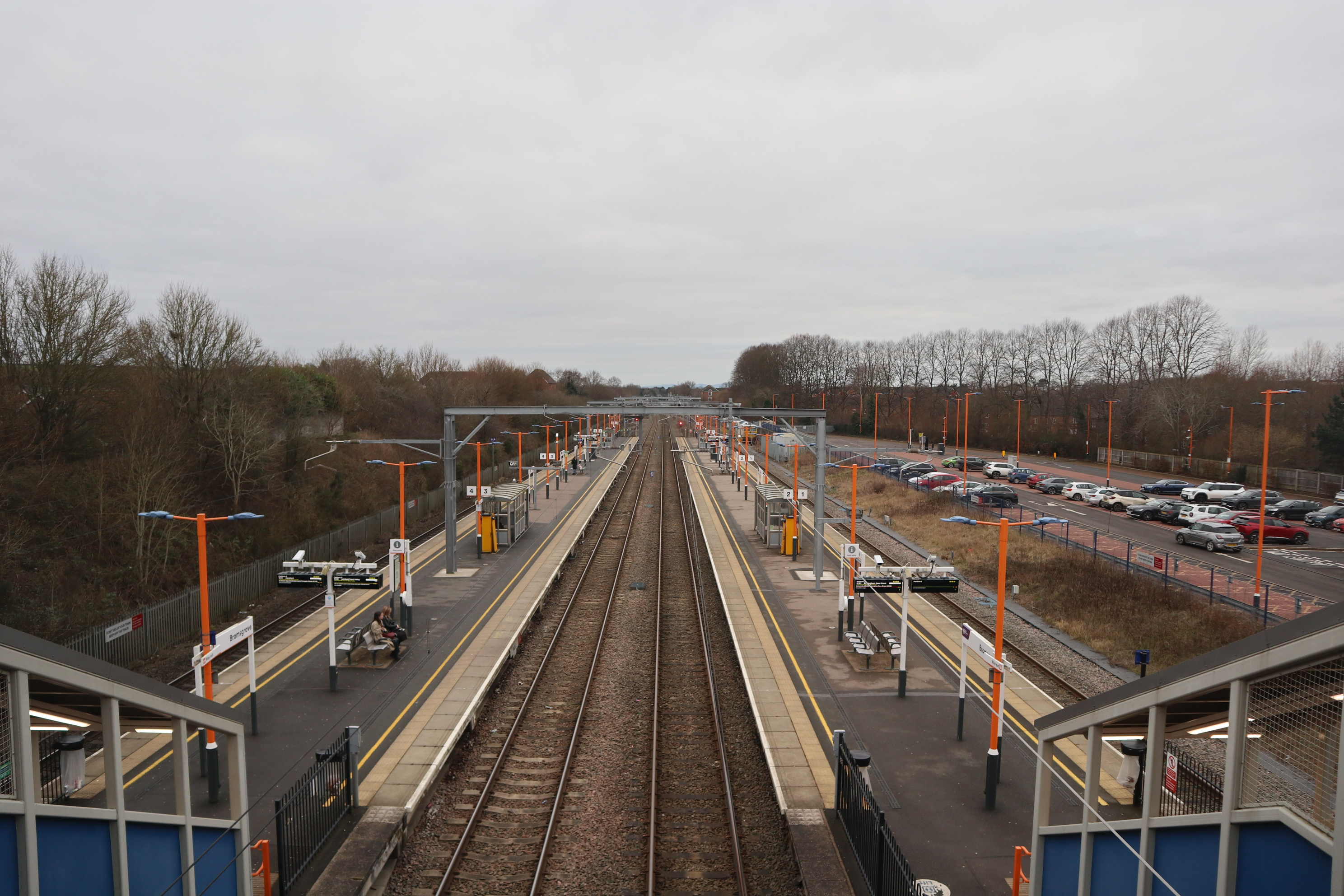
Bromgrove Station in 2025 with 4 platforms and electrification

== Accidents and incidents ==
- On 10 November 1840, the steam locomotive Surprise suffered a boiler explosion at the station, killing two people and severely injuring two more.
- On 7 April 1841, the plug of a steam locomotive's boiler blew out on the Lickey Incline, killing one person and injuring three others.
- On 31 October 1844, six people were injured when a locomotive ran into the rear of a passenger train at the station.
- On 14 October 1852, six people were injured in a collision and derailment. An express train ran into the rear of a freight train due to an error by a railway policeman.
- On 5 October 1912, Oliver Hawkins was carrying parcels across the train lines, when he was hit by an engine. Hawkins was killed in the collision.
- On 23 March 2020, Class 66 locomotive 66 057 ran through a buffer stop at the end of a siding and was derailed, ending up foul of the running line. A Class 170 diesel multiple unit collided with the locomotive. None of the two crew or four passengers on board were injured. The driver of the locomotive was subsequently convicted of an offence contrary to the Health and Safety at Work etc. Act 1974. He was sentenced to 8 months' imprisonment, suspended for 18 months.

== Services ==
The station and all trains serving it are operated by West Midlands Trains, who operate an hourly service from Birmingham New Street to Hereford; with additional services in the peak hours starting or terminating short at Great Malvern and Worcester Shrub Hill. Electric services on the Cross City Line began running to/from Birmingham New Street and Lichfield Trent Valley from 29 July 2018. Two trains per hour operate each way on weekdays to and from Lichfield Trent Valley. On Sundays, the frequency is hourly to and from New Street only. The limited Mon-Sat CrossCountry service from here was withdrawn from 30 July 2018. CrossCountry said their decision to withdraw the services was made as electrification of the line meant the town no longer needed the limited stops.

Preceding station	National Rail	Following station
University	West Midlands Railway Birmingham to Worcester via Bromsgrove line + Cotswold Line	Droitwich Spa
Barnt Green	West Midlands Railway Birmingham to Worcester via Bromsgrove line + Cotswold Line	Droitwich Spa
Longbridge or Barnt Green	West Midlands Railway; Cross-City Line	Terminus
	Disused railways	
Blackwell; Station Closed and Line Open	Great Western Railway; Stoke Branch Line	Stoke Works; Station Closed and Line Open
Blackwell	Birmingham and Gloucester Railway	Stoke Works
