= St John the Baptist Church, Bromsgrove =

St John's Church, Bromsgrove
- St John the Baptist Church, Bromsgrove
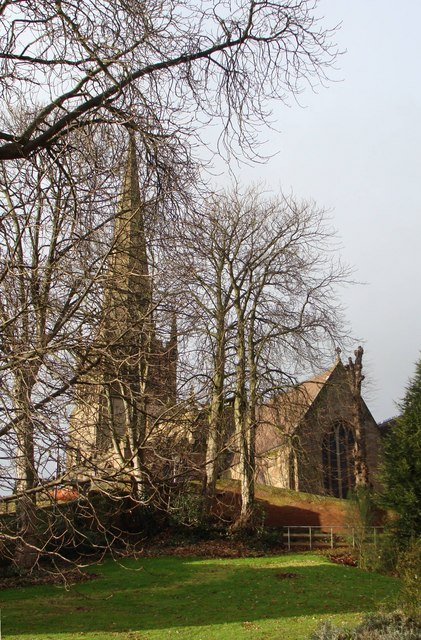
- Church of St John the Baptist, Bromsgrove
- St John's Church, Bromsgrove
- 52°20′02.8″N 2°3′52.6″W
- OS grid reference: SO 95697 70677
- Location: Bromsgrove
- Country: England
- Denomination: Church of England
- Previous denomination: Roman Catholic
- Website: St Johns Bromsgrove

History
- Dedication: St John the Baptist

Administration
- Diocese: Diocese of Worcester
- Archdeaconry: Dudley
- Deanery: Bromsgrove
- Parish: Bromsgrove

The Church of St John the Baptist, Bromsgrove is a Grade I listed parish church in the Church of England in Bromsgrove.

== History ==
The church belonged to a particularly large Parish during the early Norman period. Henry III arranged for the church and lands to be granted to Worcester Priory in order to support the remembrance of his father King John I, who is buried there. The Priory then ran the manor and collected rents and other income until the dissolution, at which point the lands transferred to the new Dean and Chapter.

In February 1643, Charles I ordered that Bromsgrove's vicar John Hall be removed from his post as a rebel. Disputes about the vicarage continued through the Interregnum and Protectorate. John Hall was vicar again until 1652. His successor John Spilsbury, previously a fellow of Magdalen College, was unpopular with some of Bromsgrove's churchgoers, who attempted unsuccessfully to eject him. Spilsbury was removed after the Restoration of the Monarchy in 1660, and left the Church of England by refusing to conform to the Act of Uniformity along with around 2,000 other Anglican ministers from the Commonwealth period. He was confined to his house, banished from the county and finally imprisoned for his non-conformism. The toll on his health may have led to ill health and his death. He did return to Bromsgrove, where he was annually visited by Hall's son John, an Anglican bishop. Spilsbury was licensed as a Congregationalist teacher in 1672 in Bromsgrove and died in 1699. (Note: Spilsbury married the elder John Hall's daughter. Hall's son John became a bishop, the last with Presbyterian views. Spilsbury's son John led a dissenting congregation in Kidderminster, and in turn his son Francis Spilsbury became a minister at Salters' Hall in London.) A memorial to Bishop John Hall can be found in the Church; a memorial to his father was present in the eighteenth century, according to Treadway Nash.

== Building ==
The church dates from the 12th century, but is predominantly of 14th and 15th century construction. It was restored in 1858 by George Gilbert Scott.

There are 13th century and early 16th century alabaster monuments in the north chapel and an alabaster effigy of 1517 in the chancel.

In 1855, the church built Holy Trinity Church, Lickey as a chapel of ease.

Church bells are recorded from the 1690s. The first mention of a clock is from 1684.

=== War memorial ===
Inside the church is a large, cast metal memorial to the men of Bromsgrove who were killed in the First World War. Among the names listed is Captain Noel Chavasse, VC & Bar, MC (1884–1917), the medical doctor and Olympic athlete from the Chavasse family. He is one of only three people to be awarded a Victoria Cross twice.

=== Burials ===
- Sir Humphrey Stafford and his wife Eleanor
- Gilbert Talbot (soldier) and his first wife, Lady Elizabeth Talbot (née Greystoke, died 1490)
- John Talbot (died 1549) and his wives Margaret (née Troutbeck) and Elizabeth (née Wrottesley) - buried side by side
- Ralph Greystoke, 5th Baron Greystoke

=== Organ ===
There are records of organ in the church dating from 1808 when a small instrument was installed by Thomas Elliot. The opening recital was given by Bishop Simms. There have been subsequent rebuildings and renovations over the years, resulting in a 3-manual and pedal pipe organ, largely by the Malvern firm of Nicholson. A specification of the organ can be found on the National Pipe Organ Register.

=== Organists ===
- James Simms 1809 - 1854
- J. B. Tirbutt 1854 - ????

== Churchyard ==
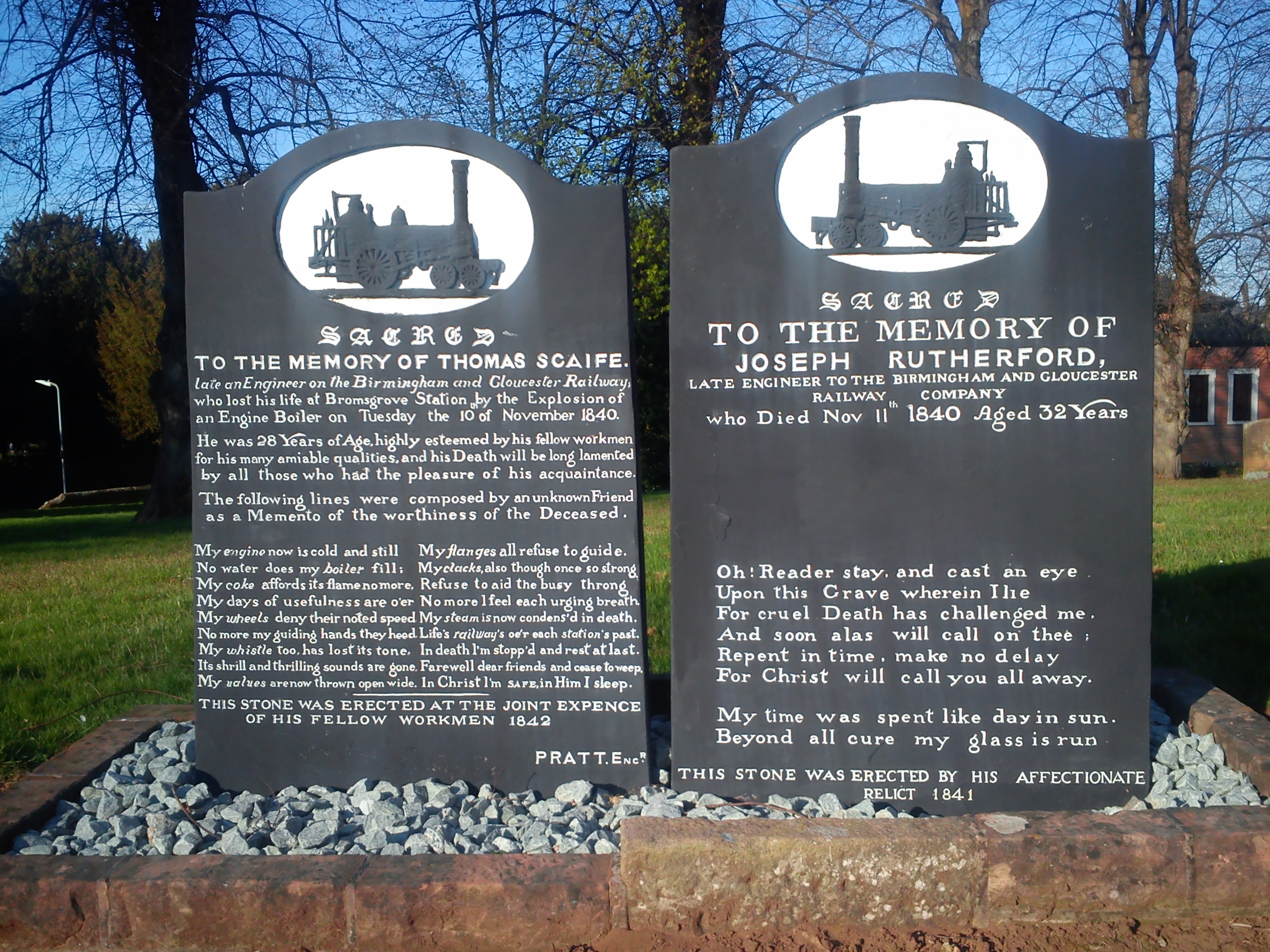
The graves of engine driver Scaife and fireman Rutherford in the churchyard

Buried side by side in the churchyard are two railwaymen, engine driver Thomas Scaife and fireman Joseph Rutherford, who both lost their lives when the boiler of a locomotive exploded in Bromsgrove station on 10 November 1840. Their gravestones both show reliefs of steam locomotives. However, the locomotive involved was an experimental one and not one of those depicted on the stones.

== Sources ==
- Willis Bund, John William; Doubleday, Herbert Arthur; Page, William, eds. (1913). "Parishes: Bromsgrove". A History of the County of Worcester. Vol. 3. London: Victoria County History. pp. 19–33.
- Pevsner, Nikolaus; Brookes, Alan (January 2007), "Bromsgrove", Worcestershire, The Buildings of England (Revised ed.), London: Yale University Press (published 2007), pp. 190–207, ISBN 9780300112986, OL 10319229M
- Dyer, Christopher (2000). Bromsgrove: a small town in Worcestershire in the Middle Ages. Occasional Publications. Vol. 9. Worcestershire Historical Society. ISSN 0140-9913.
- Cotton, William Alfred (1881), Bromsgrove Church, London: Simpkin, Marshall, and Co., OCLC 6677955, OL 13997362M
- Atkin, Malcolm (2004). Worcestershire under arms. Barnsley: Pen and Sword. ISBN 1-84415-072-0. OL 11908594M.
- Jones, John Andrews (1849), "Francis Spilsbury", Bunhill memorials, London: James Paul, pp. 259–260, OL 19672792M
- Calamy, Edmund (1713), "Bromsgrove, Mr John Spilsbury MA", An account of the ministers, lecturers, masters, and fellows of colleges and schoolmasters: who were ejected or silenced after the Restoration in 1660, by or before, the Act of Uniformity., vol. 1, London: Printed for J. Lawrence, pp. 772–73
- Gordon, Alexander (1917), "Spilsbury, John M.A.", Freedom after ejection: a review (1690-1692) of Presbyterian and Congregational nonconformity in England and Wales, Manchester: University Press, p. 356 — read page 356 at archive.org
