= Lickey Incline =

Steep rail incline in England

Coordinates: 52.33708°N 2.02344°W

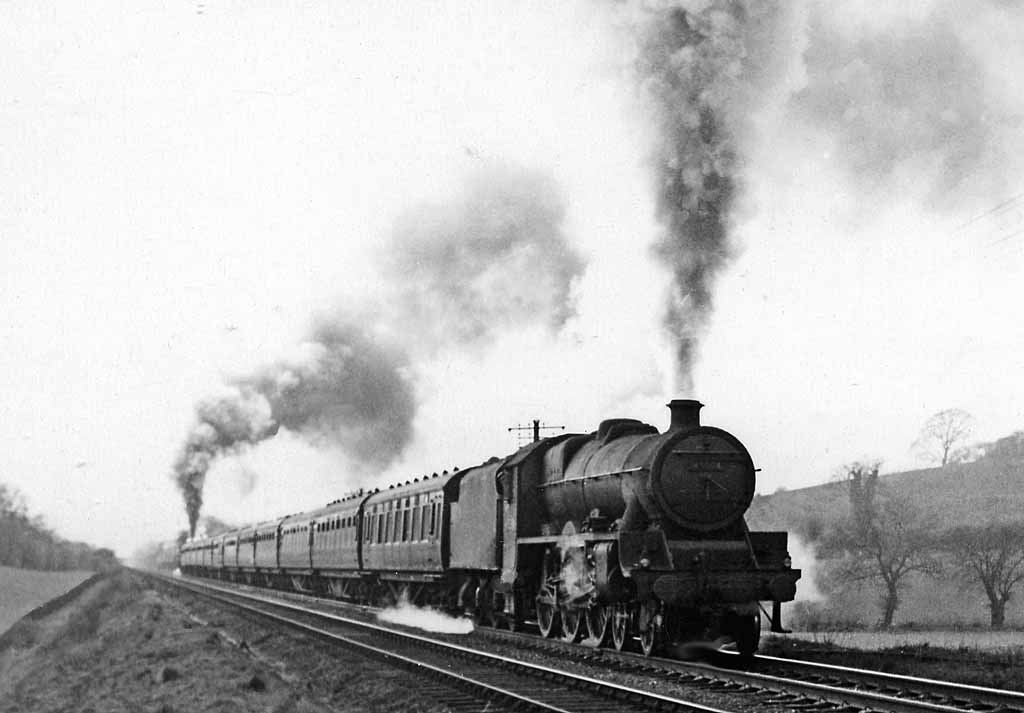
- An LMS Jubilee Class working hard to ascend the Lickey at about 10 mph (16 km/h) with the steam from the assisting banking engine seen at the back

Overview
- Other name: Lickey Bank

Technical
- Number of tracks: 2
- Track gauge: 1,435 mm (4 ft 8 1/2 in) standard gauge

The Lickey Incline, south of Birmingham, is the steepest sustained main-line railway incline in Great Britain. The climb is a gradient of 1 in 37.7 (2.65% or 26.5‰ or 1.52°) for a continuous distance of two miles (3.2 km). Constructed originally for the Birmingham and Gloucester Railway (B&GR) and opened in 1840, it is located on the modern Cross Country Route between Barnt Green and Bromsgrove stations in Worcestershire.

In earlier times many trains required the assistance of banking locomotives with associated logistical considerations to ensure that the train reached the top; now only the heaviest of freight trains require such assistance.

== History and geography ==
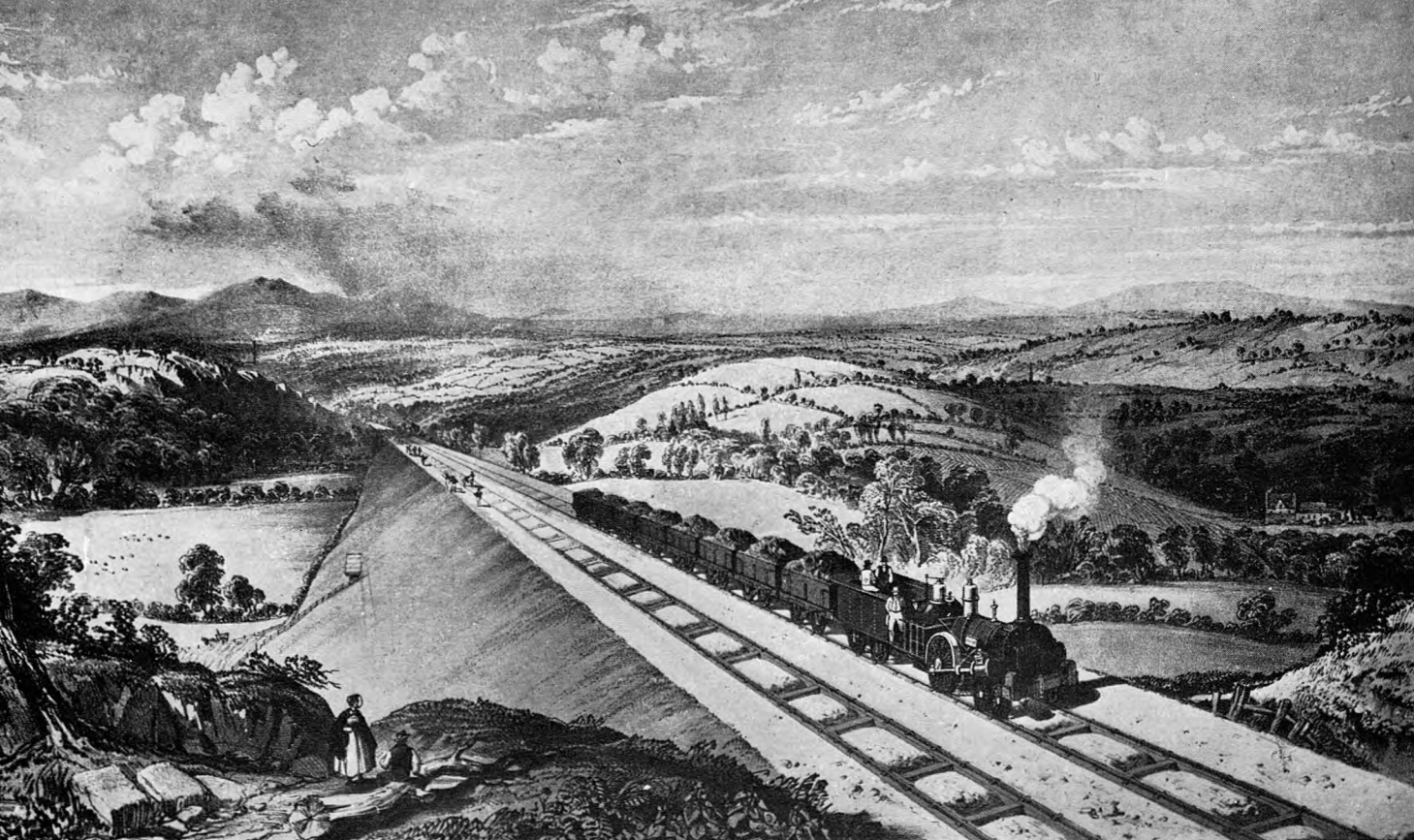
The Lickey Incline. c. 1845

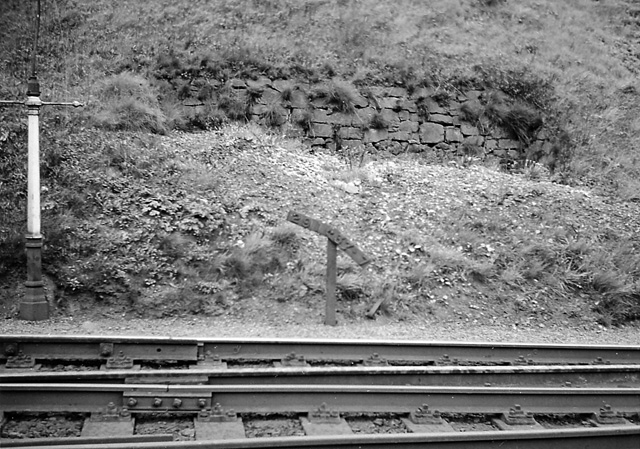
1 in 37 Gradient post marking the summit of Lickey Bank, 1957

An 1832 survey by Isambard Kingdom Brunel for a line between Birmingham and Gloucester followed a longer route well to the east, avoiding population centres and with a maximum 1 in 300 gradient, but the plan lapsed because the cost was deemed too high. In 1836, William Moorsom was engaged to survey a suitable route on a no success - no fee basis. (Note: Other sources may claim the basis was remuneration linked to the savings achieved) He chose the shortest and least costly path by avoiding the high-land-cost population centres of Worcester, Droitwich, and Tewkesbury. However, the disadvantage was the need to mount the steep Lickey Incline.

An independent engineer, Joseph Locke, was asked to review Moorsom's work. Locke felt that the Lickey Incline would be no more dangerous than a turnpike road on an incline, and he saw no reason for an alternative route. Brunel and George Stephenson declared it would be impractical for locomotives to work such a steep gradient, (Note: Stationary engines were used on various railways with steep inclines at that time) but Moorsom was aware of claims about the climbing prowess of American Norris locomotives and ordered such engines against their advice.

The Lickey Incline was opened for traffic on 17 September 1840, following the arrival of the second Norris Class A locomotive, "Boston". That avoided the first, "Philadelphia", being a single point of failure in the operation of the incline..

The climb, between Bromsgrove and Blackwell (near Barnt Green), is just over 2 miles (3.2 km), at an average gradient of 1 in 37.7 (2.65%). It is on the line between Birmingham and Gloucester (grid reference SO985710), and is the steepest sustained adhesion-worked gradient on a British standard gauge railway. It climbs into Birmingham from the south over the Bunter geological formation (one or two exposures are visible from the track-side), and passes about 1 1/2 miles (2.4 km) away from the Lickey Hills, a well-known local beauty spot.

Working of the Lickey fell to successor companies of the B&GR: the Bristol and Birmingham, the Midland (MR) from 1845, the London, Midland and Scottish (LMS) from 1923, and the London Midland Region of British Railways (BR) from 1948. The Lickey was transferred to the BR Western Region on 1 February 1958. Privatisation in 1993 saw the infrastructure fall under the remit of Railtrack until 2010 and Network Rail thereafter. Freight Operating Companies (FOC) organise banking for the relatively small number of heavy freights that now require it.

The incline was electrified overhead as part of the scheme to extend electric Cross-City Line trains to a re-sited Bromsgrove railway station. The first electric train, composed of two Class 323 electric multiple units, ran on 20 May 2018. Scheduled electric services started in July 2018.

Broadly, the same hillside is climbed by the Tardebigge lock flight on the Worcester and Birmingham Canal.

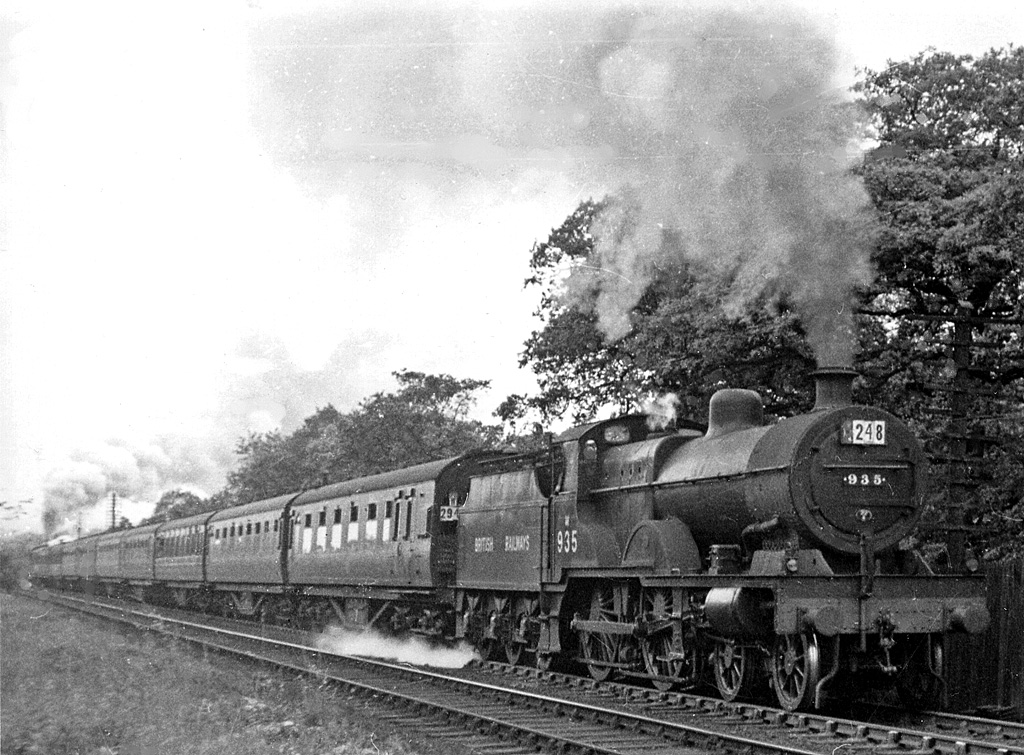
Up express, 1948

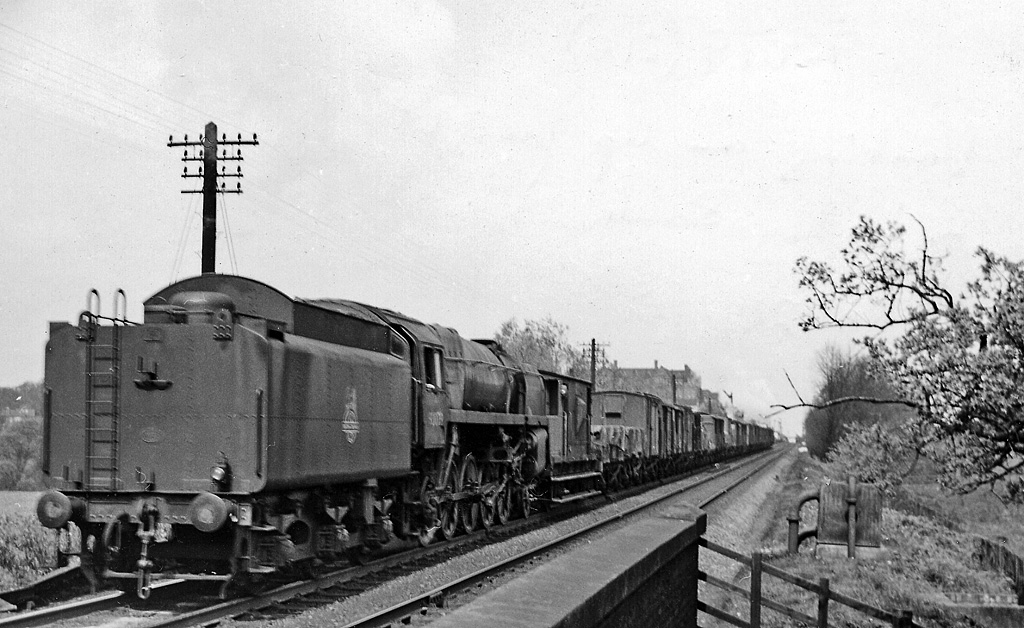
BR 9F banker near the summit at Blackwell, 1957

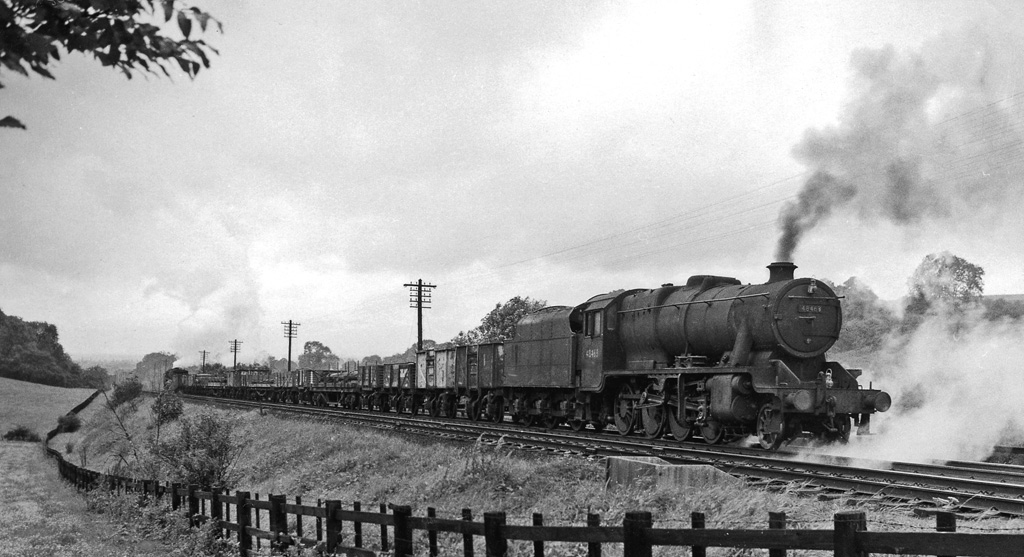
Freight train ascending the Lickey Bank, 1963

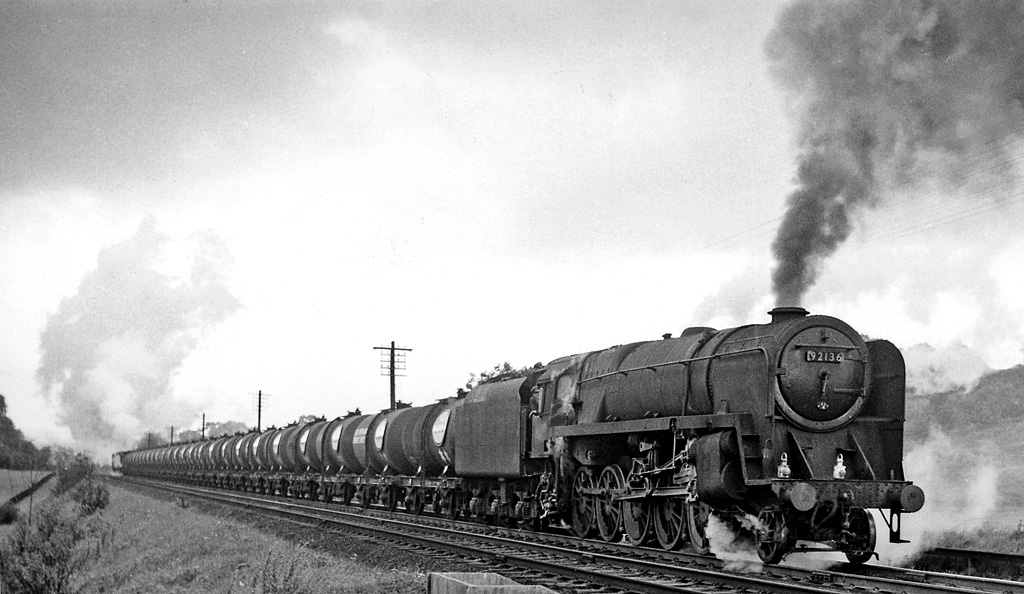
BR 9F hauling a heavy oil train up the bank, 1963

== Bankers ==
=== Steam locomotives ===
To assist trains up the incline and in some cases to provide additional braking, particularly to unfitted freights, specialised banking engines were kept at Bromsgrove shed at the foot of the incline.

The first Lickey bankers were the American Norris 4-2-0s Class A Extra locomotives Philadelphia, Boston and William Gwynn delivered in May, June and December 1841 respectively. They met the requirement to lift 75 tons up the incline at 15 miles per hour (24 km/h). The arrival of Boston allowed operations over Lickey to commence to Croft Farm on 17 September 1841. James McConnell converted the bank engines to saddle tanks in 1842 and increased the haulage capacity up the incline to between 80 and 90 tons gross, sufficient for any train of the day. Two further Class A extra Norris engines, Niagara and New York were obtained for a bargain price of £1,100 each in May 1842 and it is suggested these may have been used as auxiliary bankers during heavy traffic; there are also suggestions they were saddle tanked at some point. They were disposed of between 1851 and 1856.

The Birmingham and Gloucester railway had 26 Norris-type engines in total of which nine were built in England, three by Benjamin Hick and Sons and six by Nasmyth, Gaskell and Company, however only the five Class A Extra type could climb the Lickey incline with a significant load. English manufacturers had declined to supply.

In June 1845, a large 0-6-0ST designed by James McConnell was built at Bromsgrove Works and named Great Britain. Designed specifically for the Lickey, it was the most powerful locomotive of its day and could haul a train of 135 tons at between 8 miles per hour (13 km/h) and 10 miles per hour (16 km/h) up the incline.

In 1855–6, Matthew Kirtley rebuilt the 1844 Jones and Potts 0-6-0 long-boiler freight engines Bristol and Hercules with 5 feet 0 inches (1.52 m) wheels and 16 by 24 inches (410 mm × 610 mm) cylinders for use as Lickey bankers. As MR Nos. 222 and 223, they were used as bankers until withdrawal in 1860 and 1862 respectively.

The 1860s saw the Midland Railway at Derby build or rebuild four locomotives for the Lickey replacing the existing bankers. December 1860 saw the introduction of two 0-6-0WT locomotives, Nos. 222 and 320 (later 220), which lasted until the 1890s. An 0-6-0WT No. 223 was constructed in 1862 and Great Britain was rebuilt to match that locomotive in 1863 and withdrawn in 1928 (as LMS 1607) and 1901 respectively. (Note: The numbers 222 and 223 were carried by both Jones and Potts engines and their replacements, and were carried by five other locomotives each also; there was also additional renumbering of these engines, see (Baxter 1982) for details.) 1377 Class 1Fs, and later 2441 Class 0-6-0Ts were used on the route.

In 1919, the specialised 0-10-0 No. 2290, known as the "Lickey Banker" and nicknamed "Big Bertha", was introduced to complement the existing 0-6-0Ts. This locomotive was withdrawn in 1956 and replaced by BR Standard Class 9F No. 92079, which acquired the 0-10-0's headlight. Other 9Fs (including 92129, 92135, 92205, 92223, 92230, 92231 and 92234) would deputise for 92079 whenever it needed repairs.

The LNER Class U1 Garratt was also tried out unsuccessfully in 1949–1950 and again in 1955. On one occasion it was banking a train hauled by LMS Garratt No. 47972 which stalled on the bank and was rescued by "Big Bertha", resulting in the formation of a train with nineteen driving axles.

The Lickey was transferred to the Western Region in 1958 and the 3F tanks were replaced by GWR 9400 Class pannier tanks. GWR 5205 Class 2-8-0T-No. 5226 was used from May 1958 for two years while a trial with GWR 7200 Class 2-8-2T No. 7235 on 18 April 1958 was abandoned after its cylinders failed to clear platform edges.

On 7 October 1965 Great Western Hall number 6947 Helmingham Hall was sent to Bromsgrove to replace a derailed English Electric Type 3 (D6939), becoming the last steam locomotive to bank on the Lickey Incline under BR.

==== Steam era operations ====
In early times, banking was performed by a pilot engine attaching to the front of the train, with rear banking only in case of emergency. This was due to the use of dumb rather than sprung buffers, and the Norris Class A Extras had adaptations to increase adhesive weight under load. At the top of the hill the pilot was uncoupled from the train engine, which would slack off power and allow the pilot to go forward roughly thirty yards (27 m) into a siding with the policeman resetting the points for the train to continue onward. From May 1842 after the Norris engines were given saddle tanks, they operated all trains up and down the Lickey themselves with train engines being detached and remaining either at the North or South end of the incline. Rear banking was adopted later.

The bankers would stand in a siding on the up side to the south. The load of each train would be telegraphed from Cheltenham.

If the driver decided he needed more bankers than provided, he would whistle approaching Stoke Works signal box: a short whistle, pause, and a number of shorts indicating the number of bankers he wanted (The 0-10-0 banker "Big Bertha" and the 9F 2-10-0's all counted as two). The train would stop at a marker fifteen yards (14 m) to the rear of Bromsgrove Station up home signal, or further up if necessary to clear the crossover for the bankers to reach the back of the train. They were not coupled to the train or to each other. When in position each banker gave two crow whistles, and the train driver gave two crows in reply. Then he would give one long whistle and all would proceed forward.

At the top the bankers kept pushing through Blackwell station and then shut off in turn, keeping far apart, then crossed over to the down line and closed up ready to return.

To increase speed during high traffic, the Blackwell down advance starter signal had a 'calling-on' arm, which allowed the bankers to return downhill 'on visual' while the section to Bromsgrove was still occupied by a descending train. Descending trains were never accepted unless the line was clear as far as Bromsgrove South, and were strictly required to slow to 10 mph (16.1 km/h) at the top and not exceed 27 mph (43.5 km/h) on the way down. Loose-coupled freight trains had to stop at the top to apply wagon brakes and not exceed 11 mph (17.7 km/h).

=== Diesel locomotives ===
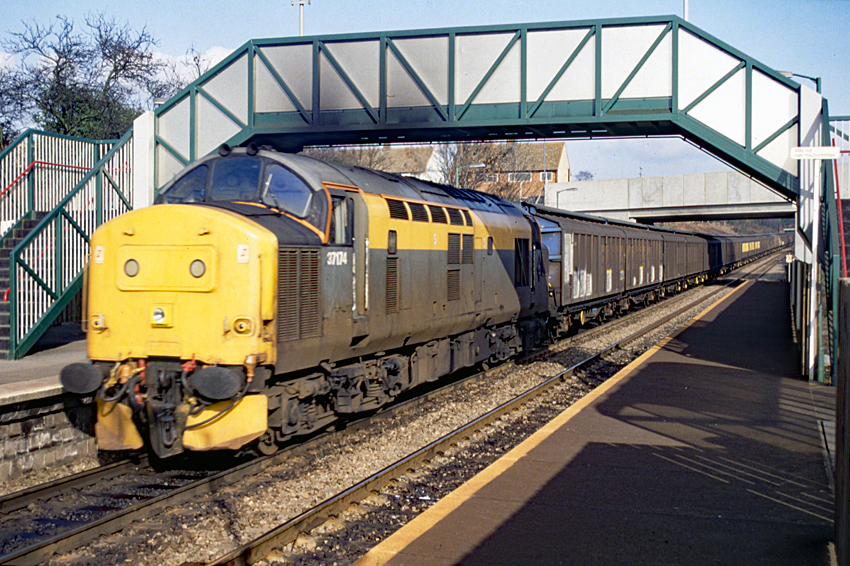
37174 at Bromsgrove; Lickey banker in 1991

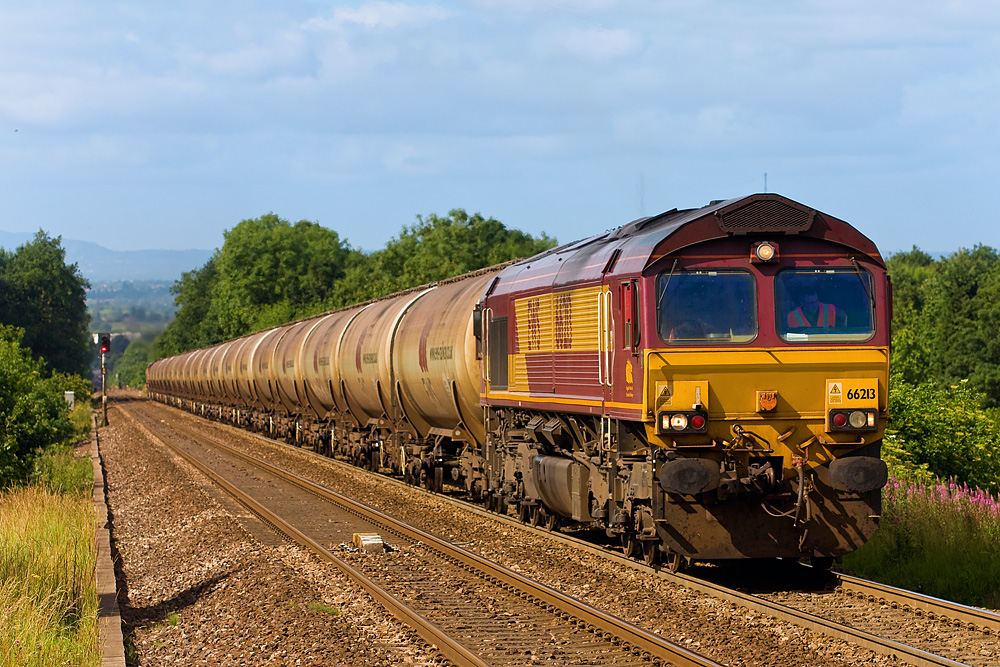
A DB Schenker Class 66 66213 tackling the Lickey with banker further down at the rear in 2010

Steam was replaced by Class 37s, working in pairs. Other classes that appeared include Class 35 Hymeks. The Hymeks allocated to Lickey banking duties were modified so that the lowest transmission ratio was inoperative, despite the requirement for high tractive effort. The reason for this modification was that the typical speed of a train ascending the bank was approximately that at which the transmission would change between first and second gear, and so it tended to "hunt" between the two. The repeated gear changes under full power caused excessive wear and damage, and the simplest way to avoid the problem was to lock first gear out of action, so the locomotives used only second gear and upwards.

First-generation diesel multiple unit (DMUs) were somewhat underpowered and climbed the bank often at walking pace, especially as they aged; it was not unusual for them to need to be rescued by a banker. The more powerful modern DMUs climb the line with little speed reduction, though there remain rules that at least half the engines of a Class 220 or 221 must be working in order to ascend. Regular banking of passenger trains ceased in the summer of 1988 when the Bristol to Scotland sleeper was modified to have two portions from Poole and Plymouth joining at Birmingham. Many current freight trains still need to be banked however and since 2003 DB Cargo UK use dedicated Class 66 locomotives, nos. 66055–057 and 66059 (and formerly 66058). These are modified with air-released swing-away buckeye couplers and a downward facing light to assist nighttime buffering up.
