= Clarke baronets of Dunham Lodge (1831) =

Escutcheon of the Clarke baronets of Dunham Lodge

The Clarke Baronetcy, of Dunham Lodge in the County of Norfolk, was created in the Baronetage of the United Kingdom on 30 September 1831 for Charles Clarke, Physician to Queen Adelaide. The third Baronet was a prominent soldier. The sixth Baronet adopted the additional Christian name of Tobias in 1962. The current baronet, Sir Lawrence Clarke, was selected for Great Britain in the XXX Olympiad in London in 2012 for the 110m hurdles.

== Clarke baronets, of Dunham Lodge (1831) ==
- Sir Charles Mansfield Clarke, 1st Baronet (1782–1857)
- Reverend Sir Charles Clarke, 2nd Baronet (1812–1899)
- General Sir Charles Mansfield Clarke, 3rd Baronet GCB GCVO (1839–1932)
- Sir Orme Bigland Clarke, 4th Baronet CBE (1880–1949)
- Sir Humphrey Orme Clarke, 5th Baronet (1906–1973)
- Sir (Charles Mansfield) Tobias "Toby" Clarke, 6th Baronet (1939–2019)
- Sir Charles Lawrence Somerset Clarke, 7th Baronet (born 1990).

== Notes ==
Baronetage of the United Kingdom
Preceded by Chaytor baronets	Clarke baronets of Dunham Lodge; 30 September 1831	Succeeded by Douglas baronets
