= Sir Humphrey Clarke, 5th Baronet =

Sir Humphrey Clarke Bt
- Born: Humphrey Orme Clarke; 6 July 1906; London, United Kingdom
- Died: 22 January 1973 (aged 66); Bibury, Gloucestershire, UK
- Education: Christ Church, Oxford
- Spouses: Frances Mary Powys Sketchley (m. 1931; div. 1936) Elisabeth Cook Campbell (m. 1938, divorced) Constance Gibbs Langton (m. 1947; div. 1953)
- Children: Sir Toby Clarke, 6th Baronet; Orme Roosevelt Clarke
- Parent(s): Sir Orme Bigland Clarke, 4th Baronet; Elfrida Roosevelt
- Relatives: Theo Clarke (granddaughter); Lawrence Clarke (grandson)

Sir Humphrey Orme Clarke, 5th Baronet (6 July 1906 – 22 January 1973), was an English diplomat.

== Early life ==
Clarke was born on 6 July 1906, in London, United Kingdom. He was the son of Sir Orme Bigland Clarke, 4th Baronet and Elfrida Roosevelt. Humphrey had two younger brothers, Alfred Roosevelt Orme Clarke (who died young), and Charles Frederick Orme Clarke. His father was a barrister who had inherited the baronetcy from his uncle, General Sir Charles Clarke, 3rd Baronet, in 1932.

His paternal grandparents were Frederick Clarke (second son of the Rev. Sir Charles Clarke, 2nd Baronet) and Adelaide Catherine Kerrison. His maternal grandparents were Alfred Roosevelt (a son of James A. Roosevelt) and Katherine Lowell (a daughter of Augustus Lowell). Through his mother, he was a first cousin, twice removed from U.S. President Theodore Roosevelt and a second cousin, twice removed from President Franklin D. Roosevelt.

He was educated at Eton College, where he was Captain of the Oppidans, and Christ Church, Oxford.

== Career ==
Sir Humphrey was with the British Embassy in Washington between 1941 and 1944. He was with the Foreign Office between 1944 and 1946. He succeeded to the title of 5th Baronet Clarke, of Dunham Lodge, co. Norfolk (UK, 1831) on 31 March 1949.

== Personal life ==
On 12 June 1931, Clarke was married to Frances Mary Powys Sketchley, a daughter of Maj. Frederick Powys Sketchley. They divorced in 1936.

On 1 September 1938, he married Elisabeth Irene (née Cook) Campbell, the daughter of Dr. William Alexander Cook of Tulsa, Oklahoma and former wife of Colin Leiter Campbell. They were the parents of:

- Sir Charles Mansfield Tobias Clarke, 6th Baronet (1939–2019), who married Charlotte Walter, daughter of Roderick Walter, in 1971. They divorced in 1979 and he married Teresa Lorraine Aphrodite de Chair, daughter of Somerset de Chair and Margaret Patricia Field-Hart, in 1984.

He married, thirdly, Constance Elizabeth (née Gibbs) Langton, daughter of Herbert Gray Gibbs, on 11 February 1947. She was previously married to John Stephen Langton. Before their divorce in 1953, they were the parents of:

- Orme Roosevelt Clarke (1947–1992), who married Joanna Valentine Schuster, daughter of Maj. John Schuster and Hon. Lorna Frances Hermon-Hodge (a daughter of Roland Hermon-Hodge, 2nd Baron Wyfold), in 1971. They divorced in 1989 and he married Christine V. O'Flaherty, daughter of J. G. O'Flaherty, in 1991.

Sir Humphrey committed suicide by shotgun on 22 January 1973, at the age of 66, at his estate in Bibury, Gloucestershire. He left an estate valued at £786,274, was succeeded in the baronetcy by his eldest son, Toby.

=== Descendants ===
Through his eldest son Toby, he was a grandfather of three: Theodora Roosevelt Clarke (MP for Stafford), Augusta Elfrida Clarke, and Olympic athlete Lawrence Somerset Clarke.

Baronetage of the United Kingdom
Preceded by Orme Bigland Clarke	Baronet (of Dunham Lodge, Norfolk); 1949 – 1973	Succeeded by Charles Mansfield Tobias Clarke
