= Charles Mansfield Clarke =

Charles Mansfield Clarke may refer to:

- Sir Charles Mansfield Clarke, 1st Baronet (1782–1857), English surgeon
- Sir Charles Clarke, 3rd Baronet (1839–1932), English Quartermaster-General and Governor of Malta
