= Bibury Court =

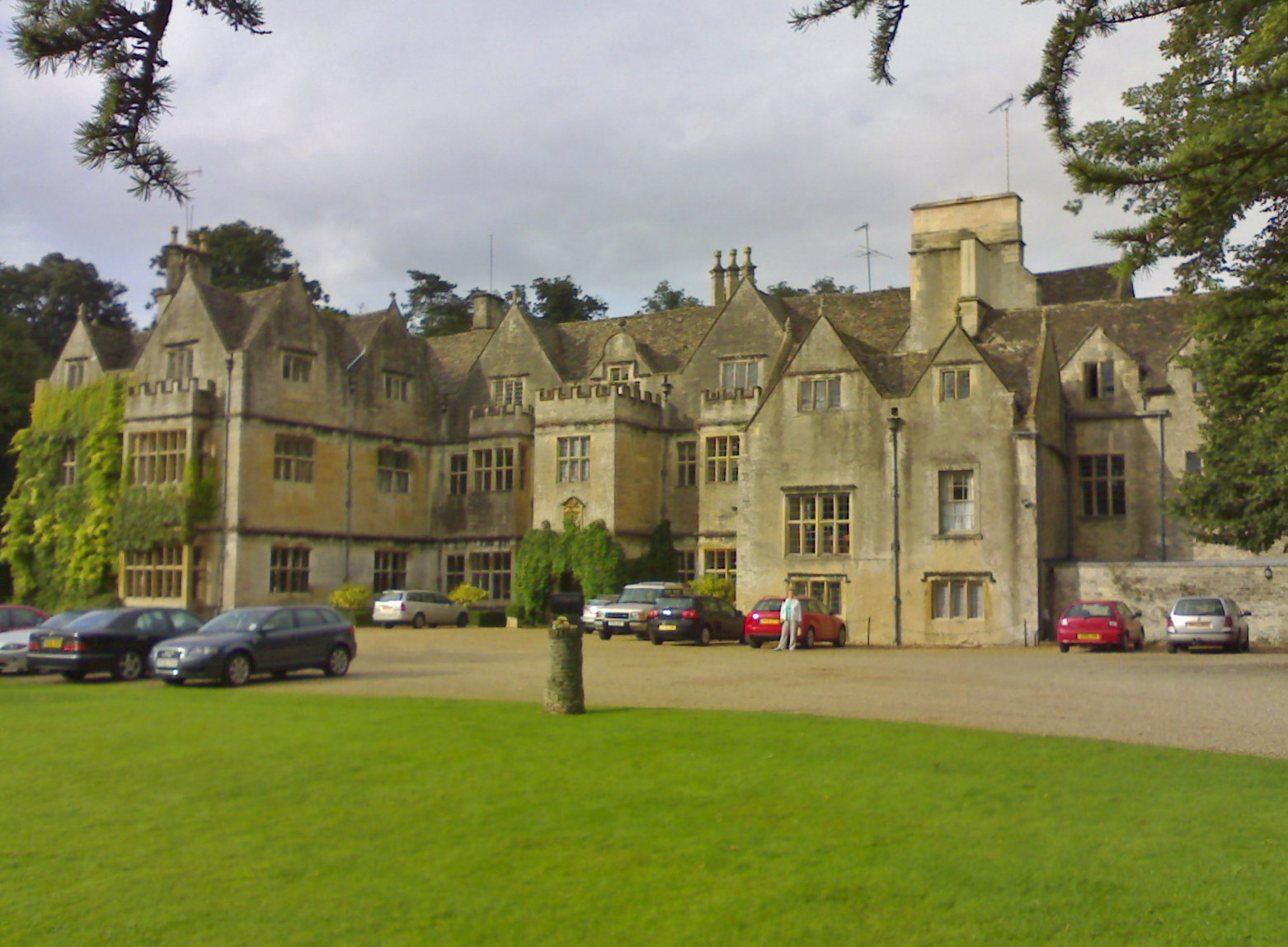
- Bibury Court during its days as a hotel

- Location in Gloucestershire
- 51°45′24″N 1°49′34″W
- Location: Bibury, Gloucestershire, England

Listed Building – Grade I
- Official name: Bibury Court Hotel
- Designated: 23 January 1952
- Reference no.: 1155708

Bibury Court is a Grade I listed Jacobean country house in Bibury, Gloucestershire, England.

The River Coln flows to the south of the property.

== History ==
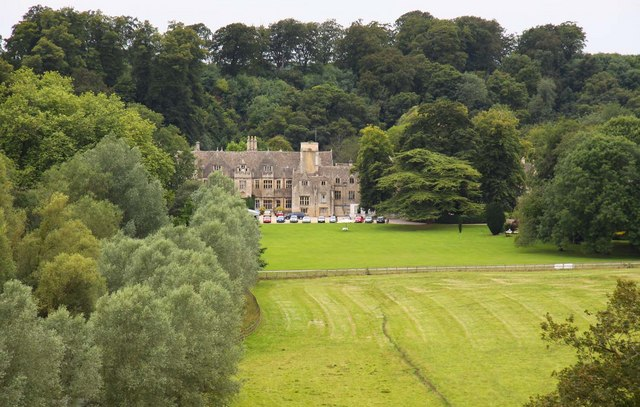
Bibury Court

The house was built between 1560 and 1599, and was first extended in 1633 for Sir Thomas Sackville. Later additions have since been made and the 16th-century building now forms the north wing. The Sackville family including their heirs the Cresswells owned it until 1816 when it was sold to Lord Sherborne. Thomas Estcourt Cresswell had the interior remodelled around 1759.

Sir Orme Clarke Bt CBE bought the house in the 1920s along with most of the surrounding Bibury estate from Lords Sherbourne and lived there with his wife Elfrida (née Roosevelt). The House was sold by Sir Humphrey Clarke Bt in 1963 following the death of his mother but he, and later his son, Sir Tobias Clarke Bt, retained the Court Estate until the 1980s. The northern portion of the estate known as Kilkenny Farm was sold to S. J. Phillips & Sons (Kemble) Ltd who had been tenant farmers to the Clarke family. The house was converted into a hotel in 1968, and back into a private home in 2015, when it was purchased and renovated by the designer Marc Newson and his wife, fashion stylist Charlotte Stockdale.

== Architecture ==
The house and outbuildings are of Cotswold stone. The entrance walls and gateway date from the early 18th century. The 16th-century house now forms the north wing. The east front has a symmetrical centre with the north and south wings to either side. When it was a hotel, the property offered 18 rooms.
