= Henry Fenton =

Henry Fenton may refer to:

- Henry Fenton (MP) (fl. 1416), MP for Stafford
- Henry John Horstman Fenton, chemist
- William Henry Fenton, Canadian politician

== See also ==
- Harry Fenton (disambiguation)
