= Aliona Hlivco =

Ukrainian-British political scientist

- Альона Гливко
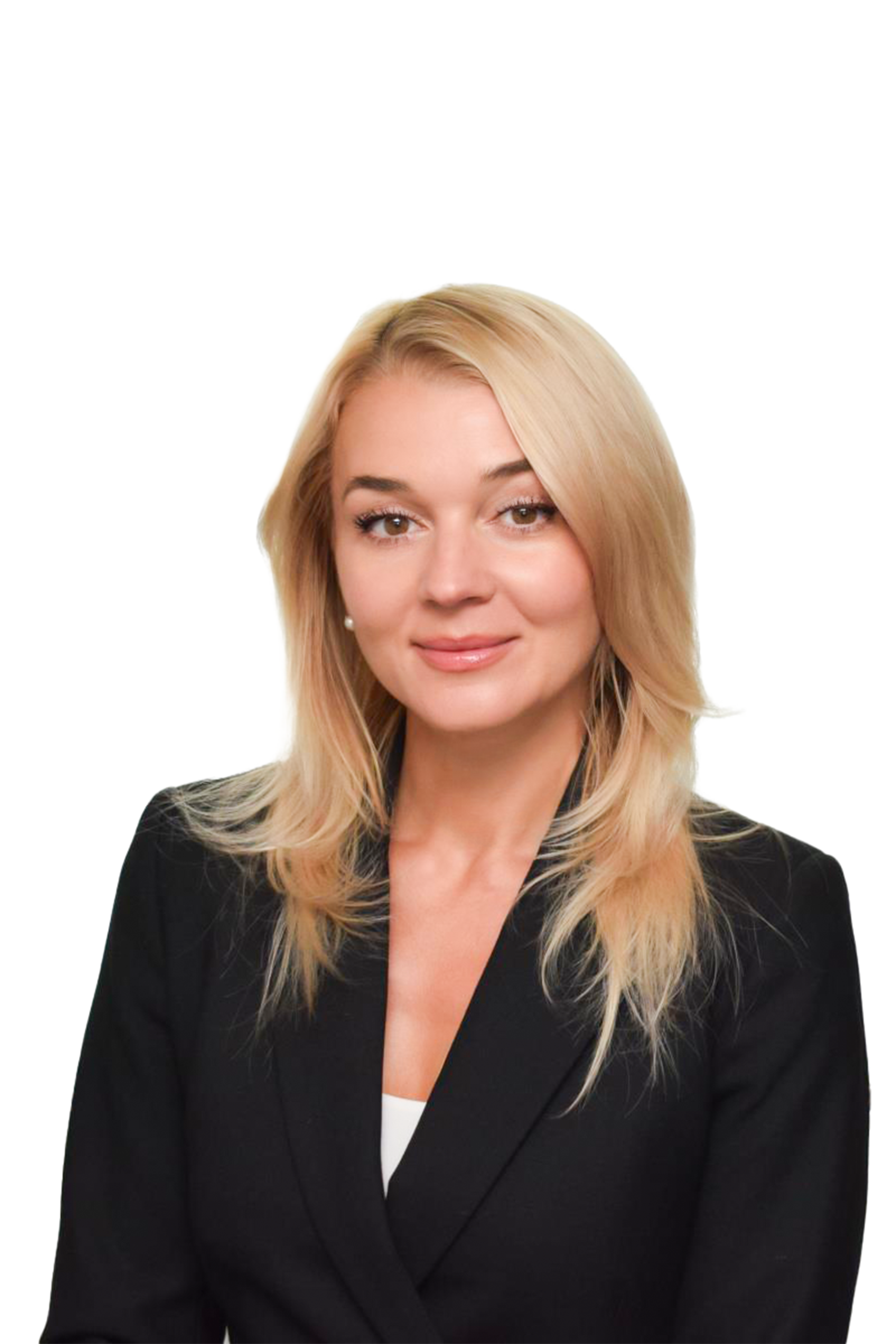
- Born: 4 June 1987 (age 39); Chernivtsi, Ukraine
- Occupation: Political analyst

Aliona Hlivco (Ukrainian: Альона Гливко; born 4 June 1987) is a Ukrainian-British political scientist, former Ukrainian politician, and founder of the St. James's Foreign Policy Group. Also she is known for her commentary on European security, UK–Ukraine relations, and foreign policy. She previously served as Managing Director at the Henry Jackson Society and is a former member of the Ukrainian regional parliament.

== Early life and education ==
Hlivco was born in Chernivtsi, Ukraine on 4 June 1987. She earned a Bachelor's and Master's degree in Political Science and later completed a Master's in Public Administration.

== Career ==
Between 2010 and 2018, Hlivco held several positions in Ukrainian regional and national politics. She was Deputy Head of the Batkivshchyna party's Chernivtsi regional organisation, Campaign Manager in six elections, and served as Chief of Staff to MP Olena Kondratiuk. From 2015 to 2018, she was a member of the Chernivtsi Regional Parliament and a Senior Adviser to its Chairman. In 2014, Hlivco served as an official representative of former Prime Minister Yulia Tymoshenko during the Ukrainian presidential election. She received the Order of Merit in recognition of her support for democracy in Ukraine during the 2013–2014 Revolution of Dignity.

After relocating to the UK, she transitioned into policy advocacy and think tank leadership. From 2023 to 2024, she was Managing Director at the Henry Jackson Society. In 2025, she founded the St. James's Foreign Policy Group, a policy consultancy focusing on European security and transatlantic relations.

Hlivco is a visiting lecturer in the Department of War Studies at King's College London, where she teaches on contemporary warfare. She is a member of the Academic Council of the Wilfried Martens Centre for European Studies and a research fellow at GLOBSEC, a Bratislava based think tank. She also serves on the Advisory Council of the Coalition for Global Prosperity.

== In the media ==
Hlivco is a regular contributor to UK and international media. She has appeared on the BBC, Sky News, Monocle 24, and Deutsche Welle, and has written opinion pieces for The Telegraph, Foreign Policy, The Spectator, ConservativeHome, LBC and the Kyiv Independent.

Aliona Hlivco was one of the co-creators of a cocktail named after the President of Ukraine, Volodymyr Zelenskyy.

== Recognition and awards ==
- Order of Merit, Chernivtsi Regional Parliament (2019)

== Personal life ==
Hlivco currently resides in the United Kingdom and holds dual Ukrainian and British citizenship. Her brother, Valeriy is a commander in a Ukrainian frontline reconnaissance unit.
