= Westminster Medical Society =

The Westminster Medical Society was a London medical discussion group in existence from 1809 to 1850–1, when it merged into the Medical Society of London.

Its founders were Benjamin Brodie and Sir Charles Mansfield Clarke, Baronet. Initially the Society absorbed the membership of the dormant Lyceum Medicum Londinense, founded in 1785 but inactive from about 1805.

Its Presidents included Augustus Bozzi Granville in 1829, when the profile of the Society was high during discussion of gestation period in the Gardner peerage case, in 1846 Henry Hancock, and William Dingle Chowne who worked for the union with the Medical Society of London. John Snow of Westminster Hospital attributed the development of his career to his association with the Society.
