= Leigh Ingham =

British politician

Leigh Ingham MP
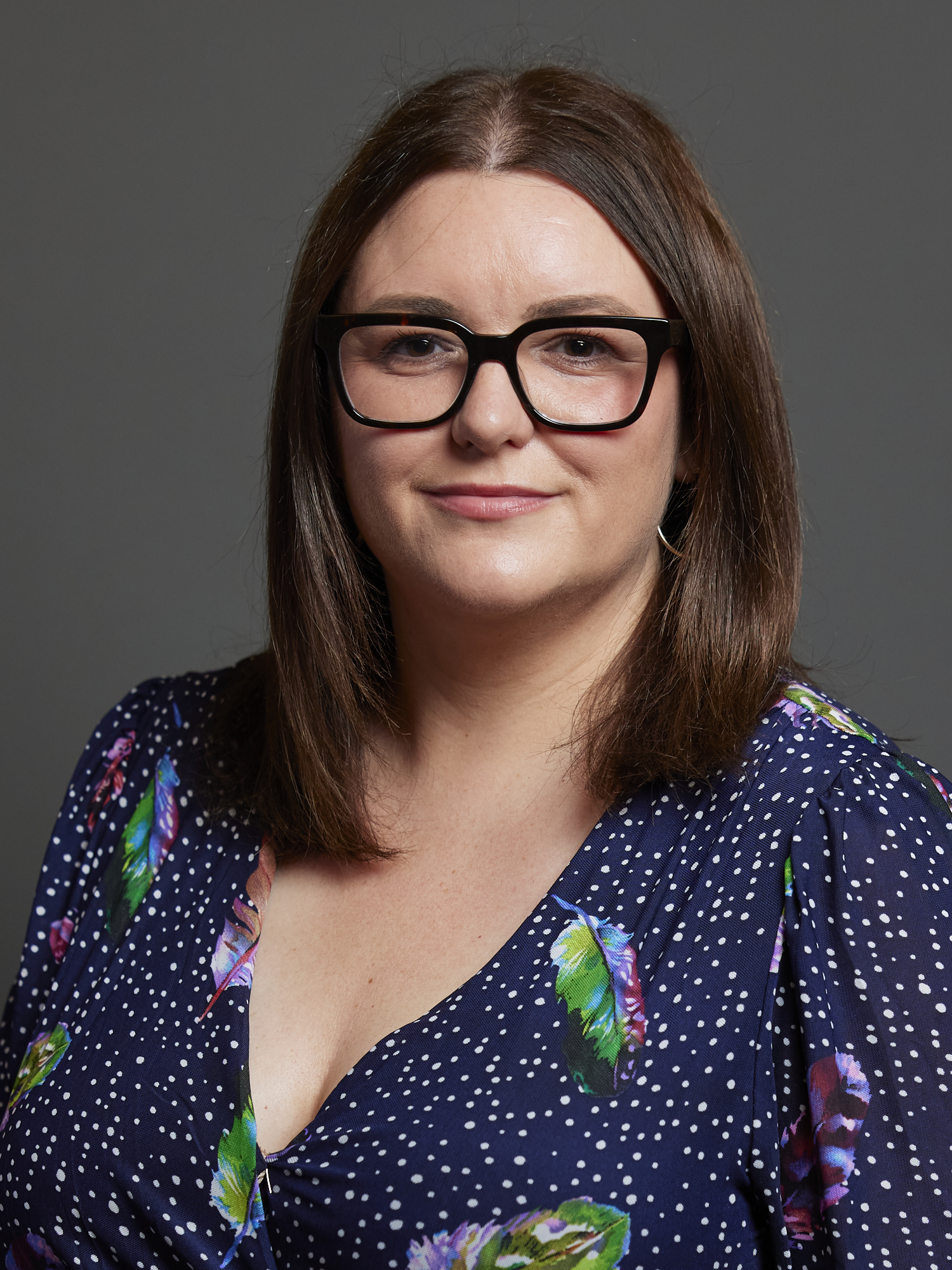
- Official portrait, 2024

Member of Parliament for Stafford
- Incumbent
- Assumed office 4 July 2024
- Preceded by: Theo Clarke
- Majority: 4,595 (10%)

Personal details
- Born: 1984 (age 41–42)
- Party: Labour
- Website: leighingham.co.uk

Leigh Ingham is a British Labour politician who has been the Member of Parliament (MP) for Stafford since 2024. The daughter of a bricklayer and a factory worker, she was born in 1984 and grew up in Burnley. Ingham was the first person in her family to attend university, studying politics at the University of Lincoln. She subsequently studied an MA in Politics (Research) at the University of Nottingham, and an MA in Politics (Parliamentary Studies) at the University of Leeds.

== Early career ==
Ingham has worked in roles across the country in Local Authority, private, and charity sectors, often focussing on Young People.

Before her election, her most recent role was as a Senior Development Consultant at the Education Development Trust, a role she held from 2022 to 2024. Prior to that she worked for Plan International UK as their Wales Development Manager.

== Parliamentary career ==
In July 2024, she was elected as Member of Parliament for Stafford, overturning the previous majority of 14,377 which was held by the Conservative MP Theo Clarke.

Ingham has developed a number of priorities since being elected, including advocating for leaseholders, SEND and inclusivity, High Street regeneration, flooding, improving NHS care, and an "infrastructure first" approach to new housing developments.

=== Local government ===
Prior to becoming an MP, Ingham was elected as a Labour councillor representing the Kingswood ward between 2023 and 2024. During her time on the council, she served as Cabinet member for Communities and Local Place as well as being Deputy Leader for the Labour group. Following the announcement of the 2024 general election, she resigned her seat on the council and was selected as the Labour candidate for Stafford.

=== Advocacy for towns ===
Ingham has campaigned on the disparity in economic growth between towns and cities, arguing that towns have been overlooked in favour of a "cities-first" approach to regional growth policy. In a June 2026 opinion piece, she highlighted that employment growth in UK cities had reached 10.7% over the preceding decade, compared with just 5.4% in towns. She also noted that manufacturing employment is disproportionately concentrated in towns rather than cities.

She raised the same growth disparity in the House of Commons on several occasions in June 2026, including during a debate on private sector investment, and a debate on regional innovation and growth.

Ingham has also campaigned on digital exclusion between cities and towns. In September 2025, while serving as Co-Chair of the All-Party Parliamentary Group on Digital Inclusion, she brought a Google Digital Garage training day to Stafford, saying the aim was to close the gap facing small businesses and residents in towns compared with cities in accessing digital skills support.

=== Business and Trade Select Committee ===
Ingham was added to the Business and Trade Committee on 13 April 2026, replacing Sonia Kumar and Matt Western. The Committee scrutinises the expenditure, administration, and policy of the Department for Business and Trade and its associated public bodies.

As a member of the Committee, Ingham took part in its inquiry into the UK–China economic relationship, questioning witnesses including AstraZeneca's Shaun Grady on the company's investment decisions, in oral evidence sessions in April and June 2026.

Ingham was previously Co-Chair of the All-Party Parliamentary Group for Women and Enterprise, which promotes female entrepreneurship and publishes an annual report on the barriers facing women in business. She is also a member of the All-Party Parliamentary Group on Apprenticeships.

=== Procurement ===
Ingham has campaigned on government procurement policy, arguing that public contracts should give greater weight to companies investing in British manufacturing over those investing in foreign manufacturing. In April 2026 she secured and led a House of Commons Urgent Question on the Government's procurement strategy, questioning the Minister on the use of foreign-made vehicles in the Government Car Service and imported bricks in Homes England-funded housing. Responding, the Minister, Chris Ward, said "There are few greater champions of the buy British agenda than my hon. Friend."

The following day, at Cabinet Office questions, Ingham highlighted GE Vernova's creation of 400 new jobs at its Stafford site and argued that companies already investing in Britain should receive greater consideration when competing for government contracts; the Minister called her "spot on" for championing her local business.

In June 2026, Ingham wrote that "the government must buy British, build British and back British," arguing for increased UK content weighting in government contracts and citing Stafford manufacturers Perkins, GE Vernova, and Bostik as businesses that would benefit.

=== Other committee work ===
Ingham previously served on the Northern Ireland Affairs Committee between October 2024 and November 2025, and on the Speaker's Committee for the Independent Parliamentary Standards Authority. She was also a member of the Institute for Apprenticeships and Technical Education (Transfer of Functions etc) Bill Committee in March 2025.

== Political positions ==
She voted in favour of decriminalising abortion in England and Wales, supporting an amendment to the Crime and Policing Bill, tabled by Labour MP Tonia Antoniazzi, which removed the threat of criminal investigation, arrest, or prosecution for women acting in relation to their own pregnancy. The amendment passed by 379 votes to 137 on 17 June 2025.

On welfare policy, she voted for giving the Department for Work and Pensions greater powers to investigate welfare fraud. In 2026, she voted for scrapping the two-child limit on Universal Credit support, legislation estimated to lift 450,000 children out of poverty.

On immigration, she voted for the provisions of the Border Security Bill, including new immigration-related offences and the scrapping of the Rwanda deportation scheme.

== Constituency work ==
=== Flooding ===
In January 2025, Ingham raised flooding in her constituency with the Prime Minister at Prime Minister's Questions, telling him her constituents were "sick and tired" of homes and businesses flooding, and calling for flood defence investment. In March 2025, she convened the Sandon Road Flooding Taskforce, bringing together the Environment Agency, Severn Trent, and Staffordshire County Council, alongside local business owners, following a public meeting attended by more than 65 residents. The taskforce discussed how a cross-agency approach could best deliver a long-term solution while addressing the flooding in the interim.

=== Health ===
Ingham has submitted written questions to the Department of Health and Social Care on waiting times and geographical coverage of urgent care provision in Staffordshire. Following her campaign, a planning application for a new Urgent Treatment Centre at County Hospital, Stafford, was submitted by the University Hospital of North Midlands NHS Trust in November 2025.

Ingham and neighbouring MP Gareth Snell worked with the University Hospitals of North Midlands NHS Trust to reduce hospital waiting lists in Staffordshire; the trust reported in June 2025 that the number of patients waiting 52 weeks for treatment had fallen by almost 54 per cent.

In a Westminster Hall debate on NHS breast screening in June 2026, Ingham spoke of a recent visit to the newly opened breast care unit at County Hospital, and raised the roll-out of community diagnostic centres.

=== Justice ===
HMP Drake Hall, a women's prison in her constituency, runs the Halfords Academy, training prisoners as cycle mechanics ahead of release. Ingham has raised the support available to prison officers at Drake Hall with the Ministry of Justice in a written question.

Ingham is a member of the Speaker's Conference on the security of candidates, MPs, and elections. In oral evidence given on 2 July 2025, she questioned the Minister for Courts and Legal Services on evidence that courts have sometimes been reluctant to grant anonymity or restraining orders to victims and witnesses because they are MPs, and asked what guidance is given to courts on the issue.

At Justice topical questions on 30 June 2026, Ingham welcomed the Government's £500 million investment in victims' services, highlighting fifty years of work by Staffordshire Women's Aid supporting survivors of sexual and domestic violence in her constituency. Using the opportunity to draw attention to victim support services, where every £1 spent results in £10.80 being returned to the public purse, she asked what steps were being taken to ensure local organisations could access the funding. In response to Ingham's request, the Minister responded that the Staffordshire Police, Fire, and Crime Commissioner was receiving over £4.5 million over two years for victims' support services, in addition to council funding for safe accommodation including refuges run by Women's Aid.

=== Energy and industry ===
At Ingham's invitation, Ed Miliband, the former Secretary of State for Energy Security and Net Zero, visited GE Vernova's Stafford site in February 2026, touring the factory and meeting apprentices. The site, described as the UK's only large-scale grid manufacturing facility, announced an expansion creating around 100 jobs in mid-2025, increasing GE Vernova's Stafford workforce from approximately 1,350 employees.

Ingham successfully campaigned in her constituency for solar panels to be required on new build housing. The government confirmed in 2025 that new homes in England would require solar panels by 2027, as part of a wider Future Homes Standard policy shift.

=== Education ===
Ingham lobbied the Government for Stafford College, part of Newcastle and Stafford Colleges Group (NSCG), to be designated one of four national Advanced Manufacturing Technical Excellence Colleges, a status it secured in April 2026 with backing from the Department for Education. The designation supports a proposed £10 million advanced manufacturing hub near Stafford railway station, expected to be operational by 2030.

Parliament of the United Kingdom
Preceded by Theo Clarke	Member of Parliament for Stafford; 2024–present	Incumbent
