= Sir Charles Shaw, 1st Baronet =

British politician

Sir Charles Shaw

Theodore Frederick Charles Edward Shaw (11 September 1859 – 17 April 1942) was a British Liberal Party politician.

== Background ==
Shaw was the eldest son of Edward Dethick Shaw and Millicent Augusta Gough, both of Wolverhampton. He was educated at Tettenhall College, Wolverhampton and Balliol College, Oxford, where he matriculated in 1886 at age 27.

== Career ==
Shaw was Managing Director and Chairman of John Shaw & Sons Ltd. of Wolverhampton. He was a Member of Wolverhampton Town Council, a Captain in the 3rd Volunteer Battalion of the South Staffordshire Regiment and was Liberal MP for Stafford from 1892 to December 1910.

In 1908, Shaw was created a baronet.

Escutcheon of the Shaw baronets of Wolverhampton

== Private life ==
Shaw married at St Mark's Chapel, North Audley Street, Mayfair, on 17 January 1900, Emily White Bursill, daughter of Henry Bursill, of Hampstead. The couple lived at Charters at Sunningdale in Berkshire, with their two daughters.

Parliament of the United Kingdom
Preceded by Thomas Salt	Member of Parliament for Stafford; 1892–December 1910	Succeeded by Walter Essex
Baronetage of the United Kingdom
New creation	Baronet (of Wolverhampton); 1908–1942	Extinct
Preceded by Roberts baronets	Shaw baronets of Wolverhampton; 30 November 1908	Succeeded by Barker baronets
