= John Newton (MP for Stafford) =

English politician

John Newton (fl. 1378–1391) was an English politician. He sat as MP for Stafford in 1378, 1385, February 1388, September 1388, January 1390, and 1391.

He also served as bailiff of Stafford from 1 November 1385 until 1386.
