= Harry Fenton =

Harry Fenton may refer to:

- Harry E. Fenton of the European Country Music Association
- Harry Fenton (designer) of Royal Doulton Figurines
- Harry Fenton (retailer), defunct British menswear fashion chain
- Harry Fenton, character in Peaky Blinders (TV series)

== See also ==
- Henry Fenton (disambiguation)
