= Walter Essex =

Walter Essex

Sir (Richard) Walter Essex (13 January 1857 – 15 September 1941) was a British businessman and Liberal Party politician.

The eldest son of John Essex, he established the wallpaper printing business Essex & Co. He entered local politics in the Wandsworth area of south London. At the 1900 general election he was selected by the Liberal Party to contest the seat of Lambeth, Kennington, but failed to be elected. At the next general election in 1906 he was elected as Member of Parliament for Cirencester in Gloucestershire. He held the seat until January 1910 when he was defeated by his Conservative opponent, Benjamin Bathurst. He returned to the Commons at the election of December 1910, when he was elected to represent Stafford. He was knighted in 1913 and made an honorary freeman of Stafford. Following a redistribution of seats, Essex stood at the new seat of Stoke-on-Trent, Burslem at the 1918 general election but was not elected.

Essex was married twice. He married Marie Chinchen of Swanage, Dorset in 1881; together they had one daughter. Following her death in 1883, he married Lizzie Benson of Newcastle upon Tyne in 1885, with whom he had another three daughters. Their house facing Tooting Common was originally designed by C. F. A. Voysey in 1897, but when Lady Essex turned down Voysey's later revised design, the house was built by Walter Cave on lines similar to the 1897 version. He died at his home at Bourton on the Water, Gloucestershire in September 1941.

Parliament of the United Kingdom
Preceded by Benjamin Bathurst	Member of Parliament for Cirencester; 1906–1910	Succeeded by Benjamin Bathurst
Preceded by Sir Charles Shaw	Member of Parliament for Stafford; 1910–1918	Succeeded by Hon. William Ormsby-Gore
