= European Foundation (think tank) =

Eurosceptic pressure group

The European Foundation
- Formation: 9 September 1992
- Type: Advocacy group
- Location: London, United Kingdom
- Coordinates: 51.4963°N 0.1284°W
- Website: https://europeanfoundation.org/

The European Foundation is a Eurosceptic think tank based in the United Kingdom, founded in 1992. It is chaired by Sir Bill Cash, a British Conservative MP. The organisation produces the European Journal.

The College Street Group was formed in October 1992 in order to oppose the Maastricht Treaty. The Group, consisting of politicians, academics, businessmen, lawyers, and economists, provided briefs in the campaign to win the arguments both in Parliament and in the country. The European Foundation was created out of Great College Street by Bill Cash after the Maastricht debates. It conducted a campaign in the UK to leave the European Union.

It was reported in 1996 that the European Foundation was being funded by Sir James Goldsmith, the then leader of the British Referendum Party. Because there was an approaching election at which Conservative and Referendum candidates would be contesting the same seats, Cash was forced to sever the link. The shortfall in funding was plugged by Margaret Thatcher, who later became the European Foundation's Patron, a position she held until her death.

== Office holders ==
- Former Patron: Baroness Thatcher
- Chairman: Sir Bill Cash MP
- European Director: Dr Paola del Bigio
- Head of Research and Editor of the European Journal: Margarida Vasconcelos

== Former Office Holders ==
- Iain Duncan Smith
