= John Clarke (physician, 1761–1815) =

English physician and obstetrician

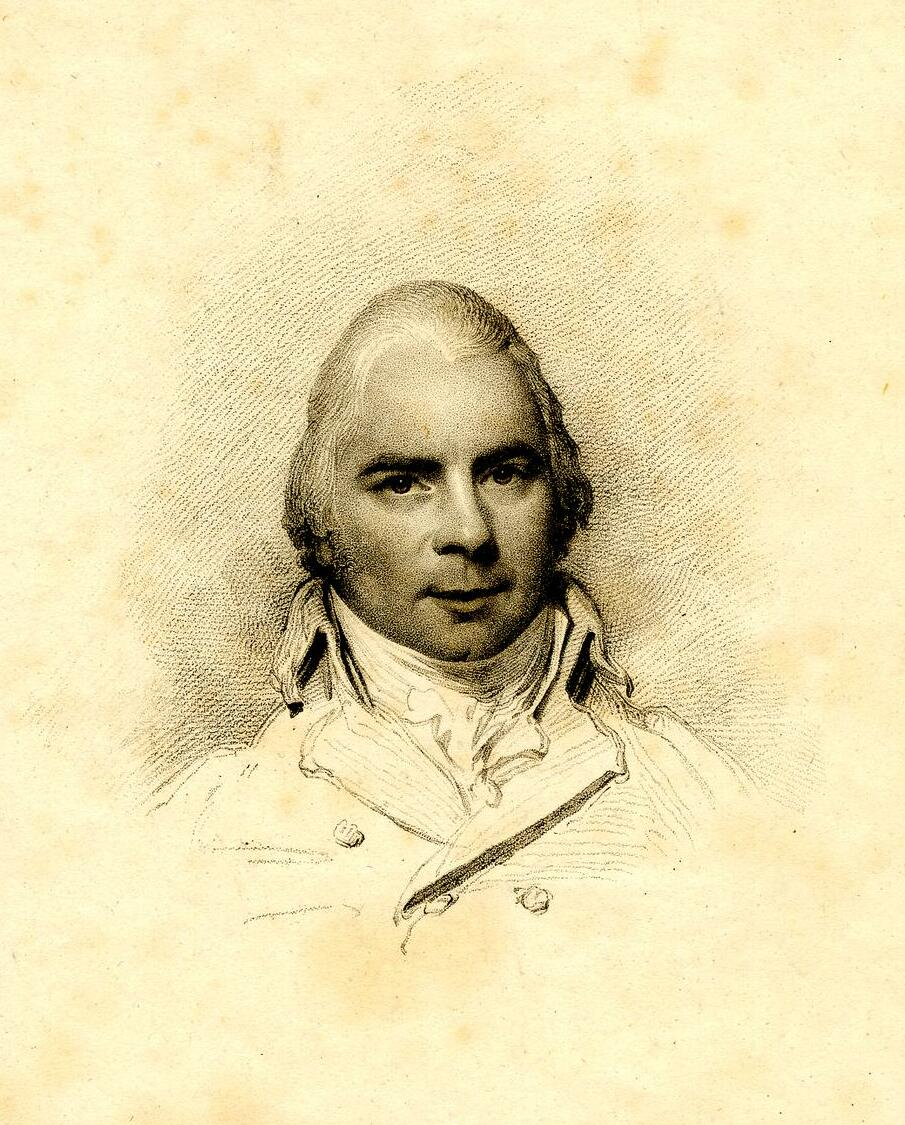
John Clarke Esq^{r}. M.D., stipple engraving, print by Charles Turner, possibly after William Wood (1813)

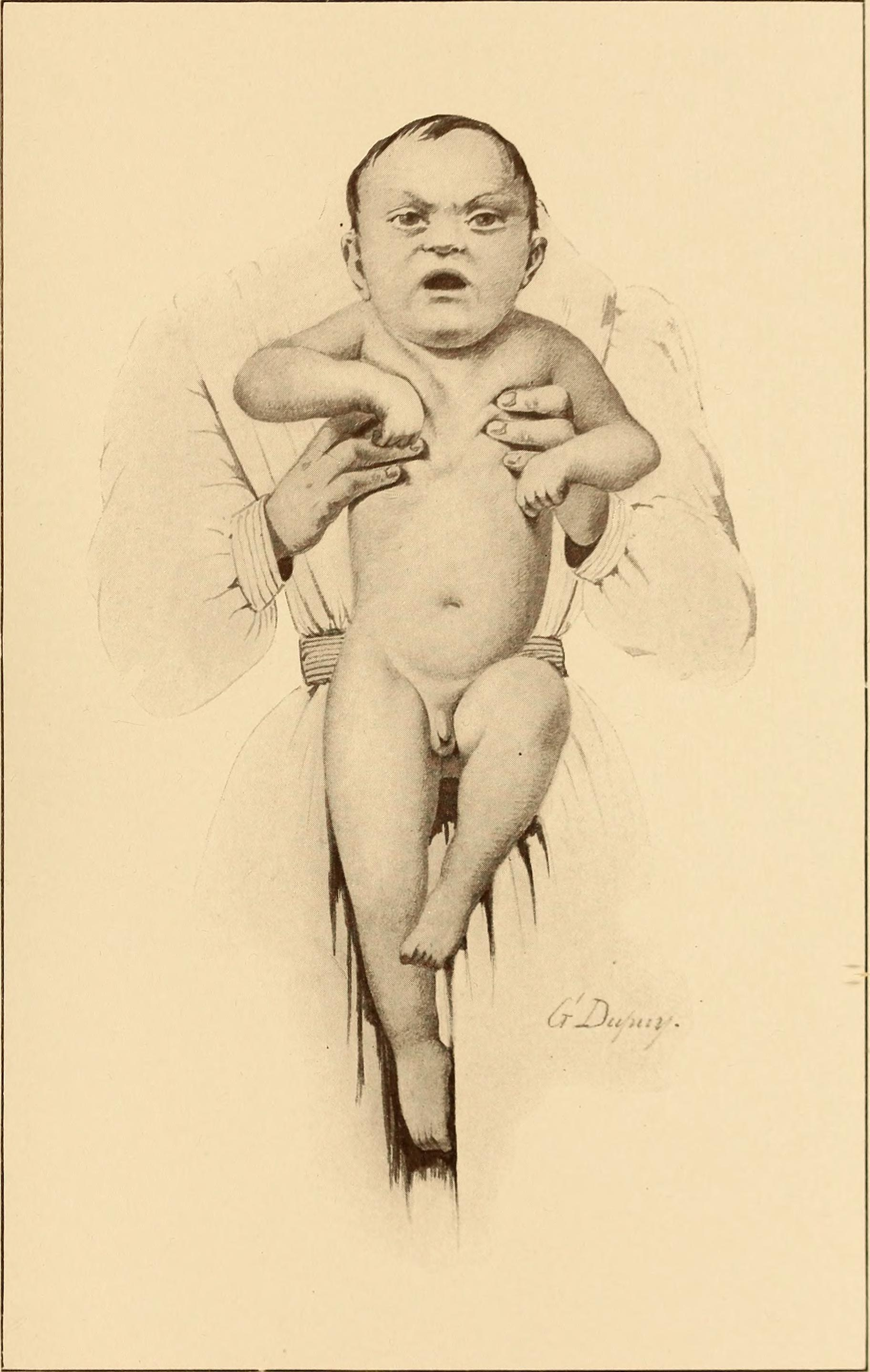
Plate XXXVI. Tetany. Infant nine months of age. Shows the driving position of the fingers, hands, and arms, overextension of the feet and flexion of the toes. (1902)

John Clarke LRCP (1761–1815) was an English physician and obstetrician.

== Life ==
John Clarke, the son of a surgeon of the same name, was born at Wellingborough, Northamptonshire, in 1761. He was educated at St. Paul's School, where he was admitted 6 November 1772, aged 11, and afterwards at St. George's Hospital.

After becoming a member of the Corporation of Surgeons, as the body then separated from the Barbers, but not yet raised to the degree of a college, was called, he began practice in Chancery Lane, and at the same time lectured on midwifery in the private medical school founded by William Hunter. His lectures were popular, and William Munk was told by his brother, Sir Charles Mansfield Clarke, that this was in part due to a custom of illustrating the points of midwifery by familiar analogies.

Clarke received a license in midwifery from the College of Physicians in 1787, and took a Scotch degree. He was the chief midwifery practitioner of London for several years, but later in life gave up midwifery, and, moving to the west end of the town, was consulted on the diseases of women and children. He was also lecturer on midwifery at St. Bartholomew's Hospital.

He died in August 1815.

== Works ==
Besides a paper on a tumour of the placenta, read before the Royal Society, he published three books:

1. An Essay on the Epidemic Disease of Lying-in Women in 1787–8, 4to, London, 1788;
2. Practical Essays on Pregnancy and Labour, and the Diseases of Lying-in Women, 8vo, London, 1793;
3. Commentaries on some of the most important Diseases of Children, 8vo, London, 1815.

The last, of which his death prevented the publication of more than one part, is the work on which his fame rests, and it entitles him to rank as a medical discoverer; for it contains the first exact description of laryngismus stridulus or tetany. This disease, which consists in a sudden onset of difficult breathing, obviously originating in the windpipe, was confused by Boerhaave with asthma, and by later writers with true croup. Its anatomical cause was still unknown in 1887; but Clarke's exact clinical description (Commentaries, chap. iv.) was the first step to a precise study of the affection.
