= John Baxter (MP for Stafford) =

English politician

John Baxter (fl. 1372–1407) was an English politician. He sat as MP for Stafford in 1378, January 1380, November 1384, 1393 and 1395 and bailiff of Stafford c. 1378/9 and 1 November 1406 till 1407.
