= Amelia Lewsham =

Jamaican albino woman and businessperson

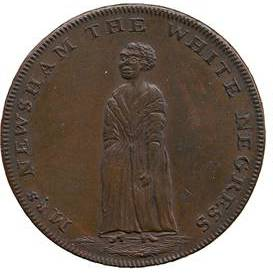
- a 1795 Conder token
- Born: c. 1748; Colony of Jamaica, British Empire
- Died: after 1797; Probably UK
- Other name: "The White Negress"
- Known for: Albinism
- Spouse: Mr Lewsham
- Children: 6

Amelia Lewsham or Amelia Harlequin or Amelia Newsham (c. 1748 – after 1797) was a Jamaican woman born with albinism, enslaved and exhibited as the "White Negress" in London, and subjected to medical and naturalists examination. She freed herself and became eventually a businesswoman successfully making exhibitions by her own.

== Life ==
Lewsham was born circa 1748, in Jamaica, probably Spanish Town where her mother worked as her owner's house servant. Both of her parents were black and she was born an albino. Lewsham was the property of Sir Simon Clarke 6th baronet who was so intrigued with her that he sent Lewsham, then about five years old, to England in 1753 as a present to his second son Kingsmill Clarke, a barrister of the Inner Temple. Clarke agreed to sell the girl after initially asking for 400 guineas.

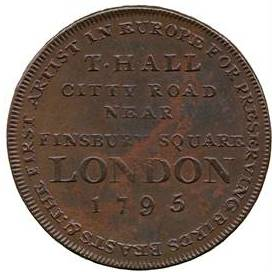
Obverse of the 1795 coin

Her new owner, Burnet, ran a shop in London and he toured the country with Lewsham, charging customers a shilling to see the unusual girl. Burnet showed her to both the Royal Society and the Royal Family and whilst touring she was baptised "Amelia Harleguin" in April 1766. Empowered by the baptism Lewsham left her owner and began exhibiting herself. Amelia married and had six children with a man named Lewsham or Newsham.

Eleven years later she was seen by Olaudah Equiano in London. In 1795 she was being exhibited by Thomas Hall in Finsbury Square and possibly at Bartholomew Fair. Souvenir coins were minted by W. Lutwtyche of Birmingham. The obverse of the coin showed Lewsham with the legend "MRS. NEWSHAM THE WHITE NEGRESS". The reverse read "The First Artist in Europe for Preserving Birds Beasts &c." and "T. Hall Citty Road near Finsbury Square London 1795". An alternative reverse recorded that Thomas Hall was exhibiting Amelia at the "Curiosity House" on City Road.

Lewsham probably died in the UK but the date is not known.
