= Rees Howell Gronow =

Welsh Officer and socialite

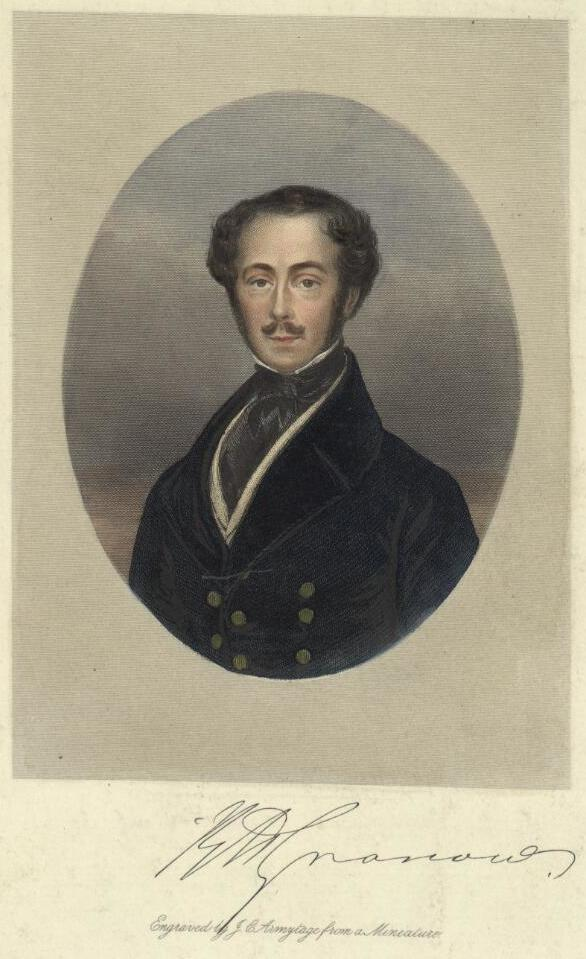

Rees Howell Gronow (1794 – 22 November 1865), "Captain Gronow", was a Welsh Grenadier Guards officer, an unsuccessful parliamentarian, a dandy and a writer of celebrated reminiscences.

== Origins and education ==
He was the eldest son of William Gronow of Court Herbert, Neath, Glamorganshire, who died in 1830, by Anne, only daughter of Rees Howell of Gwrrhyd. He was born on 7 May 1794, and was educated at Eton, where he was intimate with Shelley.

== Army career ==
On 24 December 1812 he received a commission as an ensign in the 1st Battalion 1st Regiment of Foot Guards, and after mounting guard at St. James's Palace for a few months was sent with a detachment of his regiment to Spain. In 1813 he took part in the principal military operations in that country, and in the following year returned with his battalion to London. Here he became one of the dandies of the town, and was among the very few officers who were admitted at Almack's, where he remembered the first introduction of quadrilles and waltzes in place of the old reels and country dances. Wanting money to equip himself for his further services abroad, he obtained an advance of £200 from his agents, Cox & Greenwood, and going with this money to a gambling-house in St. James's Square, he won £600, with which he purchased horses and other necessaries. Sir Thomas Picton then took him out to Flanders as an honorary aide-de-camp but finding no employment for him, he was advised to join the 3rd battalion of his regiment and was subsequently present at Quatre Bras and Waterloo. He entered Paris on 25 June 1815, and on 28 June became a lieutenant and later a captain in his regiment. From this period until 24 October 1821 he continued with his regiment in England, and then retired from the army. On 18 June 1823 he became insolvent, and after some confinement was discharged from Debtors' Prison under the Insolvent Debtors Act.

== Parliamentary career ==
At the 1831 general election, Howell was put forward as a pro-Reform government candidate for Great Grimsby. Gronow was narrowly defeated, with 187 votes against the 192 for John Villiers Shelley and 200 for George Harris, the two victorious Tories. At the subsequent 1832 general election, he was elected for Stafford. His victory was the result of extensive bribery, and a parliamentary investigation in June–July 1833 recommended that the corruption was so "open, general, and systematic" that the constituency should be completely disenfranchised. The bill did not pass the House of Lords, however, with the effect that Gronow remained a member of Parliament until it was dissolved in December 1834. In the 1835 general election, he was defeated by F. L. Holyoake Goodricke, and did not seek election again.

== Literary career ==
For many years after this he resided in London, mixing in the best society. In later years he took up his residence in Paris, where he was present during the coup d'état of 1–2 December 1851. His name is chiefly remembered in connection with his four volumes of reminiscences:

- Reminiscences of Captain Gronow, formerly of the Grenadier Guards and M.P. for Stafford, being Anecdotes of the Camp, the Court, and the Clubs, at the close of the last War with France, related by himself, 1862;
- Recollections and Anecdotes, being a Second Series of Reminiscences, by Captain R. H. Gronow, 1863;
- Celebrities of London and Paris, being a Third Series of Reminiscences and Anecdotes, 1865;
- Captain Gronow's Last Recollections, being the Fourth and Final Series of his Reminiscences and Anecdotes, 1866.

In 1888 appeared The Reminiscences and Recollections of Capt. Gronow. With illustrations from contemporary sources ... by J. Grego. When he relates his personal experiences, as in his account of the state of Paris in 1815, the condition of society in London in his own time, and the doings of the court of Napoleon III, his testimony is to be relied on, but his second-hand stories and anecdotes of persons whom he did not know are of lesser value. Whether reliable or not, his narrative is invariably lively and entertaining.

== Personal characteristics ==
He was a remarkably handsome man, always faultlessly dressed, and was very popular in society. His portrait appeared in shop windows with those of Brummell, the Regent, Alvanley, Kangaroo Cook, and other worthies. With the exception of Captain Ross he was the best pistol shot of his day, and in early life took part in several duels. He married first, in 1825, an opera dancer, Antoinine, daughter of Monsieur Didier of Paris. By his second wife, Amelia Louisa Matilda Rouquet (a Breton aristocrat), whom he married in 1858, aged 63, he had four children. According to the Morning Post, he left his widow and infant children "wholly unprovided for" at his death, aged 70 in Paris on 22 November 1865.
