= Clarke baronets of Salford Shirland (1617) =

Escutcheon of the Clarke baronets of Salford Shirland (1617)

The Clarke Baronetcy, of Salford Shirland in the County of Warwick, was created in the Baronetage of England on 1 May 1617 for Simon Clarke. He later supported the Royalist cause during the Civil War.

The fifth Baronet was convicted of highway robbery. He managed to escape the death penalty but was deported to Jamaica. The 6th baronet owned slaves and a plantation in Jamaica. He sent 5-year-old Amelia Lewsham as a present to his son. The title became either extinct or dormant on the death of the eleventh Baronet in 1898.

== Clarke baronets, of Salford Shirland (1617) ==
- Sir Simon Clarke, 1st Baronet (died c. 1642)
- Sir John Clarke, 2nd Baronet (died c. 1679)
- Sir Simon Clarke, 3rd Baronet (1635–1687)
- Sir Simon Clarke, 4th Baronet (c. 1662–1718)
- Sir Simon Peter Clarke, 5th Baronet (died 1736)
- Sir Simon Clarke, 6th Baronet (died 1770), Jamaican plantation owner
- Sir Simon Clarke, 7th Baronet (1727–1777) buried in Jamaica
- Sir Philip Haughton Clarke, 8th Baronet (1761–1798)
- Sir Simon Haughton Clarke, 9th Baronet (1764–1832)
- Sir Simon Haughton Clarke, 10th Baronet (1818–1849)
- Sir Philip Haughton Clarke, 11th Baronet (1819–1898)

== Extended family ==
Henry Stephenson Clarke (1839–1919), a descendant of Woodchurch Clarke, younger son of the first Baronet, was a Colonel in the Royal Artillery. His grandson Sir Ashley Clarke was Ambassador to Italy between 1953 and 1962.

== Notes ==
Baronetage of England
| Preceded by Townshend baronets | Clarke baronets 1 May 1617 | Succeeded by Fitton baronets |
