= Bill Cash =

British politician (born 1940)

Sir Bill Cash CH
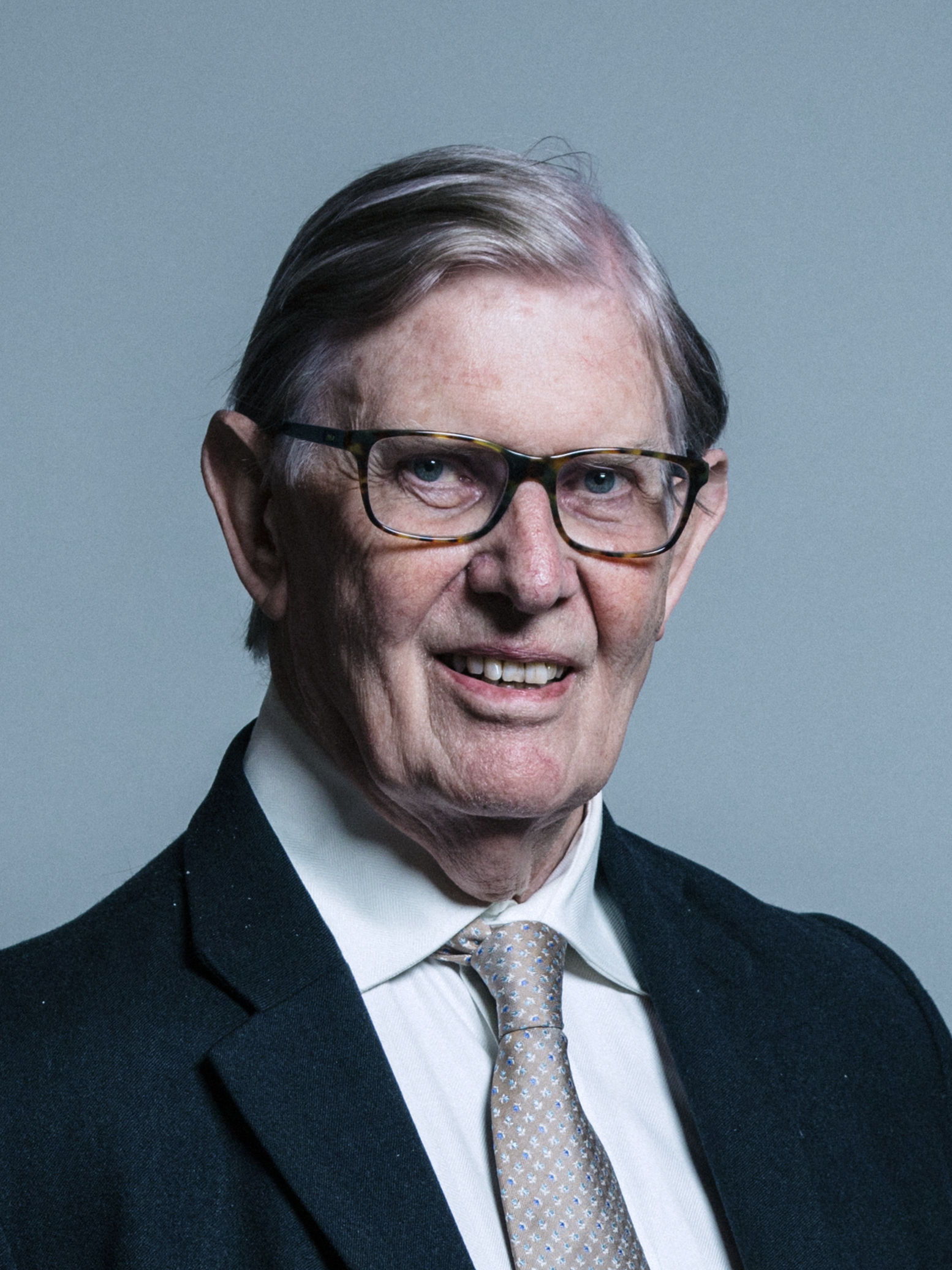
- Official portrait, 2017

Chair of the European Scrutiny Committee
- In office 8 September 2010 – 30 May 2024
- Preceded by: Michael Connarty
- Succeeded by: Committee abolished

Shadow Secretary of State for Constitutional Affairs
- In office 1 July 2003 – 10 November 2003
- Leader: Iain Duncan Smith
- Preceded by: Position established
- Succeeded by: Alan Duncan

Shadow Attorney General for England and Wales
- In office 14 September 2001 – 10 November 2003
- Leader: Iain Duncan Smith
- Preceded by: Edward Garnier
- Succeeded by: Dominic Grieve

Member of Parliament
- In office 3 May 1984 – 30 May 2024
- Preceded by: Hugh Fraser
- Succeeded by: Constituency abolished
- Constituency: Stafford (1984–1997); Stone (1997–2024)

Personal details
- Born: William Nigel Paul Cash; 10 May 1940 (age 86) Finsbury, London, England
- Party: Conservative
- Spouse: Bridget Lee (m. 1965)
- Children: 3, including William
- Education: Lincoln College, Oxford

Sir William Nigel Paul Cash CH (born 10 May 1940) is a British politician who served as a member of Parliament (MP) from 1984 to 2024. A member of the Conservative Party, he was first elected for Stafford and then for Stone in Staffordshire in 1997. Cash is a prominent Eurosceptic. Following his tenth election victory in the 2019 general election, aged 79, Cash became the oldest sitting member of the House of Commons.

Cash was the founder of the Maastricht Referendum Campaign in the early 1990s, and was the elected Chair of the House of Commons' European Scrutiny Committee. He has also served as a vice-president of the Eurosceptic pressure group Conservatives for Britain, and to this day is one of the strongest critics of the European Union from the Conservative Party. In June 2023, he announced his intention to stand down at the 2024 general election.

Cash was appointed a Knight Bachelor in the 2014 Birthday Honours for political services. He was appointed to the Order of the Companions of Honour in Boris Johnson's resignation honours.

== Education ==
Cash was born in Finsbury, London, to a political family, which included seven Liberal Members of Parliament, including John Bright.

Cash grew up in Sheffield and was privately educated at Stonyhurst College in Lancashire before attending Lincoln College, Oxford, from where he graduated with a BA in History. He qualified as a solicitor in 1967, and since 1979 has practised as a solicitor on his own account (i.e. he is neither employed by a law firm nor is he a member of a partnership).

== Family ==
Cash married Bridget Mary (née Lee) at Wardour Castle Chapel in Wiltshire on 16 October 1965, and they have two sons and a daughter. His son is the journalist William Cash.

Along with his wife, Sir William Cash restored the now Grade I Upton Cressett Hall in the 1970s. The Hall was subsequently voted the 'Best Hidden Gem' heritage destination in the UK at the 2011 Hudson's Heritage awards.

He is a distant cousin of the American country musician and singer Johnny Cash.

== Parliament ==
Cash entered Parliament in 1984, when he was elected as MP for Stafford at a by-election in May following the death of Sir Hugh Fraser. From the 1997 election until he retired from parliament at the 2024 general election he was MP for Stone, Staffordshire. Stone was a then newly (re-)created constituency, the previous version of which (with slightly different boundaries) had been abolished in 1950.

He was chairman of various parliamentary committees. He was elected unopposed as Chairman of the European Scrutiny Committee on 8 September 2010, and was a member of the Select Committee on European Legislation after 1985. Cash was elected chairman of the Conservative Backbench Committee on European Affairs (1989–91).

In June 2023, he was one of six Conservative MPs to vote against censuring Boris Johnson following the Commons Privileges Committee investigation. By contrast, 354 MPs voted to approve the Committee's report.

== International affairs ==
Cash was chairman of a number of All-Party African committees, including those on Kenya and Uganda. He was also chairman of the All-Party Committee on Malaysia. He has also served as chairman on the All-Party Group for the Jubilee 2000 (1997–2000).

He was chairman of the All-Party Sanitation and Water Committee (Third World) in which he worked closely with Wateraid and Tearfund. He introduced the Gender Equality (International Development) Bill 2013, which, although only 18th in the Private Members Ballot, was enacted in March 2014.

Mariella Frostrup wrote in The Times, "The new law that puts gender equality at the heart of our overseas aid policy will be as historic as the Slave Trade Act." Justine Greening, Secretary of State for International Development, wrote in The Telegraph blog "Yet for assiduously steering his Gender Equality in International Development Bill through Parliament over recent months, Bill Cash deserves the recognition of women everywhere. … It's also a proud legacy for a Parliamentary champion of women's rights [..] Bill Cash." The day after the Act came into force, the Prime Minister, David Cameron, told Cash in the House of Commons, "I am sure the whole House will want to join me in commending my hon. Friend on his Bill, and on his legislative achievement to get that important measure on the statute book."

== Euroscepticism and the Maastricht Rebellion ==
Cash is known as a strong Eurosceptic. He has been described by Kenneth Clarke as the most "Eurosceptic" Member of Parliament. In the book by historian Robert Blake titled The Conservative Party: from Peel to Major, Cash is described as the leader of the Eurosceptics during the Maastricht Rebellion and as being "indefatigable... a constitutional lawyer of great expertise".

The 'Maastricht Rebellion' took place in the early 1990s, and reached its height in 1993. MPs belonging to the governing Conservative Party refused to support the government of John Major in the votes in the House of Commons on the issue of the implementation of the Maastricht Treaty (Treaty on European Union) in British law. It was a major event of John Major's troubled second term as Prime Minister (1992–1997). Major's party had a small majority, thus giving the relatively small number of rebels great influence: for example, there were 22 rebels on the second reading of the European Communities (Amendment) Bill in May 1992, and the government's majority at the time was only 18. The rebellion (as Major later complained in his memoirs) had the support of the former Prime Minister Margaret Thatcher and Lord Tebbit. Thatcher declared in a speech in the House of Lords that she "could never have signed that Treaty" and that it was "a recipe for national suicide".

In 1993, Cash founded and remains chairman of the eurosceptic European Foundation which was created during the Maastricht Rebellion, the funding for which he organised. During 1994–1995 Cash was a member of the Tindemans group. He was secretary of the European Reform Forum, and has been vice-president of the Conservative Small Business Bureau.

After fellow Maastricht rebel Iain Duncan Smith became leader of the Conservatives, Cash was appointed to the post of shadow Attorney general in 2001, and in 2003 he was Shadow Secretary of State for Constitutional Affairs, but he returned to the backbenches later that year after Duncan Smith was ousted as party leader.

In April 2019, Cash was in favour of a "No-deal" option as a negotiating position for Britain leaving the European Union.

== Writing ==
In November 2011, Cash published a biography of John Bright, whom he described as "one of the greatest parliamentarians of all time", to coincide with the 200th anniversary of Bright's birth. The biography was received with critical acclaim: reviewer Andrew Roberts notes that Bright's legacy "was largely forgotten until this first-class, encapsulating biography". Amanda Foreman states that "Bill Cash not only breathes new life into Bright but delivers an entirely fresh view of both the man himself and his stance as the professional scourge of the upper classes. Bright was always his country’s greatest critic, and yet also its greatest parliamentarian. This and all the other contradictions that made up Bright’s character receive their full due in Cash's nuanced portrait."

In addition to his historical writing, Cash has also published a number of books, pamphlets and essays on Britain's relationship with the European Union, and the Eurosceptic movement. These include: It's the EU, Stupid (2011), The Challenge for the Conservative Party: The future for Britain and Europe (2004), Associated, Not Absorbed: The Associated European Area: a constructive alternative to a single European state (2000), Visions of Europe (Duckworth, 1993) and Against a Federal Europe: The Battle for Britain (Duckworth, 1991).

== Expenses claims ==
On 28 May 2009, it was reported that Cash had claimed £15,000 which he paid his daughter, Laetitia Cash, a prospective Conservative candidate, as rent for a Notting Hill flat, when he had a mortgaged flat of his own a few miles away, which his son Sam Cash was staying in rent-free. "It was only for a year, she was getting married, she wasn't there. My other flat wasn't round the corner, it was in Westminster. It was done through the rules", he said on Newsnight. The following day Cash announced that he had agreed to pay the money back. Cash rejected calls for his resignation and said he was hopeful of getting a fair hearing. David Cameron was said to have ordered Cash to co-operate or risk having the Conservative whip withdrawn. Cash was cleared on appeal in February 2010 by former High Court judge and President of the Court of Appeal, the Rt Hon Sir Paul Kennedy.

Cash faced a no-confidence vote by secret ballot by his constituency party on 2 July 2009. He was, however, re-selected with the support over 98% of the vote. Cash also received a personal letter of support from Conservative leader Cameron before the meeting thanking Cash for "the tireless contribution you make to the work of Parliament. You have a long record of serving your constituents with commitment and integrity." Kennedy, in his letter to Cash regarding his appeal, wrote: "In my judgment there are special reasons why it would not be fair and equitable to require repayment of any money. They are that in 2004–05 you paid rent for accommodation. Such rent was recoverable under the Rules as they existed at the time unless there was some evidence of impropriety. There is no such evidence in your case."

== In popular culture ==
Cash was portrayed by actor Richard Durden in the 2019 HBO and Channel 4 produced drama entitled Brexit: The Uncivil War.

== Publications ==
- Black, A & C. "Who's Who". Who's Who (London 1849). London (annual). ISSN 0083-937X.
- Cash, William (1991). Against a Federal Europe – The Battle for Britain. London: Duckworth. ISBN 978-0-7156-2398-5.
- Cash, William (1992). Europe: the Crunch. London. ISBN 978-0-7156-2450-0.
- Cash, William (1993). Visions of Europe. London: Duckworth.
- Cash, William (2000). Associated, Not Absorbed: The Associated European Area: a constructive alternative to a single European state. London.
- Cash, Bill (2004). The Challenge for the Conservative Party: The future for Britain and Europe.
- Cash, Bill (November 2011). John Bright: Statesman, Orator, Agitator. IB Tauris. ISBN 978-1-84885-996-8.
- Cash, Bill (2011). It's the EU, Stupid. London.

Parliament of the United Kingdom
Preceded by Hugh Fraser	Member of Parliament for Stafford; 1984–1997	Succeeded by David Kidney
New constituency	Member of Parliament for Stone; 1997–2024	Constituency abolished
Political offices
Preceded by Edward Garnier	Shadow Attorney General; 2001–2003	Succeeded by Dominic Grieve
New office	Shadow Secretary of State for Constitutional Affairs; 2003	Succeeded by Alan Duncan
Honorary titles
Preceded by Dennis Skinner	Oldest sitting Member of Parliament; 2019–2024	Succeeded by Sir Roger Gale
