= Orme Bigland Clarke =

Orme Bigland Clarke, 4th Baronet CBE (8 October 1880 in Calcutta, India – 31 March 1949) was a British lawyer and military officer.

== Biography ==
He was the son of Frederick Clarke, second son of Sir Charles Clarke, 2nd Baronet, and Adelaide Catherine Kerrison. He was educated at Eton College, Berkshire and Magdalen College, Oxford University. He was called to the bar at the Inner Temple, in 1906. As a lawyer, he worked under Sir John Simon for 8 years after being called to the bar.

== Military and legal career ==
He was invested as a Commander of the Order of the British Empire (CBE). He succeeded to the title of 4th Baronet Clarke, of Dunham Lodge, Norfolk, on 22 April 1932 from his uncle General Sir Charles Mansfield Clarke, 3rd Baronet GCB GCVO (13 December 1839 – 22 April 1932).

Sir Orme is credited with helping implement the foundation of the Palestinian Legal system. According to Dan Izenberg in his article: "Founding Father"(see Sources), author Natan Brun writes in his "Judges and Jurists in the Land of Israel" that Clarke was responsible for a large part of the legal framework. Izenburg states that "the seeds of the modern Supreme Court were sown on December 9, 1917, when Allenby entered Jerusalem and declared martial law." Clarke, who had enlisted in 1916, had been in the Middle East in 1914 before war broke out as an adviser to the Ottoman Empire. When he was enlisted he was sent to Cairo then onto Jerusalem where Allenby appointed Clarke as the man to implement a judicial system. Izenberg states that according to Brun: "he served as minister of justice, legal adviser to the government and chief prosecutor."

Whilst in Palestine he fell ill with a serious case of malaria and returned to England, resigning from the army.

Izenberg sums up Clarke's career in Palestine: "In time, his unique contribution to the establishment of the rule of law in Palestine was largely forgotten. But closer to his own day......all credited Clarke with establishing a modern judicial system in Palestine."

== Personal life ==
He lived at Bibury Court, Gloucestershire.

Clarke married American Elfrida Roosevelt, granddaughter of James Alfred Roosevelt and Augustus Lowell, on 19 June 1905. They had three sons, including a set of twins. His second son died at age 2. Upon his death the Baronetcy passed to his eldest son, Sir Humphrey Orme Clarke, 5th Bt.

Baronetage of the United Kingdom
| Preceded by Charles Clarke | Baronet (of Dunham Lodge, Norfolk); 1932 – 1949 | Succeeded by Humphrey Orme Clarke |
