= Coalition for Global Prosperity =

London-based not-for-profit campaign group

The Coalition for Global Prosperity is a London-based not-for-profit campaign group that brings together community, political, military, and faith leaders in support of Great Britain and Northern Ireland's role in international aid and development.

== Origin and focus ==
The Coalition for Global Prosperity (CGP) was founded by Conservative MP Theo Clarke in 2017. The group promotes the image of Britain as still having a significant leading role to play in international aid and development with the motto “Britain as a force for good” in the world. The group calls for “a strong aid budget and an active diplomatic and defence strategy.” When the 2019 United Nations’ Sustainable Development Goals Progress Report revealed that no country was on track to achieve the Global Goals by 2030, the all-party parliamentary group for UN Global Goals met with the CGP and other agencies in Westminster, to identify ways that business and government might step up the efforts to deliver on the Global Goals in the Decade of Action.

== Supporters ==
A wide range of prominent individuals pledge their support for the Coalition, such as Bill Gates and Gordon Brown as well as former Prime Minister Theresa May, former Chief Rabbi (Baron) Jonathan Sacks and comedian Lenny Henry, all of whom appear on the CGP website.

The Coalition's Advisory Council includes Nosheena Mobarik, Aliona Hlivco, Lieutenant Colonel Dean Canham OBE, Canon Sarah Snyder, and Professor Sir Myles Wickstead, among others.
