= Richard Stanford (Stafford MP) =

English politician

Richard Stanford (fl. 1382–1402), of Stafford, was an English politician.

He was a member (MP) of the parliament of England for Stafford in May 1382, 1386, September 1388, 1391, 1399 and 1402.
