= 1984 Stafford by-election =

UK parliamentary by-election

- 3 May 1984
Candidate	Bill Cash	David Dunn	Michael Poulter
Party	Conservative	SDP	Labour
Popular vote	18,713	14,733	12,677
Percentage	40.4%	31.8%	27.4%
MP before election
Hugh Fraser
Conservative
Subsequent MP
Bill Cash
Conservative

The 1984 Stafford by-election was a parliamentary by-election held on 3 May 1984 for the House of Commons constituency of Stafford.

== Previous MP ==
The seat fell vacant when the constituency's Conservative Member of Parliament (MP), Major Sir Hugh Charles Patrick Joseph Fraser MBE (23 January 1918 – 6 March 1984) died. Fraser was then one of Parliament's most senior members, having served over 38 years in the House of Commons.

Fraser was educated at Ampleforth College, Balliol College, Oxford, where he was President of the Oxford Union, and at the Sorbonne. He was commissioned into the Lovat Scouts in 1936 and during World War II saw service in North Africa and Europe; he retired in the 1950s with the rank of Major.

Fraser was elected Member of Parliament for Stone in 1945, later Stafford and Stone following constituency boundary changes, from 1950 until 1983, and then Stafford until his death.

== Candidates ==
Four candidates were nominated. The list below is set out in descending order of the number of votes received at the by-election.

1. The Conservative candidate was William Nigel Paul Cash (born on 10 May 1940), a solicitor.

After winning the by-election, he served continuously in the House of Commons until standing down in 2024, and was the oldest sitting member between 2019 and 2024. Cash represented Stafford until boundary changes took effect in 1997, and then represented the constituency of Stone until his retirement.

2. The Social Democratic Party (SDP) candidate, representing the SDP–Liberal Alliance, was David Joseph Dunn. He was a senior lecturer in International Relations, at the time of the by-election. He was born in 1946 and had contested the seat in the 1983 general election.

3. Michael John David Poulter was the Labour candidate. He worked as a senior probation officer and was born in 1942. He contested Stafford and Stone in 1979 and this constituency in 1983.

4. Christopher David Teasdale was an independent, using the ballot paper label "Soon to be unemployed".

== Result ==
The Conservative Party held the seat with a reduced majority.

1984 by-election: Stafford
Party	Candidate	Votes	%	±%
Conservative	Bill Cash	18,713	40.4	−10.8
SDP	David Dunn	14,733	31.8	+7.1
Labour	Michael Poulter	12,677	27.4	+3.7
Independent	C. Teasdale	210	0.4	New
Majority		3,980	8.6	−17.8
Turnout		46,333	65.6	−10.9
Conservative hold		Swing		
Registered electors		70,635		

== See also ==
- Stafford constituency
- Lists of United Kingdom by-elections
- United Kingdom by-election records

== Sources ==
- Britain Votes/Europe Votes By-Election Supplement 1983-, compiled and edited by F.W.S. Craig (Parliamentary Research Services 1985)
