= Henry Fenton (MP) =

English politician

Henry Fenton (fl. 1416) of Stafford, was an English politician.

He was a member (MP) of the parliament of England for Stafford in March 1416.
