= Lawrence Clarke (hurdler) =

British hurdler (born 1990)

Sir Lawrence Clarke Bt OLY
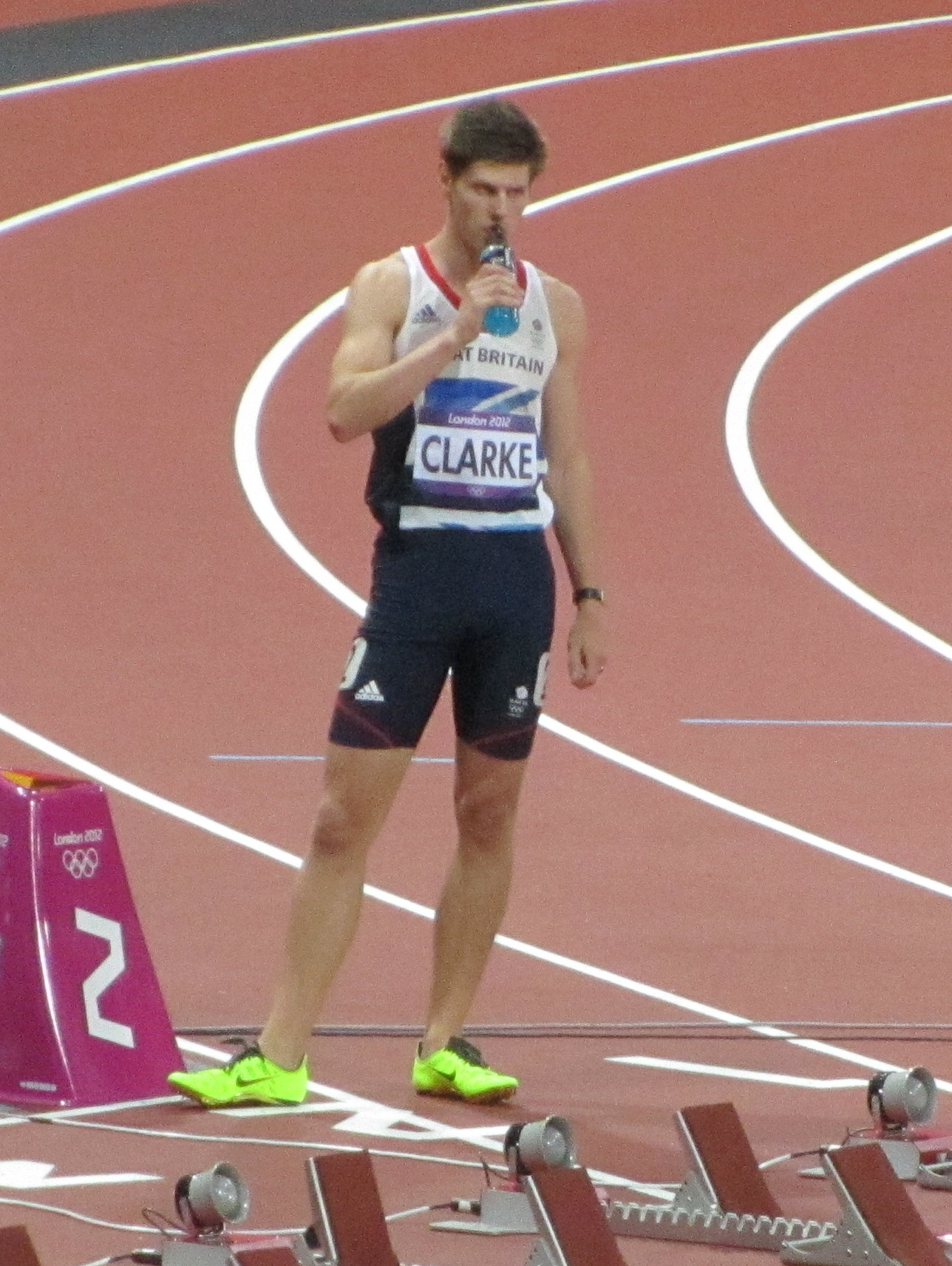
- Clarke at the 2012 Summer Olympics

Personal information
- Nationality: British (English)
- Born: 12 March 1990 (age 36) Westminster, London, England
- Height: 1.87 m (6 ft 1 1/2 in)
- Weight: 77 kg (170 lb; 12.1 st)

Sport
- Sport: Athletics
- Event: 110 m hurdles
- Club: US Créteil-Lusitanos, Windsor, Slough, Eton and Hounslow Athletic Club

Achievements and titles
- Personal bests: 110 m hurdles (U20): 13.37; 60 m Hurdles: 7.59; 110 m hurdles: 13.31/13.14w
Medal record
Representing Great Britain
European Athletics Junior Championships
Gold medal – first place	2009 Novi Sad	110 m hurdles
European Athletics U23 Championships
Bronze medal – third place	2011 Ostrava	110 m hurdles
Representing England
Commonwealth Games
Bronze medal – third place	2010 Delhi	110 m hurdles

Sir Charles Lawrence Somerset Clarke, 7th Baronet (born 12 March 1990), is a former professional 110 m hurdler who finished fourth in the London Olympic Games final. He served as captain of the Great Britain athletics team at the 2015 European Athletics Indoor Championships. He is the son of Sir Tobias "Toby" Clarke, 6th Baronet, and succeeded to the baronetcy on his father's death in 2019. As of 2022, he is a hedge fund manager.

== Education ==
Born in Westminster, London, Clarke was educated at two independent schools: at Summer Fields School in the city of Oxford and Eton College in Berkshire. He went on to study theology and religious studies at the University of Bristol, gaining a Second class honours, upper division (2:1). He studied at the University of Bath for a master's degree in management with a specialisation in absolute return.

== Family ==
Clarke is the son of Sir Tobias "Toby" Clarke, 6th Baronet and his sister is Theo Clarke, formerly a United Kingdom MP. Clarke's maternal grandfather was the Conservative MP Somerset de Chair. He takes his name Lawrence from his American ancestor Abbott Lawrence. He is also a distant relative of the American Roosevelt family.

== Junior athletics career ==
Clarke was in fourth place in the 110 m hurdles at the 2008 Commonwealth Youth Games in Pune, India. He was also the British University (BUCS) champion in the 60 m hurdles (2009) with a time of 7.83 seconds and 110 m Champion (2010) in a time of 13.85 seconds.

Clarke held the No. 1 spot on the British All Time list for the Under 20 men's 3"3 110 m hurdles until 23 May 2010. He established a new National Junior Record with a personal best of 13.37 seconds whilst also winning gold at European Junior Athletics Championships in July 2009, in Novi Sad, Serbia.

== Senior athletics career ==
In June 2010, Clarke won the UK National Under-23 Title in a wind-assisted time (+2.5 m/s) of 13.60secs. He successfully defended this title in June 2011 in his season debut that year.

On 8 October 2010, Clarke won the bronze medal at the XIX Commonwealth Games in New Delhi. He finished third behind two other English hurdlers: Andy Turner (2010 European Champion) and William Sharman. It is the first time in history that England have completed a 1-2-3 clean sweep in the 110 m hurdles.

Clarke became national champion when he won the UK Senior 110 m hurdles title in 13.58s in July 2011, earning him a place on the UK team at the World Championships in Daegu.

He competed at the 2011 World Athletics Championships in Daegu, South Korea where he went out in the first round with a time of 13.65s (-0.2 m/s). The winner of his heat was Jason Richardson who went on to win the Championships after Dayron Robles, the 2008 Olympic champion and world record holder, was disqualified after the final.

== 2012 Summer Olympics ==
On 24 June 2012, he achieved selection for Great Britain in the 2012 Summer Olympics in London. He ran a new personal best of 13.31 (-0.5 m/s) in his Olympic semi final on 8 August. As a result, he qualified as the only European for the 110 m men's hurdles final as a fastest loser. Running from lane 2 in the final he finished an unexpected fourth place with a time of 13.39 seconds beating the 2009 world champion, Ryan Brathwaite, into fifth.

== Post London ==
He broke his wrist in the winter of 2012 followed by a series of hamstring tears that saw him miss high level competition in 2013. He returned to International competition in 2014 finishing eighth at the Glasgow Commonwealth Games. Two weeks later he competed at the European Athletics Championships in Zurich only to tear his hamstring five minutes before the call room for the final.

In March 2015, he was appointed team captain of Great Britain at the European Athletics Indoor Championships in Prague. He finished fifth in the 60 m hurdles. That summer, he competed at the IAAF World Athletics Championships in the Bird's Nest Stadium in Beijing, exiting in the semi-finals. He also won the national title for the second time at the 2015 British Athletics Championships.

After the World Championships, he made the decision to leave Malcolm Arnold and Bath and moved to Paris to train with Giscard Samba Koundys and Dimitri Bascou; at the IAAF World Indoor Championships in Portland, Oregon, U.S. in March 2016, he just missed out on the men's 60 m hurdles final, while Bascou won the bronze medal.

In July 2016, he was selected to represent Great Britain at the 2016 Summer Olympics in Rio de Janeiro, Brazil. He finished 11th, missing out on the final by 0.05s.

In 2016, he joined Citigroup, before becoming managing director at Prelude Capital in 2022.

== Personal bests ==
Event	Best	Location	Date
60 metres hurdles	7.59s	Mondeville, France	7 February 2015
110 metres hurdles	13.31s	London, England	8 August 2012
110 metres hurdles (wind assisted)	13.14s (+4.7 m/s)	Madrid, Spain	7 July 2012

== International competitions ==
Year	Competition	Venue	Position	Event	Notes
2008	Commonwealth Youth Games	Pune, India	4th	110 m hurdles (99 cm)	14.23
2009	European Junior Championships	Novi Sad, Serbia	1st	110 m hurdles (99 cm)	13.37
2010	Commonwealth Games	Delhi, India	3rd	110 m hurdles	13.70
2011	European Indoor Championships	Paris, France	4th, SF 2	60 m hurdles	7.74
2011	European U23 Championships	Ostrava, Czech Republic	3rd	110 m hurdles	13.62
2011	World Championships	Daegu, South Korea	5th, Heat 2	110 m hurdles	13.65
2012	Olympic Games	London, United Kingdom	4th	110 m hurdles	13.31
2014	Commonwealth Games	Glasgow, United Kingdom	8th	110 m hurdles	13.84
2014	European Championships	Zurich, Switzerland	DNS, Final	110 m hurdles	-
2015	European Indoor Championships	Prague, Czech Republic	5th	60 m hurdles	7.63
2015	World Championships	Beijing, China	8th, SF 3	110 m hurdles	13.53
2016	World Indoor Championships	Portland, United States	10th	60 m hurdles	7.65
2016	Olympic Games	Rio de Janeiro, Brazil	11th	110 m hurdles	13.46

Baronetage of the United Kingdom
Preceded by Sir Tobias "Toby" Clarke	Baronet of Dunham Lodge; 2019–present	Incumbent
