= Theo Clarke =

British politician (born 1985)

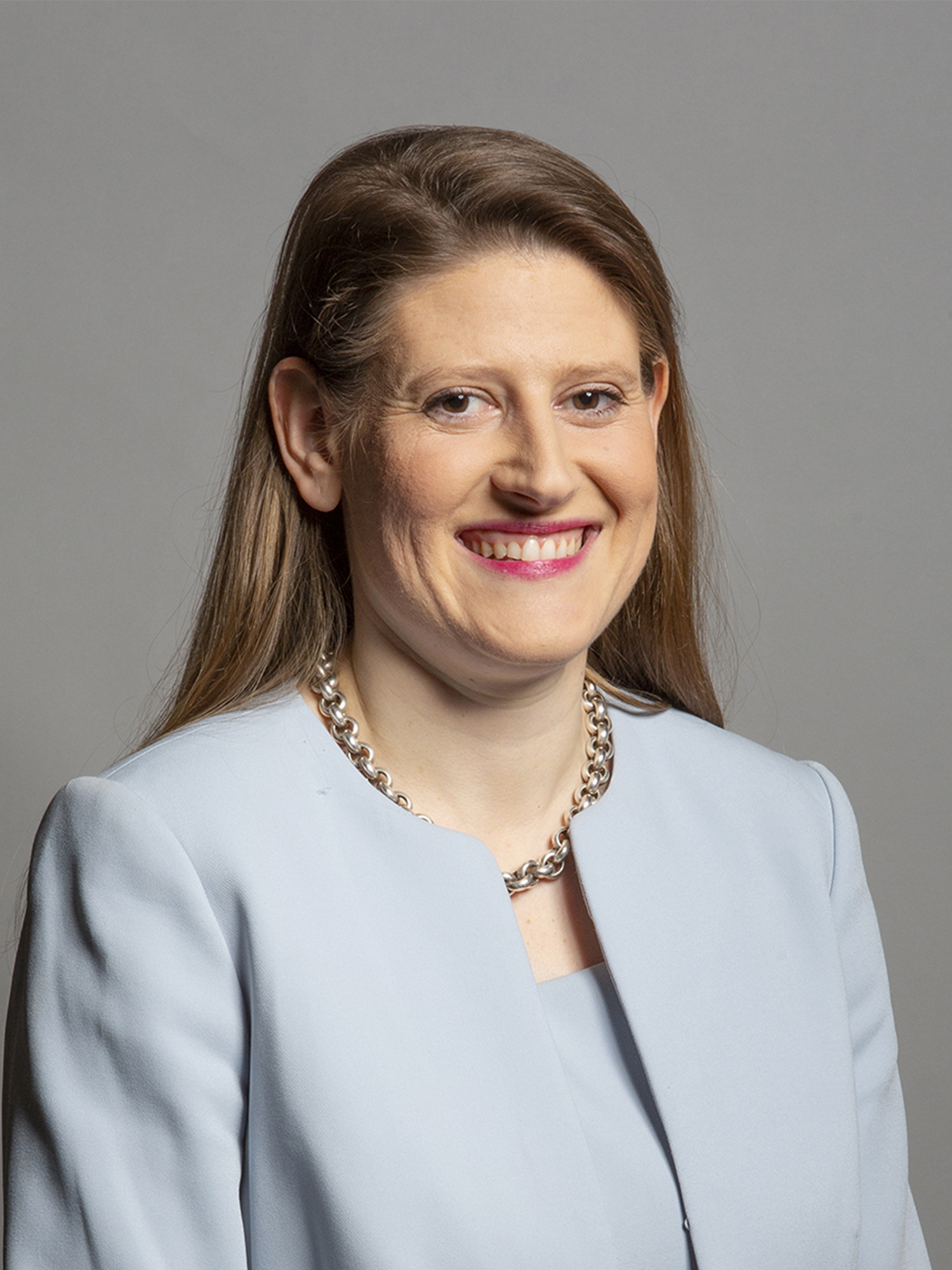
- Official portrait, 2019

Member of Parliament for Stafford
- In office 12 December 2019 – 30 May 2024
- Preceded by: Jeremy Lefroy
- Succeeded by: Leigh Ingham

Personal details
- Born: Theodora Roosevelt Clarke; 4 August 1985 (age 41)
- Party: Conservative
- Spouse: Henry Coram-James (m. 2021)
- Children: 1
- Parent: Sir Tobias Clarke, Bt. (father)
- Relatives: Sir Lawrence Clarke, Bt. (brother); Somerset de Chair (maternal grandfather); Jacob Rees-Mogg (uncle, by marriage)
- Education: Downe House School
- Alma mater: Newcastle University; Courtauld Institute of Art

Theodora Roosevelt Clarke (born 4 August 1985) is a British Conservative Party politician who was the Member of Parliament (MP) for Stafford from 2019 to 2024. Prior to her political career, she worked in the arts industry and founded the campaign group Coalition for Global Prosperity.

== Early life and career ==
Clarke grew up in the village of Bibury in Gloucestershire. She is the daughter of Sir Tobias Clarke, 6th Baronet and his second wife Teresa de Chair, a daughter of Somerset de Chair. Her younger brother is former athlete Sir Lawrence Clarke, 7th Baronet. Clarke also has a younger sister, Augusta. She is the niece of the wife of the former Business Secretary, Jacob Rees-Mogg. Clarke is a first cousin four times removed of US President Theodore Roosevelt and a more distant cousin of US President Franklin D. Roosevelt.

She attended Downe House School, a private school in Newbury, Berkshire. She studied art history at Newcastle University and the Courtauld Institute of Art, specialising in Russian Art. Clarke worked for the Museum of Modern Art in New York, and the British auction house Christie's before founding Russian Art and Culture, an online arts magazine in 2011. Channel 4's Dispatches reported in 2023 that Clarke had visited Moscow in September 2012 on a Russian government-funded trip as part of a delegation from the Conservative Friends of Russia. She was also a co-founder of the Association of Women in the Arts, and later founded the Coalition for Global Prosperity in 2017. As part of her work at the campaign group she volunteered in Sierra Leone in the aftermath of the Ebola outbreak.

== Parliamentary career ==
Clarke contested the Bristol East seat at the 2015 and 2017 general elections as the Conservative Party candidate but was unsuccessful. The party selected her as the candidate for Stafford on 26 September 2019. The incumbent Conservative MP Jeremy Lefroy had previously announced that he would be standing down at the next election. She was elected as Stafford's MP in the 2019 general election with a majority of 14,377 (28.1%), the largest in the constituency's history.

Clarke joined the International Development Committee in March 2020 and the Women and Equalities Committee in September 2020.

On 5 October 2020, Clarke was appointed as the Prime Ministerial Trade Envoy to Kenya. She helped implement the UK-Kenya Economic Partnership Agreement which continued the duty-free access to the UK market for Kenyan businesses after Brexit. The agreement carried forward arrangements agreed by the European Union and the East African Community. Clarke resigned this role in July 2022 in protest at Prime Minister Boris Johnson's leadership.

Clarke endorsed Penny Mordaunt during the July 2022 Conservative Party leadership election.

Clarke took maternity leave following the birth of her first child in August 2022.

In February 2023, Clarke stated she was unable to be re-selected as Conservative candidate for Stafford, further stating she intended to appeal to local members in an attempt to stay on as candidate.

In March 2023, Clarke was re-adopted as the Conservative candidate for Stafford having won the wider membership vote.

In the 2024 general election, she lost her seat to Leigh Ingham from Labour.

== Post-parliamentary career ==
Following her defeat at the 2024 general election, Clarke was appointed as Vice-Chairman of the Board at the United Nations Association UK. Clarke is also a Fellow at the RSA.

== Personal life ==
Clarke married Henry Coram-James, son of John Coram-James and The Countess of Harrowby (formerly Caroline Coram-James) and stepson of the Earl of Harrowby, on 14 August 2021 at the Church of St Mary, Bibury. In March 2022, she announced that the couple were expecting their first child. Their daughter Arabella was born in August 2022.

In a speech to the House of Commons in October 2023, Clarke revealed she had been rushed into emergency surgery following the birth of her daughter, calling on the government to do more to help women who had been through "birth trauma".

== Publications ==
- Breaking the Taboo: Why we need to talk about birth trauma (Biteback Publishing, 2025) ISBN 9781785909351

Parliament of the United Kingdom
Preceded by Jeremy Lefroy	Member of Parliament for Stafford; 2019–2024	Succeeded by Leigh Ingham
