= Stafford (constituency) =

UK Parliament constituency (since 1983)

Coordinates: 52.85°N 2.26°W

- County constituency for the House of Commons
- Boundaries since 2024
- Boundary of Stafford in West Midlands region
- County: Staffordshire
- Electorate: 69,832 (December 2010)
- Major settlements: Stafford, Eccleshall

Current constituency
- Created: 1983
- Member of Parliament: Leigh Ingham (Labour)
- Seats: One
- Created from: Stafford & Stone and Newcastle-under-Lyme

1918–1950
- Seats: One
- Type of constituency: County constituency
- Replaced by: Stafford & Stone

1295–1918
- Seats: 1290–1885: Two; 1885–1918: One
- Type of constituency: Borough constituency

Stafford is a constituency (Note: A county constituency (for the purposes of election expenses and type of returning officer)) represented in the House of Commons of the UK Parliament since 2024 by Leigh Ingham from the Labour Party. (Note: As with all constituencies, the constituency elects one Member of Parliament (MP) by the first past the post system of election at least every five years.)

Since its recreation in 1983, the seat has been a bellwether, always being held by the incumbent government.

== Constituency profile ==
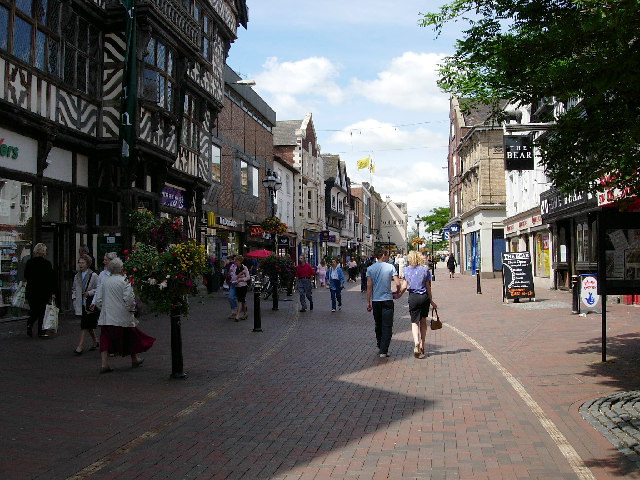
Greengate Street, Stafford

Stafford is a constituency in Staffordshire in the West Midlands region of England, covering parts of the Stafford and Newcastle-under-Lyme boroughs. Its main town is Stafford, which has a population of around 75,000. The constituency also covers a large rural area to the west of the town, including the small market town of Eccleshall and the villages of Gnosall and Loggerheads.

Stafford is a market town of Anglo-Saxon origins. It contains historic architectural sites such as the Ancient High House and Stafford Castle. Stafford was traditionally an important centre for shoemaking and is today a significant electrical engineering hub. There is some deprivation in Stafford town centre, whilst the eastern suburbs and rural villages are mostly affluent. House prices across the constituency are generally similar to the rest of the West Midlands but lower than the UK average.

Stafford has a low proportion of young adults and a large retired population. Residents have above-average levels of income and homeownership and the child poverty rate is low. They have average levels of education and a high proportion work in the health, transport and public sectors. The percentage claiming unemployment benefits is low. White people made up 92% of the population at the 2021 census.

At the local borough council level, most of Stafford is represented by Labour Party councillors whilst the town's western suburbs elected Green Party representatives and the rural villages elected Conservatives. At the county council, which held elections more recently (in 2025), most of the constituency's seats were won by Reform UK. An estimated 56% of voters across the Stafford constituency supported leaving the European Union in the 2016 referendum, higher than the UK-wide figure of 52%.

== Boundaries ==
1885–1918: The existing parliamentary borough, and so much of the municipal borough of Stafford as was not already included in the parliamentary borough.

1918–1950: The Municipal Borough of Stafford, the Rural District of Gnosall, the Rural District consisting of the civil parishes of Blymhill and Weston-under-Lizard, the Rural District of Stafford except the detached part of the civil parish of Colwich, and part of the Rural District of Cannock.

1983–1997: The Borough of Stafford wards of Baswich, Beaconside, Castletown, Church Eaton, Common, Coton, Doxey, Eccleshall, Forebridge, Gnosall, Highfields, Holmcroft, Littleworth, Manor, Milford, Parkside, Rowley, Seighford, Swynnerton, Tillington, Weeping Cross, and Woodseaves, and the Borough of Newcastle-under-Lyme wards of Loggerheads, Madeley, and Whitmore.

1997–2010: The Borough of Stafford wards of Baswich, Beaconside, Castletown, Common, Coton, Doxey, Forebridge, Haywood, Highfields, Holmcroft, Littleworth, Manor, Milford, Parkside, Rowley, Seighford, Tillington, and Weeping Cross, and the District of South Staffordshire wards of Acton Trussell, Bishopswood and Lapley, Penkridge North East, Penkridge South East, and Penkridge West.

2010–2024: The Borough of Stafford wards of Baswich, Castletown, Common, Coton, Doxey, Haywood and Hixon, Highfields and Western Downs, Holmcroft, Littleworth, Manor, Milford, Parkside, Rowley, Seighford, Tillington, and Weeping Cross, and the District of South Staffordshire wards of Penkridge North East and Acton Trussell, Penkridge South East, Penkridge West, and Wheaton Aston, Bishopswood and Lapley.

From 1997 to 2024, the constituency formed the southerly part of the Borough of Stafford, including the eponymous town itself plus the Penkridge area. in the District of South Staffordshire.

Map of 2010–2024 boundaries

2024–present: Further to the 2023 Periodic Review of Westminster constituencies which came into effect for the 2024 general election, the constituency is composed of the following (as they existed on 1 December 2020):

- The Borough of Newcastle-under-Lyme wards of: Loggerheads; Maer & Whitmore.
- The Borough of Stafford wards of: Baswich; Common; Coton; Doxey & Castletown; Eccleshall; Forebridge; Gnosall & Woodseaves; Highfields & Western Downs; Holmcroft; Littleworth; Manor; Penkside; Rowley; Seighford & Church Eaton; Weeping Cross & Wildwood.

The constituency was subject to significant changes due to the re-organisation of seats within Staffordshire. The parts in the South Staffordshire District, including Penkridge, together with areas to the east of Stafford, were included in the newly created constituency of Stone, Great Wyrley and Penkridge. To compensate, the boundaries were extended to the north and west, to include Eccleshall, Gnosall and the two Newcastle-under-Lyme wards, previously part of the abolished Stone constituency. The boundaries now resemble those in place from 1983 to 1997.

== History ==
Stafford, as a parliamentary borough, first existed between the Model Parliament in 1295 and 1950.

The current constituency was recreated for the 1983 general election.

Prominent members

The town was represented in Parliament by leading playwright Richard Brinsley Sheridan at the end of the 18th century.

Political history

Taken together with the Stafford and Stone seat which existed during the 33-year gap mentioned above, since 1910 when the last Liberal served the seat, the Conservative party has had five members and the Labour party three (this total includes the present member). In summary:

- Labour saw a bellwether result in their 1945 landslide victory, but Conservative Hugh Fraser regained the seat at the next election in 1950 in the successor seat which he held until his death in 1984.
- Effects from the creation of the Stone constituency in 1997 made Stafford somewhat more marginal: sitting Stafford MP Bill Cash followed some of his electors into the Stone constituency, which he won, and after a 47-year lack of a member, Labour's David Kidney gained the constituency in his party's landslide victory in 1997. The defeated Conservative candidate in 1997 was David Cameron, who in the next election was elected as the MP for the safe seat of Witney, and became the Conservative Party leader in 2005, and Prime Minister in 2010.

== Members of Parliament ==
=== Stafford parliamentary borough ===
==== MPs 1295–1640 ====
- Constituency created (1295)

Parliament	First member	Second member
1295	William Reynor	John Beyton
1337	Hugh Snel	
1353	Hugh Snel	
1360	Hugh Snel	
1362	Hugh Snel	
1363	Hugh Snel	
1365	Hugh Snel	
1366	Hugh Snel	
1368	Hugh Snel	
1369	Hugh Snel	
1371	Hugh Snel	
1373	Hugh Snel	
1376	Hugh Snel	
1377	Hugh Snel (murdered 1380)	
1386	Thomas Jockery	Richard Stanford
1388 (Feb)	John Newton	Nicholas Snell
1388 (Sep)	John Newton	Richard Stanford
1390 (Jan)	John Newton	John Snell
1390 (Nov)		
1391	John Newton	Richard Stanford
1393	Henry Warrilewe	John Baxter
1394		
1395	John Wylaston	John Baxter
1397 (Jan)	John Wylaston	John Clifton
1397 (Sep)		
1399	John Wylaston	Richard Stanford
1401		
1402	Richard Stanford	Thomas Barber
1404 (Jan)	Roger Coton	Adam Hewster
1404 (Oct)		
1406	Thomas Jockery	John Huntingdon
1407	Thomas Jockery	John Huntingdon
1410		
1411	Thomas Barber	Robert Whitgreve
1413 (Feb)
1413 (May)	Thomas Barber	Adam Edgeley
1414 (Apr)		
1414 (Nov)	Sampson Erdeswyk	Robert Whitgreve
1415		
1416 (Mar)	Henry Fenton	Robert Whitgreve
1416 (Oct)		
1417		
1419	John Harper	John Parker
1420	John Harper	Robert Whitgreve
1421 (May)	John Harper	Robert Whitgreve
1421 (Dec)	Adam Edgeley	Robert Whitgreve
1495	Humphrey Barber	
1510–1523	No names known	
1529	Thomas Stanford, died and replaced by 1553 by Sampson Erdeswick	John Bickley
1536	?	
1539	?	
1542	Walter Blount	William Stamford
1545	Henry Stafford	William Stamford
1547	Henry Stafford	Richard Forsett
1553 (Mar)	Edward Colbarne	Francis Smith
1553 (Oct)	Henry Stafford	?Sir Anthony Browne/Simon Lowe alias Fyfield
1554 (Apr)	John Giffard	Humphrey Swynnerton
1554 (Nov)	James Fowler	Matthew Cradock
1555	Henry Stafford	Thomas Harcourt
1558	Edward Stafford	James Fowler
1559 (Jan)	Edward Stafford	William Bowyer
1562–3	William Twyneho	Henry Goodere
1571	Walter Stafford	William Knollys
1572 (Apr)	Richard Broughton	Thomas Purslow
1584 (Nov)	John Stafford	Francis Cradock
1586	John Stafford	Francis Cradock
1588 (Oct)	Francis Cradock	Henry Bourchier
1593	Henry Bourchier	Francis Cradock
1597 (Oct)	Sir Edward Stafford	Henry Bourchier
1601 (Oct)	Sir Edward Stafford	William Essex
1604–1611	Hugh Beeston replaced 1609 by Arthur Ingram	George Cradock
1614	Sir Walter Devereux	Thomas Gibbs
1621	Matthew Cradock	Richard Dyott
1624	Matthew Cradock	Richard Dyott
1625	Matthew Cradock	Sir Robert Hatton Sat for Sandwich replaced by Sir John Offley
1626	Sir John Offley	Bulstrode Whitlock
1628	Matthew Cradock	William Wingfield
1629–1640	No Parliaments convened	

==== MPs 1640–1885 ====
Election	First member	First party	Second member	Second party
April 1640	Ralph Sneyd		Richard Weston	
November 1640	Ralph Sneyd	Royalist	Richard Weston	Royalist
October 1642	Ralph Sneyd	Royalist	Weston disabled from sitting – seat vacant	
May 1643	Sneyd disabled from sitting – seat vacant		Weston disabled from sitting – seat vacant	
1645	John Swinfen		Edward Leigh	
December 1648	Swinfen and Leigh excluded in Pride's Purge – both seats vacant			
1653	Stafford was unrepresented in the Barebones Parliament			
1654	John Bradshaw		Stafford had only one seat in the First and Second Parliaments of the Protectorate	
1656	Martin Noel		Stafford had only one seat in the First and Second Parliaments of the Protectorate	
January 1659	Martin Noel		William Jessop	
May 1659	Not represented in the restored Rump			
April 1660	John Swinfen		Sir Charles Wolseley	
1661	Robert Milward		William Chetwynd	
1674	Walter Chetwynd		William Chetwynd	
February 1679	Walter Chetwynd		Sir Thomas Armstrong	
August 1679	Sir Thomas Wilbraham		Sir Thomas Armstrong	
1681	Edwin Skrymsher		Sir Thomas Armstrong	
1685	Walter Chetwynd		Rowland Okeover	
1689	Philip Foley		John Chetwynd	
1690	Jonathan Cope		John Chetwynd	
1694	Thomas Foley		John Chetwynd	
1695	Thomas Foley		Philip Foley	
January 1701	Thomas Foley		John Chetwynd	
November 1701	Thomas Foley		John Pershall	
July 1702	Thomas Foley		John Chetwynd	
December 1702	Thomas Foley		Walter Chetwynd	
1711	Thomas Foley		Henry Vernon	
1712	1st Viscount Chetwynd		Henry Vernon	
1715	1st Viscount Chetwynd		William Chetwynd	
1722	Thomas Foley		John Dolphin	
1724 by-election	Thomas Foley		Francis Elde	
1725	Thomas Foley		1st Viscount Chetwynd	
1727	Joseph Gascoigne Nightingale		1st Viscount Chetwynd	
1734	Hon. William Chetwynd; 3rd Viscount Chetwynd from 1767		Thomas Foley	
1738 by-election	Hon. William Chetwynd; 3rd Viscount Chetwynd from 1767		2nd Viscount Chetwynd	
1747	Hon. William Chetwynd; 3rd Viscount Chetwynd from 1767		John Robins	
1754	Hon. William Chetwynd; 3rd Viscount Chetwynd from 1767		William Richard Chetwynd	
1765 by-election	Hon. William Chetwynd; 3rd Viscount Chetwynd from 1767		John Crewe	Whig
1768	Hon. William Chetwynd; 3rd Viscount Chetwynd from 1767		Richard Whitworth	
1770 by-election	William Neville Hart		Richard Whitworth	
1774	Hugo Meynell		Richard Whitworth	
1780	Edward Monckton	Tory	Richard Brinsley Sheridan	Whig
1806	Edward Monckton	Tory	Richard Mansel-Philipps	Tory
1812	Ralph Benson	Tory	Thomas Wilson	
1818	Benjamin Benyon	Whig	Samuel Homfray	
1820	Benjamin Benyon	Whig	Sir George Chetwynd	Whig
June 1826	Richard Ironmonger		Ralph Benson	Tory
December 1826 by-election	Thomas Beaumont	Whig	Ralph Benson	Tory
1830	John Campbell	Whig	Thomas Gisborne	Whig
1832	William Fawkener Chetwynd	Whig	Rees Howell Gronow	Whig
January 1835	William Fawkener Chetwynd	Whig	Sir Francis Holyoake Goodricke	Conservative
May 1835	William Fawkener Chetwynd	Whig	Writ suspended – seat left vacant	
1837 by-election	William Fawkener Chetwynd	Whig	Robert Farrand	Conservative
1841	Hon. Swynfen Carnegie	Conservative	Edward Manningham-Buller	Whig
1847	David Urquhart	Conservative	Thomas Sidney	Conservative
1852	John Ayshford Wise	Whig	Arthur Otway	Whig
1857	John Ayshford Wise	Whig	Viscount Ingestre	Conservative
1859	John Ayshford Wise	Liberal	Thomas Salt	Conservative
1860 by-election	Thomas Sidney	Liberal	Thomas Salt	Conservative
1865	Michael Bass	Liberal	Walter Meller	Conservative
1868	Henry Pochin	Liberal	Walter Meller	Conservative
1869 by-election	Thomas Salt	Conservative	Hon. Reginald Talbot	Conservative
1874	Thomas Salt	Conservative	Alexander Macdonald	Liberal-Labour
1880	Charles McLaren	Liberal	Alexander Macdonald	Liberal-Labour
1881 by-election	Charles McLaren	Liberal	Thomas Salt	Conservative
1885	Representation reduced to one member			

==== MPs 1885–1918 ====
Election	Member	Party
1885	Charles McLaren	Liberal
1886	Thomas Salt	Conservative
1892	Charles Shaw	Liberal
1910	Sir Walter Essex	Liberal
1918	Parliamentary borough abolished. Name transferred to a county division	

=== Stafford division of Staffordshire ===
==== MPs 1918–1950 ====
Year	Member	Party
1918	Hon. William Ormsby-Gore	Unionist
1938	Peter Thorneycroft	Conservative
1945	Stephen Swingler	Labour

=== Stafford county constituency ===
==== MPs since 1983 ====
Election	Member	Party
1983	Sir Hugh Fraser	Conservative
1984 by-election	Bill Cash	Conservative
1997	David Kidney	Labour
2010	Jeremy Lefroy	Conservative
2019	Theodora Clarke	Conservative
2024	Leigh Ingham	Labour

== Elections ==
=== Elections in the 2020s ===
General election 2024: Stafford
Party	Candidate	Votes	%	±%
Labour	Leigh Ingham	18,531	40.3	+9.1
Conservative	Theo Clarke	13,936	30.3	−27.6
Reform	Michael Riley	8,612	18.7	New
Green	Scott Spencer	2,856	6.2	+1.7
Liberal Democrats	Peter Andras	1,676	3.6	−2.8
Monster Raving Loony	Titus Anything	307	0.7	New
Heritage	Craig Morton	91	0.2	New
Majority		4,595	10.0	
Turnout		46,009	65.2	−7.5
Labour gain from Conservative		Swing	+19.0	

=== Elections in the 2010s ===
General election 2019: Stafford
Party	Candidate	Votes	%	±%
Conservative	Theo Clarke	29,992	58.6	+3.9
Labour	Joyce Still	15,615	30.5	−9.4
Liberal Democrats	Alex Wagner	3,175	6.2	+3.2
Green	Emma Carter	2,367	4.6	+2.2
Majority		14,377	28.1	+13.3
Turnout		51,149	70.5	−5.4
Conservative hold		Swing	+6.6	

General election 2017: Stafford
Party	Candidate	Votes	%	±%
Conservative	Jeremy Lefroy	28,424	54.7	+6.3
Labour	David Williams	20,695	39.9	+10.3
Liberal Democrats	Christine Tinker	1,540	3.0	+0.2
Green	Tony Pearce	1,265	2.4	−0.5
Majority		7,729	14.8	−4.0
Turnout		51,924	75.9	+4.9
Conservative hold		Swing	−2.0	

General election 2015: Stafford
Party	Candidate	Votes	%	±%
Conservative	Jeremy Lefroy	23,606	48.4	+4.5
Labour	Kate Godfrey	14,429	29.6	−3.4
UKIP	Edward Whitfield	6,293	12.9	+9.5
NHA	Karen Howell	1,701	3.5	New
Green	Mike Shone	1,390	2.9	+1.8
Liberal Democrats	Keith Miller	1,348	2.8	−13.5
Majority		9,177	18.8	+8.9
Turnout		48,767	71.0	−0.2
Conservative hold		Swing	+3.9	

General election 2010: Stafford
Party	Candidate	Votes	%	±%
Conservative	Jeremy Lefroy	22,047	43.9	+4.7
Labour	David Kidney	16,587	33.0	−10.2
Liberal Democrats	Barry Stamp	8,211	16.3	+2.0
UKIP	Roy Goode	1,727	3.4	+0.1
BNP	Roland Hynd	1,103	2.2	New
Green	Mike Shone	564	1.1	New
Majority		5,460	10.9	
Turnout		50,239	71.2	+4.2
Conservative gain from Labour		Swing	+7.4	

=== Elections in the 2000s ===
General election 2005: Stafford
Party	Candidate	Votes	%	±%
Labour	David Kidney	19,889	43.7	−4.3
Conservative	David Chambers	17,768	39.0	+2.4
Liberal Democrats	Barry Stamp	6,390	14.0	+4.5
UKIP	Frederick Goode	1,507	3.3	−1.9
Majority		2,121	4.7	−6.7
Turnout		45,554	64.7	−0.6
Labour hold		Swing	−3.3	

General election 2001: Stafford
Party	Candidate	Votes	%	±%
Labour	David Kidney	21,285	48.0	+0.5
Conservative	Philip A. Cochrane	16,253	36.6	−2.6
Liberal Democrats	Jeanne Pinkerton	4,205	9.5	−1.1
UKIP	Richard Bridgeman	2,315	5.2	New
Rock 'n' Roll Loony	Michael D. Hames	308	0.7	New
Majority		5,032	11.4	+3.1
Turnout		44,366	65.3	−12.3
Labour hold		Swing		

=== Elections in the 1990s ===
General election 1997: Stafford
Party	Candidate	Votes	%	±%
Labour	David Kidney	24,606	47.5	+12.6
Conservative	David Cameron	20,292	39.2	−8.9
Liberal Democrats	Pam A. Hornby	5,480	10.6	−5.9
Referendum	Stephen R. Culley	1,146	2.2	New
Monster Raving Loony	Ashton A.N. May	248	0.5	New
Majority		4,314	8.3	
Turnout		51,772	76.6	−6.3
Labour gain from Conservative		Swing	+10.7	

General election 1992: Stafford
Party	Candidate	Votes	%	±%
Conservative	Bill Cash	30,876	49.9	−1.4
Labour	David Kidney	19,976	32.3	+11.1
Liberal Democrats	Jamie G. Calder	10,702	17.3	−10.2
Independent	Christopher Peat	178	0.3	New
Natural Law	Philip Lines	176	0.3	New
Majority		10,900	17.6	−6.2
Turnout		61,908	82.9	+3.4
Conservative hold		Swing	−6.3	

=== Elections in the 1980s ===
General election 1987: Stafford
Party	Candidate	Votes	%	±%
Conservative	Bill Cash	29,541	51.3	+0.1
SDP	Colin Phipps	15,834	27.5	+2.7
Labour	Najma Hafeez	12,177	21.2	−2.5
Majority		13,707	23.8	−2.6
Turnout		57,552	79.5	+3.0
Conservative hold		Swing		

By-election 1984: Stafford
Party	Candidate	Votes	%	±%
Conservative	Bill Cash	18,713	40.4	−10.8
SDP	David Dunn	14,733	31.8	+7.0
Labour	Michael JD Poulter	12,677	27.4	+3.7
Independent	Christopher Teasdale	210	0.4	New
Majority		3,980	8.6	−17.8
Turnout		46,333	65.6	−10.9
Registered electors		70,635		
Conservative hold		Swing		

- Death of Sir Hugh Fraser 6 March 1984

General election 1983: Stafford
Party	Candidate	Votes	%	±%
Conservative	Hugh Fraser	27,639	51.2	
SDP	David Dunn	13,362	24.8	
Labour	Michael JD Poulter	12,789	23.7	
Gizza Job	J Caruso	212	0.4	
Majority		14,277	26.4	
Turnout		54,002	76.5	
Conservative win (new seat)				

=== Election in the 1940s ===
General election 1945: Stafford
Party	Candidate	Votes	%	±%
Labour	Stephen Swingler	17,923	52.1	+8.5
Conservative	Peter Thorneycroft	16,500	47.9	−8.5
Majority		1,423	4.2	
Turnout		33,793	78.0	−1.0
Labour gain from Conservative		Swing		

=== Elections in the 1930s ===
1938 Stafford by-election
Party	Candidate	Votes	%	±%
Conservative	Peter Thorneycroft	16,754	57.6	+1.2
Labour	Frank G Lloyd	12,346	42.4	−1.2
Majority		4,408	15.2	+2.4
Turnout		29,100	77.2	−1.8
Conservative hold		Swing	+1.2	

General election 1935: Stafford
Party	Candidate	Votes	%	±%
Conservative	William Ormsby-Gore	16,175	56.4	−11.7
Labour	Frank G Lloyd	12,514	43.6	+11.7
Majority		3,661	12.8	−23.4
Turnout		28,689	79.0	+0.5
Conservative hold		Swing		

General election 1931: Stafford
Party	Candidate	Votes	%	±%
Conservative	William Ormsby-Gore	18,467	68.1	+23.0
Labour	Len Smith	8,640	31.9	−4.7
Majority		9,827	36.2	+27.7
Turnout		27,107	78.5	−3.3
Conservative hold		Swing		

=== Elections in the 1920s ===
General election 1929: Stafford
Party	Candidate	Votes	%	±%
Unionist	William Ormsby-Gore	12,324	45.1	−17.0
Labour	Leonard Smith	10,011	36.6	−1.3
Liberal	Arthur Stanley Leyland	5,000	18.3	New
Majority		2,313	8.5	−15.7
Turnout		27,335	81.8	+2.7
Registered electors		33,420		
Unionist hold		Swing	−7.9	

General election 1924: Stafford
Party	Candidate	Votes	%	±%
Unionist	William Ormsby-Gore	12,404	62.1	+8.2
Labour	William Thomas Scott	7,571	37.9	−8.2
Majority		4,833	24.2	+16.4
Turnout		19,975	79.1	+6.2
Registered electors		25,260		
Unionist hold		Swing	+8.2	

General election 1923: Stafford
Party	Candidate	Votes	%	±%
Unionist	William Ormsby-Gore	9,823	53.9	−5.0
Labour	William Thomas Scott	8,412	46.1	+5.0
Majority		1,411	7.8	−10.0
Turnout		18,235	72.9	−3.8
Registered electors		25,024		
Unionist hold		Swing	−5.0	

General election 1922: Stafford
Party	Candidate	Votes	%	±%
Unionist	William Ormsby-Gore	10,990	58.9	−7.5
Labour	Bill Holmes	7,672	41.1	New
Majority		3,318	17.8	−15.0
Turnout		18,662	76.7	+22.7
Registered electors		24,317		
Unionist hold		Swing	−7.5	

=== Elections in the 1910s ===
General election 1918: Stafford
Party		Candidate	Votes	%	±%
C	Unionist	William Ormsby-Gore	8,304	66.4	+18.4
	Liberal	Walter Meakin	4,203	33.6	−18.4
Majority			4,101	32.8	
Turnout			12,507	54.0	−38.6
Registered electors			23,140		
	Unionist gain from Liberal		Swing	+18.4	
C indicates candidate endorsed by the coalition government.

General election December 1910: Stafford
Party	Candidate	Votes	%	±%
Liberal	Walter Essex	1,992	52.0	+0.9
Conservative	John Nicholson	1,837	48.0	−0.9
Majority		155	4.0	+1.8
Turnout		3,829	92.6	−4.1
Liberal hold		Swing	+0.9	

General election January 1910: Stafford
Party	Candidate	Votes	%	±%
Liberal	Charles Shaw	2,042	51.1	−3.2
Conservative	Reginald Higgs Jones Mortimer	1,957	48.9	+3.2
Majority		85	2.2	−6.4
Turnout		3,999	96.7	+4.5
Liberal hold		Swing	−3.2	

=== Elections in the 1900s ===
General election 1906: Stafford
Party	Candidate	Votes	%	±%
Liberal	Charles Shaw	1,947	54.3	+2.6
Conservative	Ronald Courthope Bosanquet	1,636	45.7	−2.6
Majority		311	8.6	+5.2
Turnout		3,583	92.2	+2.8
Registered electors		3,885		
Liberal hold		Swing	+2.6	

Charles Shaw

General election 1900: Stafford
Party	Candidate	Votes	%	±%
Liberal	Charles Shaw	1,633	51.7	+1.5
Conservative	George Cawston	1,528	48.3	−1.5
Majority		105	3.4	+3.0
Turnout		3,161	89.4	−3.5
Registered electors		3,534		
Liberal hold		Swing	+1.5	

=== Elections in the 1890s ===
General election 1895: Stafford
Party	Candidate	Votes	%	±%
Liberal	Charles Shaw	1,568	50.2	−5.8
Conservative	Thomas Salt	1,556	49.8	+5.8
Majority		12	0.4	−11.6
Turnout		3,124	92.9	+4.7
Registered electors		3,361		
Liberal hold		Swing	−5.8	

General election 1892: Stafford
Party	Candidate	Votes	%	±%
Liberal	Charles Shaw	1,684	56.0	+7.6
Conservative	Douglas Straight	1,322	44.0	−7.6
Majority		362	12.0	
Turnout		3,006	88.2	−2.6
Registered electors		3,409		
Liberal gain from Conservative		Swing	+7.6	

=== Elections in the 1880s ===
General election 1886: Stafford
Party	Candidate	Votes	%	±%
Conservative	Thomas Salt	1,528	51.6	+2.4
Liberal	Charles McLaren	1,435	48.4	−2.4
Majority		93	3.2	
Turnout		2,963	90.8	−1.6
Registered electors		3,264		
Conservative gain from Liberal		Swing	+2.4	

General election 1885: Stafford
Party	Candidate	Votes	%	±%
Liberal	Charles McLaren	1,532	50.8	−3.7
Conservative	Thomas Salt	1,485	49.2	+3.6
Majority		47	1.6	−0.6
Turnout		3,017	92.4	+21.8 (est)
Registered electors		3,264		
Liberal hold		Swing	−3.7	

By-election, 21 Nov 1881: Stafford (1 seat)
Party	Candidate	Votes	%	±%
Conservative	Thomas Salt	1,482	55.6	+10.0
Lib-Lab	George Howell	1,185	44.4	−10.1
Majority		297	11.2	
Turnout		2,667	79.8	+9.2 (est)
Registered electors		3,344		
Conservative gain from Lib-Lab		Swing	+10.1	

- Caused by Macdonald's death.

General election 1880: Stafford (2 seats)
Party	Candidate	Votes	%	±%
Liberal	Charles McLaren	1,498	28.7	+7.6
Lib-Lab	Alexander Macdonald	1,345	25.8	−1.9
Conservative	Thomas Salt	1,230	23.6	−5.4
Conservative	Gerald Francis Talbot	1,149	22.0	−0.2
Majority		115	2.2	−3.3
Turnout		2,611 (est)	70.6 (est)	+8.5
Registered electors		3,699		
Liberal gain from Conservative		Swing	+6.5	
Lib-Lab hold		Swing	−0.9	

=== Elections in the 1870s ===
General election 1874: Stafford (2 seats)
Party	Candidate	Votes	%	±%
Conservative	Thomas Salt	1,238	29.0	+12.5
Lib-Lab	Alexander Macdonald	1,183	27.7	−4.7
Conservative	Francis Bridgeman	947	22.2	+5.7
Liberal	Henry Pochin	903	21.1	−13.7
Turnout		2,136 (est)	62.1 (est)	−10.0
Registered electors		3,699		
Majority		55	1.3	+0.8
Conservative hold		Swing	+10.9	
Majority		236	5.5	+3.6
Lib-Lab hold		Swing	−6.9	

=== Elections in the 1860s ===
By-election, 7 June 1869: Stafford (2 seats)
Party	Candidate	Votes	%	±%
Conservative	Thomas Salt	1,206	28.5	+12.0
Conservative	Reginald Talbot	1,130	26.7	+10.2
Liberal	William Evans	954	22.5	−12.3
Liberal	Benjamin Whitworth	943	22.3	−10.1
Majority		176	4.2	+3.7
Turnout		2,117 (est)	67.1 (est)	−5.0
Registered electors		3,152		
Conservative hold		Swing	+11.6	
Conservative gain from Liberal		Swing	+10.7	

- The 1868 election was declared void on petition "on account of corrupt practices", causing a by-election.

General election 1868: Stafford (2 seats)
Party	Candidate	Votes	%	±%
Liberal	Henry Pochin	1,189	34.8	+9.3
Conservative	Walter Meller	1,124	32.9	+4.9
Liberal	Richard Croft Chawner	1,107	32.4	−14.1
Turnout		2,272 (est)	72.1 (est)	−4.1
Registered electors		3,152		
Majority		65	1.9	−16.6
Liberal hold		Swing	+3.2	
Majority		17	0.5	−2.0
Conservative hold		Swing	+3.7	

General election 1865: Stafford (2 seats)
Party	Candidate	Votes	%	±%
Liberal	Michael Bass	1,091	46.5	+2.7
Conservative	Walter Meller	658	28.0	−2.0
Liberal	Henry Pochin	598	25.5	−0.8
Turnout		1,174 (est)	76.2 (est)	−0.1
Registered electors		1,540		
Majority		433	18.5	+4.7
Liberal hold		Swing	+1.9	
Majority		60	2.5	−9.9
Conservative hold		Swing	−2.0	

By-election, 3 August 1860: Stafford (2 seats)
Party	Candidate	Votes	%	±%
Liberal	Thomas Sidney	716	68.7	−1.4
Conservative	Dudley Ryder	326	31.3	+1.3
Majority		390	37.4	+23.6
Turnout		1,042	75.0	−1.3
Registered electors		1,390		
Liberal hold		Swing	−1.4	

- Caused by Wise's resignation.

=== Elections in the 1850s ===
General election 1859: Stafford (2 seats)
Party	Candidate	Votes	%	±%
Liberal	John Ayshford Wise	911	43.8	−5.3
Conservative	Thomas Salt	624	30.0	−6.8
Liberal	Thomas Sidney	366	17.6	New
Liberal	Henry Robert Addison	181	8.7	New
Turnout		1,041 (est)	76.3 (est)	−4.5
Registered electors		1,364		
Majority		287	13.8	+1.5
Liberal hold		Swing	+0.8	
Majority		258	12.4	−10.3
Conservative hold		Swing	−0.8	

General election 1857: Stafford (2 seats)
Party	Candidate	Votes	%	±%
Whig	John Ayshford Wise	993	49.1	+4.6
Conservative	Charles Chetwynd-Talbot	745	36.8	+11.3
Whig	Frederick William Cadogan	286	14.1	−15.9
Turnout		1,012 (est)	80.8 (est)	+8.5
Registered electors		1,252		
Majority		248	12.3	+9.9
Whig hold		Swing	+5.1	
Majority		459	22.7	
Conservative gain from Whig		Swing	+11.3	

General election 1852: Stafford (2 seats)
Party	Candidate	Votes	%	±%
Whig	John Ayshford Wise	801	44.5	+44.1
Whig	Arthur Otway	501	27.8	+27.7
Conservative	John Bourne	458	25.4	−23.3
Whig	James Cook Evans	39	2.2	New
Conservative	Edmund Hopkinson	1	0.1	−33.2
Majority		43	2.4	
Turnout		901 (est)	72.3 (est)	+11.5
Registered electors		1,246		
Whig gain from		Swing	+36.2	
Whig gain from Conservative		Swing	+28.0	

=== Elections in the 1840s ===
General election 1847: Stafford (2 seats)
Party	Candidate	Votes	%	±%
Conservative	David Urquhart	754	48.7	New
Conservative	Thomas Sidney	516	33.3	New
Conservative	Swynfen Carnegie	271	17.5	−26.9
Whig	John Lea	6	0.4	−17.9
Whig	James Adam Gordon	1	0.1	−18.2
Majority		510	32.9	+27.0
Turnout		774 (est)	60.8 (est)	−8.8
Registered electors		1,272		
Conservative hold		Swing		
Conservative gain from Whig		Swing		

By-election, 13 March 1846: Stafford
Party	Candidate	Votes	%	±%
Conservative	Swynfen Carnegie	733	96.7	+33.2
Whig	William Willcocks Sleigh	25	3.3	−33.2
Majority		708	93.4	+87.5
Turnout		758	60.3	−9.3
Registered electors		1,257		
Conservative hold		Swing	+33.2	

- Caused by Carnegie's appointment as a Lord Commissioner of the Treasury

General election 1841: Stafford (2 seats)
Party	Candidate	Votes	%	±%
Conservative	Swynfen Carnegie	681	42.4	+15.6
Whig	Edward Buller-Yarde-Buller	587	36.5	−12.0
Conservative	William Holmes	339	21.1	−3.6
Turnout		804 (est)	69.6 (est)	−9.1
Registered electors		1,154		
Majority		94	5.9	+3.8
Conservative hold		Swing	+10.8	
Majority		248	15.4	+12.2
Whig hold		Swing	−12.0	

=== Elections in the 1830s ===
General election 1837: Stafford (2 seats)
Party	Candidate	Votes	%	±%
Whig	William Fawkener Chetwynd	565	30.0	+2.3
Conservative	Robert Farrand	504	26.8	+7.9
Conservative	Bingham Baring	464	24.7	−12.0
Whig	William Blount	348	18.5	+3.6
Turnout		980	78.7	−5.5
Registered electors		1,246		
Majority		61	3.2	−5.6
Whig hold		Swing	+2.2	
Majority		40	2.1	−19.7
Conservative hold		Swing	+2.5	

By-election, 21 February 1837: Stafford
Party	Candidate	Votes	%	±%
Conservative	Robert Farrand	Unopposed		
Conservative hold				

- Caused by Goodricke's resignation, in 1835, to contest a by-election at Staffordshire. A writ for a by-election was denied for nearly two years.

General election 1835: Stafford (2 seats)
Party	Candidate	Votes	%	±%
Conservative	Francis Holyoake Goodricke	605	36.7	+36.7
Whig	William Fawkener Chetwynd	456	27.7	−14.7
Conservative	Robert Farrand	312	18.9	+18.9
Whig	Rees Howell Gronow	246	14.9	−15.3
Radical	Charles Wolseley	29	1.8	New
Turnout		941	84.2	−5.0
Registered electors		1,117		
Majority		359	21.8	
Conservative gain from Whig		Swing	+25.9	
Majority		144	8.8	+5.9
Whig hold		Swing	−21.3	

General election 1832: Stafford (2 seats)
Party	Candidate	Votes	%	±%
Whig	William Fawkener Chetwynd	739	42.4	New
Whig	Rees Howell Gronow	526	30.2	New
Whig	William Blount	476	27.3	New
Tory	Robert Farrand	0	0.0	−27.8
Majority		50	2.9	−4.2
Turnout		1,049	89.2	+4.3
Registered electors		1,176		
Whig hold		Swing		
Whig hold		Swing		

- Farrand retired before the poll. The election was later declared void and no writ was issued before the 1835 general election.

General election 1831: Stafford (2 seats)
Party	Candidate	Votes	%	±%
Whig	John Campbell	556	37.2	−4.9
Whig	Thomas Gisborne	522	34.9	−3.7
Tory	Thomas Hawkes	416	27.8	+8.5
Majority		106	7.1	−12.2
Turnout		849	c. 84.9	−1.5
Registered electors		c. 1,000		
Whig hold		Swing	−4.6	
Whig hold		Swing	−4.0	

General election 1830: Stafford (2 seats)
Party	Candidate	Votes	%	±%
Whig	Thomas Gisborne	666	42.1	
Whig	John Campbell	610	38.6	
Tory	Thomas Hawkes	305	19.3	
Majority		305	19.3	
Turnout		864	c. 86.4	
Registered electors		c. 1,000		
Whig gain from Nonpartisan				
Whig gain from Nonpartisan				

== See also ==
- 1984 Stafford by-election
- Parliamentary constituencies in Staffordshire
- List of parliamentary constituencies in West Midlands (region)

== Sources ==
- Craig, F. W. S. (1983) [1969]. British parliamentary election results 1918–1949 (3rd ed.). Chichester: Parliamentary Research Services. ISBN 0-900178-06-X.
- Britain Votes/Europe Votes By-Election Supplement 1983–, compiled and edited by F.W.S. Craig (Parliamentary Research Services 1985)
- Robert Beatson, A Chronological Register of Both Houses of Parliament (London: Longman, Hurst, Res & Orme, 1807)
- D Brunton & D H Pennington, Members of the Long Parliament (London: George Allen & Unwin, 1954)
- Cobbett's Parliamentary history of England, from the Norman Conquest in 1066 to the year 1803 (London: Thomas Hansard, 1808)
- Henry Stooks Smith, The Parliaments of England from 1715 to 1847, Volume 2 (London: Simpkin, Marshall & Co, 1845) The Parliaments of England: From 1st George I., to the Present Time
- The History of Parliament: the House of Commons – Stafford, Borough, 1386 to 1832
