= Sir Charles Mansfield Clarke, 1st Baronet =

British surgeon

Sir Charles Mansfield Clarke Bt
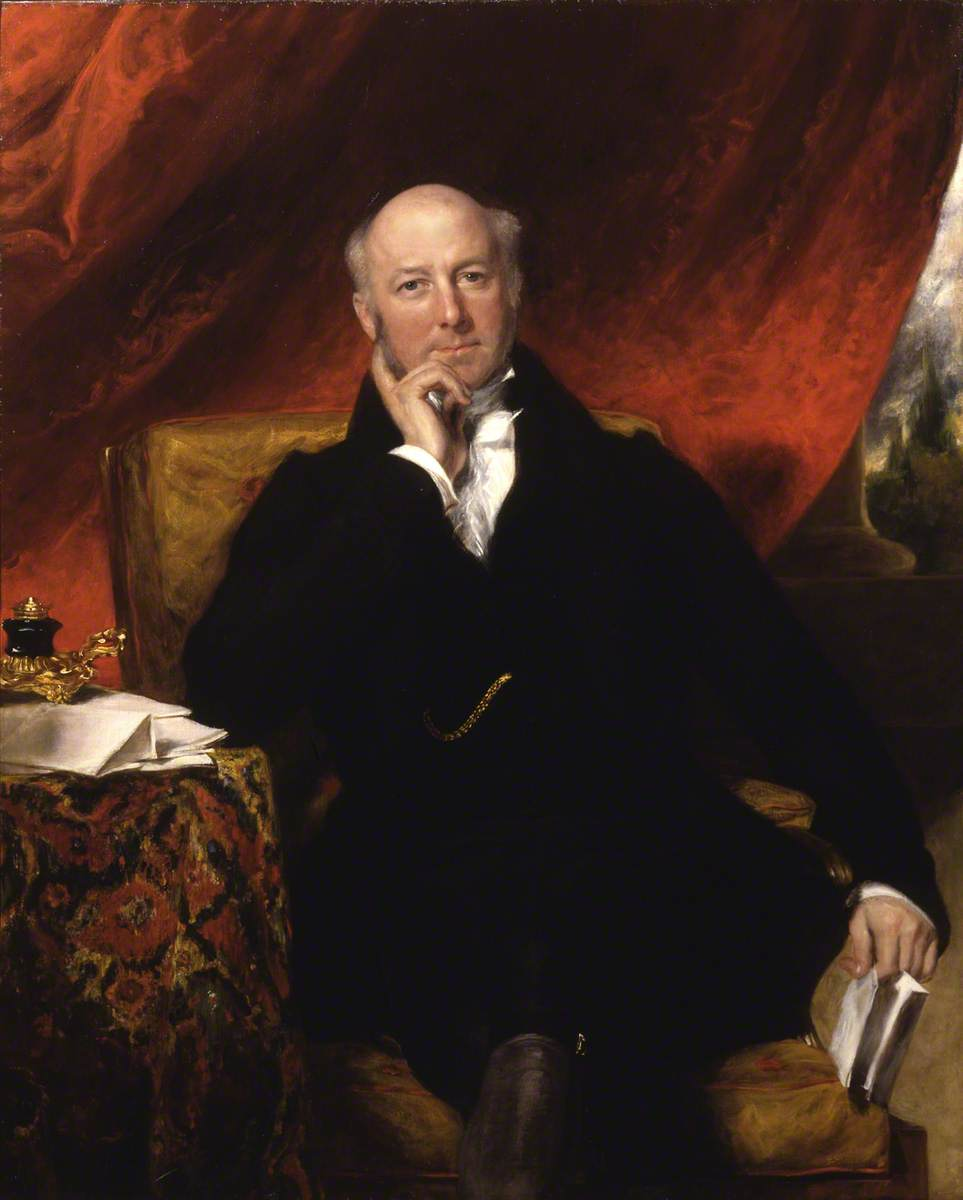
- Portrait by Samuel Lane, 1832
- Born: 28 May 1782; London
- Died: 7 September 1857 (aged 75); Marine Parade, Brighton
- Education: St Paul’s School (London); Hunterian School of Medicine
- Known for: Surgeon
- Title: Baronet

Sir Charles Mansfield Clarke, 1st Baronet, FRS, FRCP (28 May 1782 – 7 September 1857) was a British surgeon. A notable surgeon and physician, widely respected in London and Norfolk, he was the son of a surgeon, John Clarke of Chancery Lane, London, and brother of a well-known obstetrician, John Clarke (1758–1815).

== Family ==
He was the son of John Clarke and Biddy Mansfield. He married Mary Anna Squire, daughter of Wright Thomas Squire, on 17 January 1806. He was grandfather to General Sir Charles Mansfield Clarke, 3rd Baronet GCB GCVO.

== Medical career ==
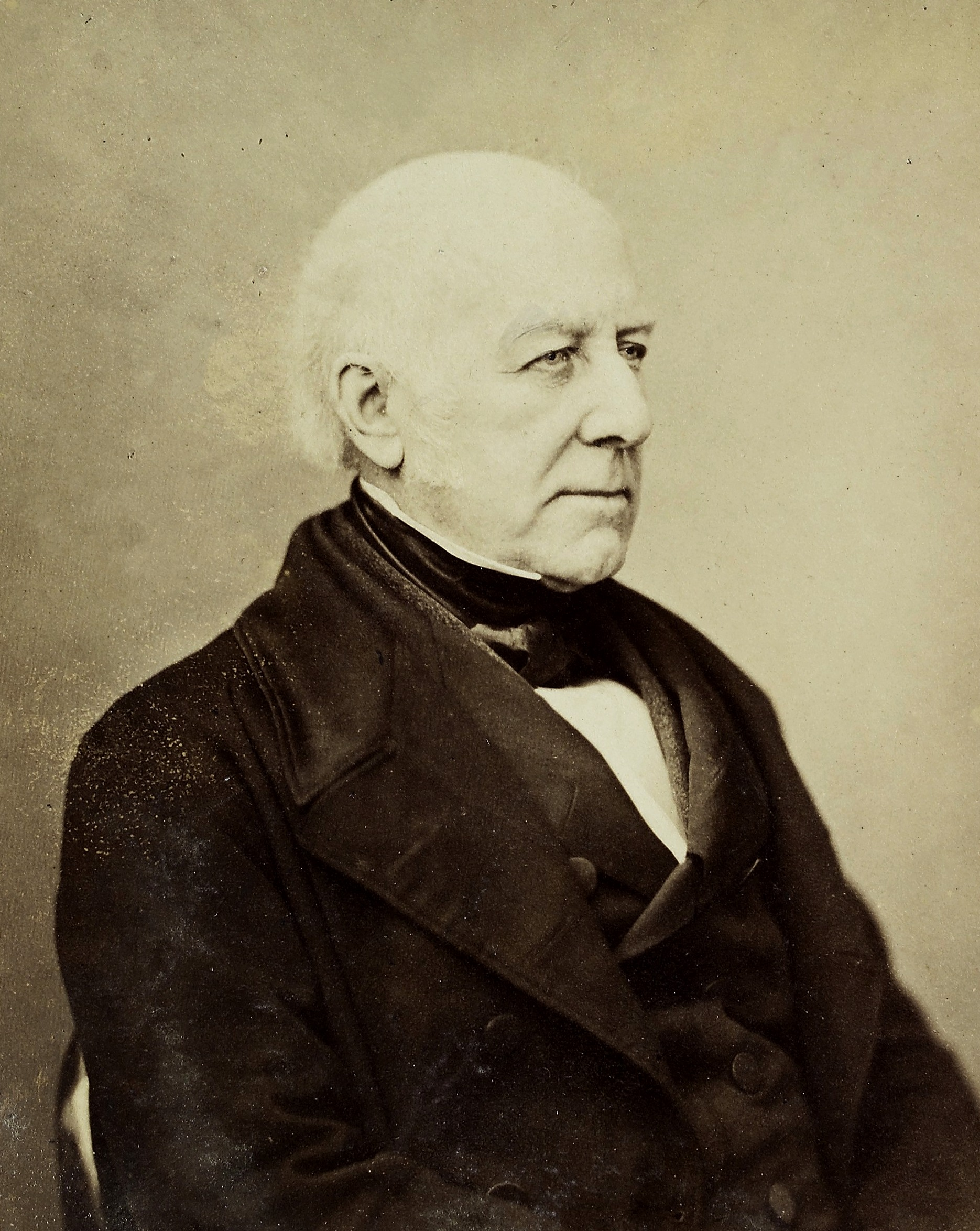
Photographic portrait by Hennah & Kent, undated

Educated at St. Paul’s School, London. He received his medical training at St George’s Hospital and the Hunterian School of Medicine. He graduated with a Doctor of Medicine (M.D.) from Lambeth in 1827. Having qualified, he spent two years as assistant surgeon in the Hertfordshire Militia. After a further period as surgeon with the 3rd Foot Guards, he left the army and, on his brother’s persuasion, specialised in midwifery and in women’s and children’s diseases.

He was awarded the honorary degree of Doctor of Law (LL.D) from Oxford in 1845, as well as an Honorary MA from Cambridge in 1842. He was invested as a Fellow, Royal Society (FRS) in 1825. In 1836 he was invested as a Fellow, Royal College of Physicians (FRCP).

Sir Charles was Royal Physician to Queen Adelaide, wife of William IV. As a result, he was created a baronet, of Dunham Lodge, in the County of Norfolk in the United Kingdom on 30 September 1831.

In 1814 and 1821 he published, in two parts, his only work of note, "Observations on those Diseases of Women which are attended by Discharges." Between the years 1804 and 1821, he delivered regular courses of lectures on these subjects. He was surgeon to Queen Charlotte’s Lying-In Hospital until about 1821. He co-founded the Westminster Medical Society.

== See also ==
- John Clarke (physician, 1761–1815), his brother

Baronetage of the United Kingdom
New creation	Baronet (of Dunham Lodge, Norfolk); 1831–1857	Succeeded by Charles Clarke
