= Sir Charles Clarke, 2nd Baronet =

Reverend Sir Charles Clarke, 2nd Baronet (15 June 1812 – 25 April 1899) was the eldest son of Sir Charles Mansfield Clarke, 1st Baronet of Dunham Lodge, Norfolk.

Educated at Charterhouse School, Surrey and Trinity College, Cambridge. He took his BA degree in 1831, and his MA in 1835. Having entered Holy Orders Sir Charles Clarke was appointed Rector of Hanwell in Middlesex in 1847 until 1864. He succeeded to the Baronetcy of Dunham Lodge, Norfolk on 7 September 1857.

In 1838 he married Rosa Mary Alexander, eldest daughter of Mr Henry Alexander, of Cork Street, and they had three sons and five daughters. Their eldest son was General Sir Charles Mansfield Clarke, 3rd Baronet GCB GCVO. Their second son, Frederick Clarke, was father of the 4th Baronet: Sir Orme Bigland Clarke, 4th Bt.

He was a Justice of the Peace for Essex.

Baronetage of the United Kingdom
Preceded by Charles Mansfield Clarke	Baronet (of Dunham Lodge, Norfolk); 1857 – 1899	Succeeded by Charles Clarke
