= Toby Clarke =

British baronet and businessman (1939–2019)

Sir Charles Mansfield Tobias Clarke, 6th Baronet (8 September 1939 – 16 September 2019), known as Sir Toby Clarke since 1973, was a British businessman.

Clarke was the son of Sir Humphrey Clarke, 5th Baronet and was educated at Eton, Christ Church, Oxford, the Sorbonne, and New York University. He founded The Baronets' Journal in 1987 and from 1993 to 1996 he was chairman of the Standing Council of the Baronetage Bankers Trust Co. He was associate director of Swiss Bank Corp. in 1992–94, underwriting member, Lloyds from 1984 to 2001, and lord of the Manor of Bibury.

Through his grandmother, Elfrida Roosevelt (Lady Clarke, wife of Sir Orme Bigland Clarke, Bt, CBE), he was related to U.S. President Theodore Roosevelt. President Roosevelt was his first cousin, three times removed. He was also the second cousin, three times removed to President Franklin D. Roosevelt.

He was married to Charlotte Walter and then Teresa Loraine Aphrodite de Chair (daughter of Somerset de Chair) (divorced). He has three children (by his second marriage): Theodora Roosevelt Clarke, Augusta Elfrida Clarke, and Olympic athlete Lawrence Somerset Clarke.

He was a Vice-President of the Standing Council of the Baronetage.

Clarke died on 16 September 2019, eight days after celebrating his 80th birthday.

Baronetage of the United Kingdom
Preceded by Humphrey Orme Clarke	Baronet (of Dunham Lodge, Norfolk); 1973 – 2019	Succeeded by Lawrence Somerset Clarke

== See also ==
- Clarke of Dunham Lodge, Norfolk

== Sources ==
- thePeerage.com
- Leigh Rayment's list of baronets
- Who's Who 2008
