= Sir Charles Clarke, 3rd Baronet =

British Army general (1839–1932)

General Sir Charles Clarke GCB Bt GCVO
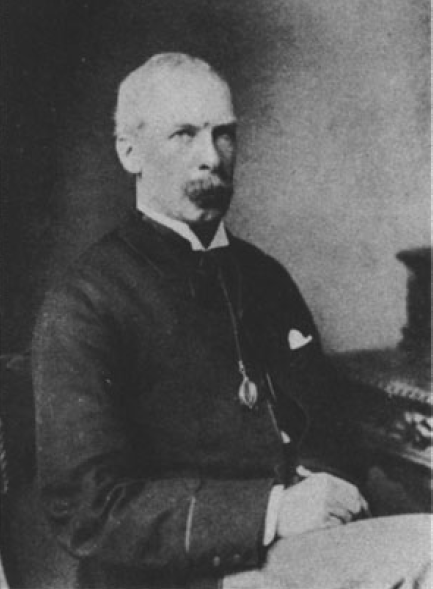

Governor of Malta
- In office 1903–1907
- Monarch: Edward VII
- Preceded by: Lord Grenfell
- Succeeded by: Sir Henry Grant

Personal details
- Born: 13 December 1839
- Died: 22 April 1932 (aged 92)
- Relations: Sir Charles Mansfield Clarke, 1st Baronet

Military service
- Allegiance: United Kingdom
- Branch/service: British Army
- Years of service: 1856–1907
- Rank: General
- Commands: Governor and Commander-in-Chief of Malta; Quartermaster-General to the Forces; Madras Army
- Battles/wars: Basuto Gun War; Second Boer War
- Awards: Knight Grand Cross of the Order of the Bath; Knight Grand Cross of the Royal Victorian Order

General Sir Charles Mansfield Clarke, 3rd Baronet, GCB, GCVO (13 December 1839 – 22 April 1932) was a British Army officer who served as governor of Malta from 1903 to 1907.

== Military career ==
Educated at Eton College, Clarke was commissioned into the 57th Regiment of Foot in 1856.

He rose to become Commandant-General of the Colonial Forces of the Cape of Good Hope between 1880 and 1882. He held a series of administrative roles before becoming Commander-in-Chief of the Madras Army in 1893 (renamed "the Madras Command of the Indian Army" in 1895).

He was appointed to the command of the Sixth Army Corps in the Second Boer War in South Africa in December 1899. He served as Quartermaster-General to the Forces from 1899 until 1903, during which he was promoted to general on 5 August 1902. The following year he became Governor and Commander-in-Chief of Malta, serving until he retired in 1907.

He succeeded to the title of 3rd Baronet Clarke of Dunham Lodge on 25 April 1899.

== Family ==
In 1867 he married Gemma Cecilia Adams (who died in 1922) and they had three sons and three daughters. All his sons predeceased him and he was succeeded in the baronetcy by his nephew, Orme Bigland Clarke. In 1929 he married Constance Marion Warner.

== Decorations ==
Most Honourable Order of the Bath

- Companion, CB, 1879 after the Zulu War
- Knight Commander, KCB, 1896 Birthday Honours
- Knight Grand Cross, GCB, 29 November 1900, in recognition of services in connection with the Campaign in South Africa 1899–1900

Royal Victorian Order

- Knight Grand Cross, GCVO, 1903

Military offices
Preceded by Sir James Dormer	C-in-C, Madras Army; 1893–1895	Post disbanded
New post	C-in-C, Madras Command; 1895–1898	Succeeded by Sir George Wolseley
Preceded by Sir George White	Quartermaster-General to the Forces; 1899–1903	Succeeded by Sir Ian Hamilton
Government offices
Preceded by The Lord Grenfell	Governor of Malta; 1903–1907	Succeeded by Sir Henry Grant
Baronetage of the United Kingdom
Preceded by Charles Clarke	Baronet (of Dunham Lodge, Norfolk); 1899–1932	Succeeded by Orme Bigland Clarke
