= Clarke baronets =

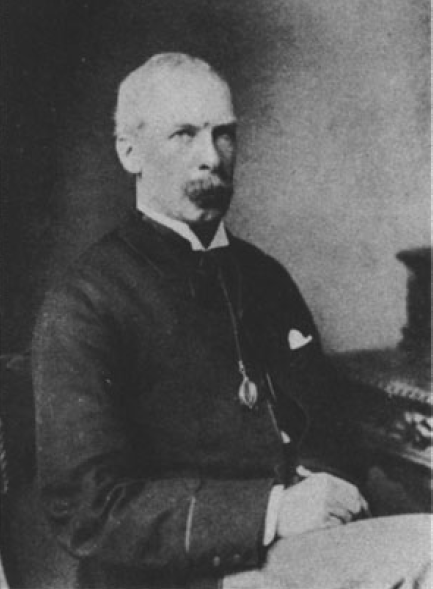

There have been five baronetcies created for persons with the surname Clarke, two in the Baronetage of England and three in the Baronetage of the United Kingdom. Two of the creations are extant as of 2010.

- Clarke baronets of Salford Shirland (1617)
- Clarke baronets of Snailwell (1698)
- Clarke, later Clarke-Travers baronets, of Crosses Green (1804): see Clarke-Travers baronets
- Clarke baronets of Dunham Lodge (1831)
- Clarke baronets of Rupertswood (1882)

== See also ==
- Clark baronets
- Clerk baronets
- Clerke baronets
- Clerk family
- Clarke-Jervoise baronets
