= Vice Great Seneschal of Ireland =

Deputy to a Great Officer of State

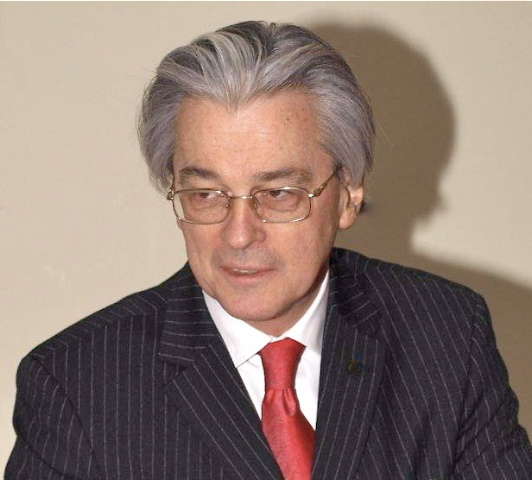
- Incumbent; Francis Martin O'Donnell since January 2005
- Type: Deputy to a Great Officer of State
- Appointer: Lord High Steward of Ireland
- First holder: Patrick Denis O'Donnell
- Succession: Hereditary

Vice Great Seneschal of Ireland is a ceremonial and functional role that operates under the authority of the Lord High Steward of Ireland - a historic office with roots in royal authority extending back several centuries. Traditionally held by the Hereditary Seneschal or Lord Steward of Tyrconnell, the Vice Great Seneschal serves as a deputy to the Lord High Steward. While not a formally titled office, the role includes representing the Lord High Steward when required, particularly at State occasions such as coronations, where duties may include bearing the Curtana (a Sword of state) and/or a White Wand.

== Brief history ==
The earliest recorded instance of the Lord High Steward appointing a deputy occurred with John Penyngton’s appointment as Steward of the Liberty of Wexford. The House of Lords upheld the right of the Earls of Shrewsbury to appoint deputies as stewards of counties in Ireland, affirming their prerogatives as holders of the office.

The Vice Great Seneschal served as President of the Court during trials of Irish peers in the Irish House of Lords and represented the Lord High Steward on state occasions. This role was formalised by Queen Victoria’s grant on 15 September 1871. Notable appointees who presided over peer trials included Thomas Wyndham, 1st Baron Wyndham in 1739, Robert Jocelyn, 1st Viscount Jocelyn in 1742, and John FitzGibbon, 1st Earl of Clare in 1798, with their ceremonial duties limited to these judicial functions.

Despite Ireland’s division into the sovereign Republic of Ireland and Northern Ireland, the role of Vice Great Seneschal persists in the United Kingdom. The position was granted to Patrick Denis O'Donnell, then Seneschal for Tyrconnell, by Charles Chetwynd-Talbot, 22nd Earl of Shrewsbury. The role is currently held by Francis Martin O'Donnell, an Irish diplomat, who inherited it from his father in 2005.

== Deputy Lord High Steward of Ireland ==
Deputy Lord High Steward of Ireland is an honorary title occasionally bestowed by the Lord High Steward. The position is purely ceremonial and carries no legal standing or authority, either in the United Kingdom or the Republic of Ireland. It is not recognised by the College of Arms in London, nor by official institutions within Ireland.

Appointments to the role are typically made in an honorary capacity and are akin to titular distinctions that do not confer land, rights, or privileges. While the title holds little formal significance, it is sometimes viewed as a gesture of goodwill. In some instances, appointees have used the position to support charitable initiatives or other public-minded activities. It has been reported that the Earl of Shrewsbury does not permit the title to be used for commercial purposes.

One of the known appointees, Joerg Barisch, claims to hold the title; however, given the unofficial nature of the appointment, it is not registered in the Irish Registry of Deeds, nor is it publicly recorded in the London Gazette. As such, the issuance of letters patent in these cases stands as the primary form of documentation.

In 1999, a reported instance involved an appointee auctioning the title for reassignment through the estate agency Strutt & Parker, achieving a sale price in excess of £55,000.
