= List of people with surname O'Donnell =

A number of notable people have the surname O'Donnell (or its variants O'Donnel and O'Donel):

== Academia ==
- Edward J. O'Donnell (1909–1986), President of Marquette University (1948–1962)
- Guillermo O'Donnell (1936–2011), Argentine academic
- Hugo O'Donnell, Duke of Tetuan (born 1948), Spanish naval historian, and Knight of Malta
- James J. O'Donnell (born 1950), American classical scholar and Provost of Georgetown University
- Patrick Denis O'Donnell (1922–2005), Irish military historian

== Entertainment and the arts ==
- Cathy O'Donnell (1923–1970), American actress, originally Ann Steely
- Chris O'Donnell (born 1970), American actor
- Daniel O'Donnell (singer) (born 1961), Irish musician
- Heather O'Donnell, American concert pianist
- James O'Donnell (organist) (born 1961), organist, choral conductor and academic teacher, Westminster Abbey
- Jamie-Lee O'Donnell, Irish actress
- Keir O'Donnell (born 1978), Australian actor living in Los Angeles
- Lawrence O'Donnell (born 1951), American television host of The Last Word with Lawrence O'Donnell, political analyst and writer
- Martin O'Donnell (born 1955), Audio Director for Bungie
- Michael O'Donnell (1928–2019), British physician and broadcaster
- Roger O'Donnell (born 1955), English musician and keyboardist of The Cure
- Rosie O'Donnell (born 1962), American actress and television hostess
- Steve O'Donnell (born 1954), American television scriptwriter
- Steven O'Donnell (Australian actor) (born 1980), Australian television presenter and actor

=== Characters ===
- Wolf O'Donnell, a character in Nintendo's Star Fox video game series
- O'Donnell, a Marvel Comics character and ally of Wolverine

== Journalism ==
- Kelly O'Donnell (born 1965), American journalist
- Norah O'Donnell (born 1974), American journalist

== Literature ==
- Elliott O'Donnell (1872–1965), Irish author
- Jessie Fremont O'Donnell (1860–1897), American writer
- John Francis O'Donnell (1837–1874), Irish journalist and poet
- Lisa O'Donnell, Scottish writer
- Mietta O'Donnell (1950–2001), Australian restaurateur and food writer
- Peadar O'Donnell (1893–1986), Irish political activist and writer
- Peter O'Donnell (1920–2010), British fiction writer
- Terence O'Donnell (1924–2011), American writer

== Medicine ==
- Barry O'Donnell (1926–2019), Irish surgeon
- Pacho O'Donnell (born 1941), Argentine psychoanalyst

== Nobility ==
- Calvagh O'Donnell (died 1566), The O'Donnell, 22nd Chieftain, and Lord of Tyrconnell
- Carlos O'Donnell, 2nd Duke of Tetuán (1834–1903), Spanish noble and politician
- Cathbarr O'Donnell (died 1608), a member of the O'Donnell dynasty
- Donnell O'Donnell (died 1590)
- Enrique O'Donnell, Conde del Abisbal (1769–1834), Irish-Spanish nobleman, Spanish general
- Hugh O'Donnell, 2nd Earl of Tyrconnell (1606–1642)
- José O'Donnell (1722–1787), Irish-Spanish nobleman, Spanish general
- Manus O'Donnell (died 1564), The O'Donnell, 21st Chieftain, King of Tyrconnell, and biographer of St Colmcille
- Maximilian Karl Lamoral O'Donnell (1812–1895), Hiberno-Austrian Count, saved life of Emperor Franz Josef I
- Niall Garve O'Donnell (1569–1626)
- Red Hugh O'Donnell (1572–1601), The O'Donnell, 24th Chieftain, Prince of Tyrconnell
- Rory O'Donnell, 1st Earl of Tyrconnell (1575–1608)

== Politics ==
- Christine O'Donnell (born 1969), American politician and social and political commentator
- Daniel O'Donnell (politician) (born 1960), American legislator from the state of New York
- Francis Martin O'Donnell (born 1954), Irish UN diplomat and Knight of Malta
- Frank A. O'Donnel (1852–1906), American politician
- Frank Hugh O'Donnell (1846–1916), nationalist MP
- Gus O'Donnell (born 1952), Baron, Cabinet Secretary (chief civil servant), British Government
- Hugh Roe O'Donnell (1572–1602), Irish Rebel
- James O'Donnell (politician) (1840–1915), American politician from Michigan
- John O'Donnell (Irish politician, born 1980s), nationally known figure
- Kenneth O'Donnell (1924–1977), American politician
- Leopoldo O'Donnell (1809–1867), 1st Duke of Tetuan, and former Prime Minister of Spain
- Peter O'Donnell (1924–2021), Texas Republican politician and businessman
- Phil O'Donnell (1932–1982), IRA volunteer from Derry
- Thomas O'Donnell (Irish nationalist politician) (1871–1943), Irish Nationalist MP for West Kerry
- Thomas E. O'Donnell (draft opponent), activist in the New York Draft Riots
- Tom O'Donnell (politician) (1926–2020), Irish politician

== Religion ==
- Cletus F. O'Donnell (1917–1992), American Roman Catholic bishop
- Edmund O'Donnell, Irish Jesuit
- Edward Joseph O'Donnell (1931–2009), American Roman Catholic bishop
- James O'Donnell (organist) (born 1961), current organist of Westminster Abbey
- James Louis O'Donel (1737–1811), first Roman Catholic bishop of St. John's, Newfoundland
- Patrick O'Donnell (1856–1927), Cardinal Archbishop of Armagh

== Sport ==
- Andy O'Donnell (1925–2019), American basketball player
- Carter O'Donnell (born 1998), American football player
- Conor O'Donnell, at least three Gaelic footballers
- Danny O'Donnell (born 1986), English footballer
- Ethan O'Donnell (born 1996/7), Irish Gaelic footballer
- Frank O'Donnell, Scottish professional footballer
- Gary O'Donnell (born 1965), Australian rules footballer
- Luke O'Donnell (born 1980), Australian International Rugby League player
- Mandy O'Donnell (born 1989), Scottish lawn and indoor bowler
- Martin O'Donnell (born 1986), English professional snooker player
- Neil O'Donnell (born 1966), former Pittsburgh Steelers quarterback
- Niall O'Donnell (born 1998), Irish Gaelic footballer
- Patrick O'Donnell (1965–2024), Northern Irish Gaelic football manager and player
- Phil O'Donnell (1972–2007), Scottish footballer
- Scott O'Donell (born 1967), Australian football (soccer) player
- Sean O'Donnell (born 1971), Canadian hockey player

== Other professions ==
- Denis O'Donnell (1875–1933), Irish dairy innovator and entrepreneur
- Emmett O'Donnell, Jr. (1906–1971), U.S. Air Force general
- I. D. O'Donnell, American agriculturalist and businessman
- Myles O'Donnell, Chicago mobster during the Prohibition era
