= O'Donnell (disambiguation) =

O'Donnell is a surname, and an ancient and powerful Irish family.

O'Donnell may also refer to:

== People ==
- List of people with surname O'Donnell
- O'Donnell baronets (1780–1889), a title in the Baronetage of Ireland
- O'Donnell Fortune (born 2001), American football player

== Places ==
- O'Donnell Peak, Antarctica
- O'Donnells, Newfoundland and Labrador, Canada
- O'Donnell, Ontario, Canada, a ghost town
- O'Donnell Park, Ireland
- Camp O'Donnell, Philippines
- O'Donnell, Capas, Tarlac, Philippines
- O'Donnell, Texas, United States
  - O'Donnell High School
- O'Donnell Heights, Baltimore, Maryland, United States
  - O'Donnell Street

== Buildings ==
- Campo de O'Donnell, a multi-use stadium in Madrid, Spain
- O'Donnell Building, a historic commercial building in Evansville, Indiana, United States
- O'Donnell Hall, the Saint Louis University Museum of Art, Missouri, United States
- O'Donnell House (disambiguation)
- O' Donnell Park, a stadium in County Donegal, Ireland

== Other uses ==
- O'Donnell's salamander (Bolitoglossa odonnelli), a salamander species
- O'Donnell (Madrid Metro), a station of the Madrid Metro

== See also ==
- O'Donnell Middle School (disambiguation)
- O'Donnell v Shanahan (2009), a UK company law case
