= Peter O'Donnell (disambiguation) =

Peter O'Donnell (1920–2010) was a British writer.

Peter O'Donnell may also refer to:

- Peter O'Donnell (sailor) (1939–2008), Australian sailor
- Peter O'Donnell (businessman) (1924–2021), American businessman, philanthropist and politician

== See also ==
- Peadar O'Donnell (1893–1986), Irish writer and political activist
- List of people named O'Donnell
