= Lord High Steward of Ireland =

Great Officer of State in the United Kingdom

- Arms of the Kingdom of Ireland

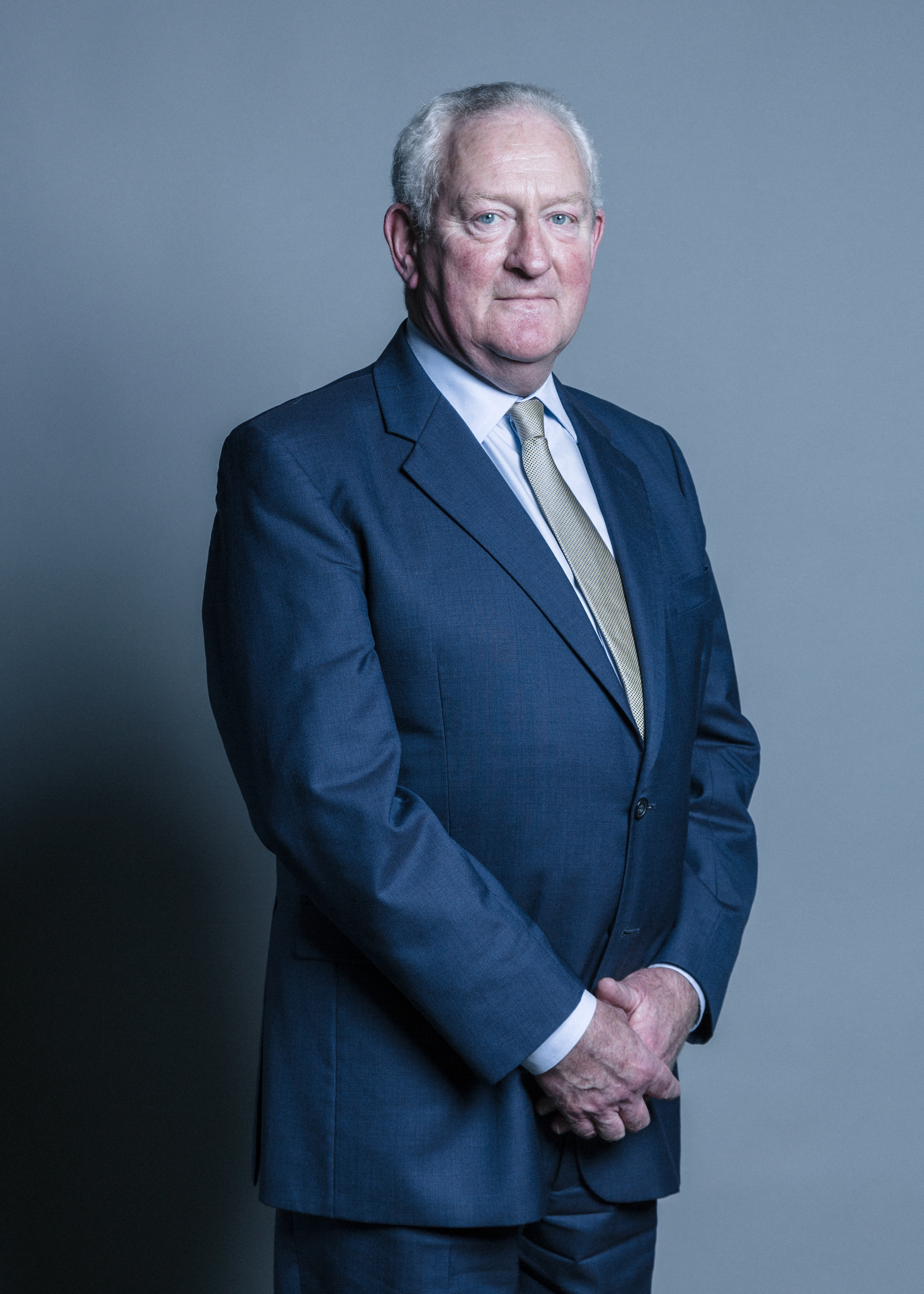
- Incumbent; Charles Chetwynd-Talbot, 22nd Earl of Shrewsbury since 12 November 1980
- Style: The Right Honourable
- Type: Great Officer of State
- Formation: 1446
- First holder: John Talbot, 1st Earl of Shrewsbury
- Succession: Hereditary
- Deputy: Vice Great Seneschal / Deputy Lord High Steward

The office of Lord High Steward of Ireland is a hereditary position of Great Officer of State in the United Kingdom. Currently held by the Earl of Shrewsbury, it is sometimes referred to as the Hereditary Great Seneschal. While most of Ireland achieved independence in 1922, the title retains its original naming and scope rather than adjusting to reflect Northern Ireland as the sole portion of the province of Ulster remaining within the United Kingdom.

The title of Lord High Steward of Ireland was first bestowed in 1446 upon John Talbot, 1st Earl of Shrewsbury by way of letters patent from King Henry VI. He was named Earl of Waterford and granted the hereditary office of Lord High Steward, to be passed down through the male heirs of his line. The lineage has remained unbroken, and the current holder of the position is Charles Chetwynd-Talbot, 22nd Earl of Shrewsbury, tracing his right to the office directly back to that original royal charter over 570 years ago.

== Contrast with offices in England and Scotland ==
The role of Lord High Steward in England is no longer hereditary. For instance, the Duke of Northumberland was granted the position for the Coronation of George V and Mary in 1911. Considered the highest Great Officers of State in order of precedence and also a supreme judge in Parliament, the Lord High Steward leads the new sovereign in processions. Carrying St Edward's Crown on a velvet cushion, the Lord High Steward walks ahead of the monarch. Adorned in robes of white satin and an under-garment of gold fabric, the Lord High Steward also wears a long red mantle and ermine tippet.

The Prince and Great Steward of Scotland is traditionally held by the Duke of Rothesay. As the current Duke of Rothesay is also Prince of Wales and Duke of Cornwall, he has many other responsibilities associated with those titles. Given the extent of his duties, at the last two coronations the Earl of Crawford was appointed as deputy to carry out the functions of Prince and Great Steward of Scotland on behalf of the Duke of Rothesay/Prince of Wales.

The position of Lord High Steward of Ireland is traditionally held by the Earls of Shrewsbury on a hereditary basis. While the role resembles that of the analogous position in England, the Attorney General clarified the nature and authority of the office in 1862. Historically, the title can be traced back to when King Henry II granted the office of Lord High Steward or Great Seneschal of Ireland to Sir Bertram de Verdun. William Lynch wrote extensively about this feudal dignity, office, and its hereditary descent patterns in his book on the topic of feudal titles.

== The hereditary nature of the office ==
Sir William Blackstone observes that there are offices, consisting of a right to exercise public or private employment, along with the fees and emoluments thereunto belonging, that are also incorporeal hereditaments, i.e., heritable. Examples include certain royal offices, such as the Lord High Steward of Ireland. The holder may have an estate in them, unto him and his heirs. Other offices may be for life or for a term of years. In his work, William Lynch devotes a chapter to such incorporeal hereditaments as "Honorary Hereditary Officers". He describes the dignity of Lord Constable conferred on Hugh de Lacy by original grant in 1185 of Meath. The Lord Constable of Ireland, originally vested with lands to which it was incident or annexed, and which descended through Walter's son Gilbert de Lacy to John de Verdun (ex jure uxoris Margaret) by virtue of his moiety of Meath (the other moiety descending to Geoffrey de Geneville, 1st Baron Geneville, ex jure uxoris Matilda). By 1460, the lands to which it had been incident were vested in Lord Theobald de Verdun's co-heirs, and, according to Lynch, the exercise of the office fell into desuetude.

William FitzAldelm, Chief governor of Ireland in 1176-7, was described as "Senescallus Hiberniae" or as "Dapifer".

"It is worthy of remark that the title of Seneschal was revived in 1444 in favour of John Talbot when he was created Earl of Shrewsbury, as his wife was descended from Lord Furnival [Thomas de Furnivall, 2nd Baron Furnivall] who had in marriage the eldest daughter of Theobald de Verdon, and his descendant Lord Fumival, who died in 1446, left a daughter and heiress Maud Neville, who named Lord Talbot, and in this way he became possessed of his wife's portion of Theobald de Verdon's estate in Meath, as also of Alveston, now Alton Towers."

It can be seen elsewhere that the Lord High Stewardship continued to be inherited by the Earls of Shrewsbury. In Letters of Appointment dated 27 August in the 28th year of King Henry VI, the first Earl of Shrewsbury who was also the Lord High Steward or Great Seneschal of Ireland, appointed John Penyngton to be Steward of the Liberty of Waterford, and in such appointment, the Earl is described as "Senescallus ac Constabularius Hiberniae". Further examples continue such as the case of George Talbot, 4th Earl of Shrewsbury, confirmed in an inquisition later in 1624, and recalled in a Case before the House of Lords in 1862, dealing with the Lord High Stewardship of Ireland. Such appointments by the Lords Shrewsbury of Stewards of Counties in Ireland were upheld by the House of Lords as proof of the exercise of the prerogatives of the Lord High Steward of Ireland. Furthermore, it was in his inherited capacity as Lord High Steward of Ireland that the 4th Earl of Shrewsbury, George Talbot, assisted at the coronation of King Henry VII in 1485. Charles Talbot, 12th Earl of Shrewsbury, in the same capacity as Lord High Steward of Ireland, assisted at the coronation of King James II in 1685. In both of these cases, the Lord High Steward carried the Curtana.

== Lapses in hereditary exercise of the office due to the Penal Laws ==
From the time of Henry VI, no English Monarch (except James II and William III during the civil war of 1690-2) was in Ireland until the visit of George IV in 1821. There was therefore during that period few if any occasion where the Earls of Shrewsbury could have exercised the duties of their office as Lords High Stewards of Ireland, about the person of the Sovereign.

As the Earls of Shrewsbury were at one time Roman Catholics, prior to Catholic Emancipation in Ireland, in 1829, they were prevented from effectively performing the judicial role of Lord High Steward. Hence, for example, in 1739, Thomas Wyndham, 1st Baron Wyndham was eight times one of the Lord Justices of Ireland, and officiated as Lord High Steward of Ireland in the trial of Henry Barry, 4th Baron Barry of Santry for murder and treason, being the first trial of a Lord by his Peers in the Kingdom of Ireland. Baron Wyndham of Finglass surrendered the offices of Lord Justice at his own request in 1739 on account of his ill-health.

The next trial of a peer was that of Nicholas Netterville, 5th Viscount Netterville, for murder in 1743, when Robert Jocelyn, 1st Viscount Jocelyn (Lord Chancellor of Ireland) presided as the acting Lord High Steward. The same ceremonials as for the trial of Lord Santry were used, but the case collapsed at the outset because the two principal witnesses had died. When the assembled peers judged Lord Netterville therefore not guilty, the Lord High Steward broke the white wand and adjourned the House.

The third case of a trial of a peer in Ireland by his peers was the trial of Robert King, 2nd Earl of Kingston, in May 1798, for the murder of a Henry Gerald Fitzgerald, the illegitimate son of his brother-in-law. In the absence of witnesses for the prosecution, he was found not guilty, and the Lord High Steward thereupon broke his wand of office. On that occasion, the duties of the Lord High Steward were discharged by John FitzGibbon, 1st Earl of Clare, who was also the Lord Chancellor of Ireland.

== Resumption upon Catholic Emancipation ==
It was only after the Roman Catholic Relief Act 1829 that John Talbot, 16th Earl of Shrewsbury could take his seat in Parliament. Recognising the Earl's claim to the Lord High Stewardship, King William IV was pleased to respond to his petition and grant to the Earl the privileges inherent in the Lord High Stewardship, namely wearing the court uniform, and having access to the King's levées by means of the private entrée, and of using the same upon other customary occasions.

The same continuity of lineal succession and right was also upheld in the case of the Chief Serjeantcy of Ireland, when it was found that neither a period of adverse possession, nor "nonusor nor mysusor" was held valid against the legitimate and upheld claim of the lineal heir, Walter Cruise, of the first grantee, centuries later, as decreed and adjudged on 13 November in the fifth year of the reign of Edward VI, and as recorded in Lynch's "Feudal Dignities".

Hence, the Earl of Shrewsbury subsequently took his place, as Lord High Steward of Ireland, amongst the High Officers of State at the funeral of King William IV, when Queen Victoria also appointed him to carry the Banner of Ireland. Subsequently, his precedence over the dukes of England as Hereditary Lord High Steward of Ireland was established in the Table of Precedency prepared in the Herald's Office and approved by Thomas de Grey, 2nd Earl de Grey in his capacity as Lord Lieutenant of Ireland in 1843; and similarly by Archibald Montgomerie, 13th Earl of Eglinton as Lord-Lieutenant of Ireland in 1858.

On 1 August 1862, the House of Lords made an Order. to confirm the right of the then Earl of Shrewsbury and Waterford, and Earl Talbot, Henry John, to the Office of Lord High Steward of Ireland.

== White Wand of Office ==
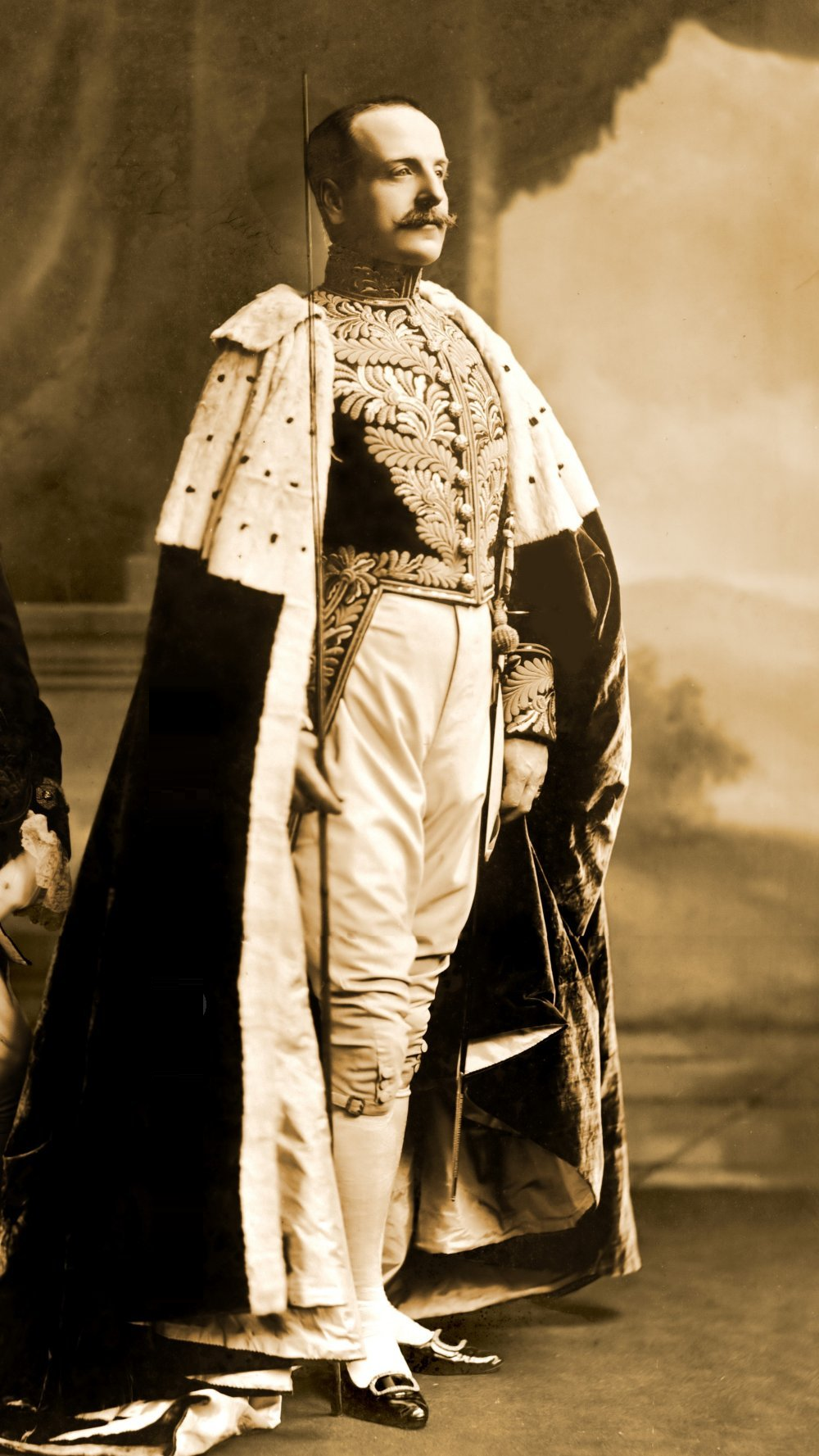
The 20th Earl of Shrewsbury (with white wand of office) dressed for the 1902 coronation.

Sir John Talbot (born 1803) took part in the installation of the Prince of Wales as a Knight of Saint Patrick at St. Patrick's Cathedral, Dublin on 18 April 1868. On 15 September 1871, Queen Victoria granted to Charles Chetwynd-Talbot, 19th Earl of Shrewsbury, "that he and the heirs male of his body, being Lords High Steward of Ireland, may carry a white wand when appearing officially in Ireland and when attending State ceremonials, and be placed at such ceremonies according to the Office of the Lord High Steward of Ireland ”. As Lord High Steward of Ireland he also had the right to wear 1st class Household uniform.

Accordingly, and subsequently, a white wand was used at coronations: Charles Chetwynd-Talbot, 20th Earl of Shrewsbury, carried a white wand at the Coronation of Edward VII and Alexandra in 1902, and at the Coronation of George V and Mary in 1911; his successor John Chetwynd-Talbot, 21st Earl of Shrewsbury carried a white wand at the coronation of George VI and Elizabeth in 1937 and at the Coronation of Elizabeth II in 1953.

The significance of the white wand can be found in its representation of the supreme judicial functions of the Lord High Steward, having been used by Thomas Wyndham, 1st Baron Wyndham in his interim capacity as acting Lord High Steward for the trial of Henry Barry, 4th Baron Barry of Santry. On that occasion, the customary Gentleman Usher of the Black Rod bore a white one, instead of black, for the Lord High Steward. Lord Santry was pardoned, and fled to England where he died.

Therein lies the significance of the white wand: it is a rod of office and the commission appointing a temporary Lord High Steward is dissolved according to custom by breaking the rod. This is also the customary practice for the Lord High Steward when operative in England (not being hereditary). However, the Earl of Shrewsbury, holding the Lord High Stewardship on a hereditary basis, can retain the rod, and hence Queen Victoria's authorisation that it be used at State ceremonials.

The white wand (or slat bhan) is also significant in the Gaelic/Brehon tradition of the inauguration of ancient Irish Kings. This is keenly observed in the inauguration of the O’Donnell, Prince of Tyrconnell. The significance of the white wand was described by Geoffrey Keating: It was the chronicler's function to place a wand in the hand of each lord [or king] on his inauguration; and on presenting the wand he made it known to the populace that the lord or king need not take up arms thenceforth to keep his country in subjection, but that they should obey his wand as a scholar obeys his master. For, as the wise scholar obeys and is grateful to his master, in the same way subjects are bound to their kings, for it is with the wand of equity and justice he directs his subjects, and not with the edge of the weapon of injustice.

Equally, for the Barons in Scotland, the wand of officers of a Barony is also a white wand, associated with Chiefship, and originally with the scepter of the Scottish King (or Ard-Righ), indicating also that the Scottish feudal baron is also a chef de famille, who reigns within his circle.

A glimpse of the historic roles of Lords Stewards or Seneschals can be obtained from the case of the inauguration of the O'Neill as prince at Tullahoge. The O'Cahan would cast a gold sandal over the head of the O'Neill prince elect, while the O'Hagan, Baron of Tullahoge, who was O'Neill's steward and justiciary for Tyrone, would present a straight wand, and then fasten the sandal to the Prince's foot.

The Lord High Steward has also been known as the Great Seneschal of Ireland, as mentioned earlier. Seneschal was also the term used in Ireland to denote the Steward of a Prescriptive Barony, or Manor (as the official would be called in England), before whom the Court Leet or view of frankpledge was held. More recently, the term Seneschal was also, apparently used to describe Donal Buckley, as the Governor-General of the Irish Free State in 1932.

== The Court of the Lord High Steward ==
The Court of the Lord High Steward in England was first formally instituted in 1499 for the trial of Edward Plantagenet, 17th Earl of Warwick and confirmed by act of Parliament. A precedent for the appointment of a deputy to execute in his place the duties of an Honorary Hereditary Officer of the Crown in Ireland is found in the license from King John in 1220 for John Marshal, to appoint a deputy to him as Lord Marshal, as well as in England/Scotland where the Earl of Crawford has deputised for the Lord High Steward of Scotland, who as Duke of Rothesay and Prince of Wales and Scotland had another role to attend to, namely as Heir Apparent.

The precedent for the appointment by the Lord High Steward of Ireland of a deputy as steward of a county is found in the case of the appointment by letters patent on 27 August in the 28th year of the reign of the Plantagenet King Henry VI of England (circa 1450) by John, the 1st Earl of Shrewsbury, of John Penyngton, Esq., as Steward of the Liberty of Wexford. This was acknowledged in evidence in the case lodged pursuant to the order of the House of Lords of 1 August 1862. The precedent for such a deputy within the Court of the Lord High Steward to be also appointed on a hereditary basis is found in the cases of the Grand Almoner of England, who is the Marquess of Exeter, the Grand Carver of England who is the Earl of Denbigh and Desmond and the Grand Falconer, who is the Duke of St. Albans. By precedent and analogy therefore, the Lord High Steward of Ireland has been able to appoint deputies, designated stewards or seneschals for counties, and on a hereditary basis.

Although this prerogative has not been exercised during the period of the Penal Laws, nor later in the absence of visits of the Sovereign to Ireland, the Lord High Steward's prerogative remains intact, and has been invoked in some appointments in the 20th century. Such appointments of deputies by Lords High Stewards (for example of Scotland or England) have been accepted in the past by the Court of Claims constituted at coronations, most recently in 1953.

The function of deputy to the Lord High Steward or Great Seneschal of Ireland is discharged under a related appointment of office, the Lord Steward for Tyrconnell, by letters patent of the Lord High Steward or Great Seneschal explicitly by virtue of the royal authority vested in him, to the grantee, and specifically to hold to him and his primogeniture heirs for ever. The function was assigned to the Hereditary Seneschal or Lord Steward for Tyrconnell, Patrick Denis O'Donnell (1922–2005). and subsequently inherited by his son, Francis Martin O'Donnell.

== Lord High Stewards of Ireland, 1446-present ==
- 1446–1453: John Talbot, 1st Earl of Shrewsbury and Waterford
- 1453–1460: John Talbot, 2nd Earl of Shrewsbury and Waterford
- 1460–1473: John Talbot, 3rd Earl of Shrewsbury and Waterford
- 1473–1538: George Talbot, 4th Earl of Shrewsbury and Waterford
- 1538–1560: Francis Talbot, 5th Earl of Shrewsbury and Waterford
- 1560–1590: George Talbot, 6th Earl of Shrewsbury and Waterford
- 1590–1616: Gilbert Talbot, 7th Earl of Shrewsbury and Waterford
- 1616–1617: Edward Talbot, 8th Earl of Shrewsbury and Waterford
- 1617–1630: George Talbot, 9th Earl of Shrewsbury and Waterford
- 1630–1654: John Talbot, 10th Earl of Shrewsbury and Waterford
- 1654–1667: Francis Talbot, 11th Earl of Shrewsbury and Waterford
- 1667–1718: Charles Talbot, 1st Duke of Shrewsbury, 12th Earl of Shrewsbury and Waterford
- 1718–1743: Gilbert Talbot, 13th Earl of Shrewsbury and Waterford
- 1743–1787: George Talbot, 14th Earl of Shrewsbury and Waterford
- 1787–1827: Charles Talbot, 15th Earl of Shrewsbury and Waterford
- 1827–1852: John Talbot, 16th Earl of Shrewsbury and Waterford
- 1852–1856: Bertram Talbot, 17th Earl of Shrewsbury and Waterford
- 1856–1868: Henry Chetwynd-Talbot, 18th Earl of Shrewsbury and Waterford
- 1868–1877: Charles Chetwynd-Talbot, 19th Earl of Shrewsbury and Waterford
- 1877–1921: Charles Chetwynd-Talbot, 20th Earl of Shrewsbury and Waterford
- 1921–1980: John Chetwynd-Talbot, 21st Earl of Shrewsbury and Waterford
- 1980–present:Charles Chetwynd-Talbot, 22nd Earl of Shrewsbury and Waterford

== Deputised Lord High Stewards of Ireland ==
The following were appointed to preside in the trials by the Irish House of Lords of Peers indicted for various crimes, and their ceremonial roles were limited to those appertaining to their temporary judicial role.

- 1628: Francis Aungier, 1st Baron Aungier of Longford (1558-1632)
- 1739: Thomas Wyndham, 1st Baron Wyndham (1681–1745)
- 1743: Robert Jocelyn, 1st Viscount Jocelyn (1727–1756)
- 1798: John FitzGibbon, 1st Earl of Clare (1749–1802)

See also Vice Great Seneschal of Ireland
