= O'Donnell House =

O'Donnell House may refer to:

== Ireland ==
- O'Donnell House (Ireland), All Hallows College, Drumcondra

== United States ==
- Miller–O'Donnell House, Mobile, Alabama
- Thomas O'Donnell House, Palm Springs, California, listed on the National Register of Historic Places (NRHP) in Riverside County
- Fobes-O'Donnell House, Oakham, Massachusetts
- I.D. O'Donnell House, Billings, Montana, listed on the NRHP in Yellowstone County
- E. J. O'Donnell House, near Portland, Oregon, NRHP-listed
- O'Donnell House (Sumter, South Carolina), NRHP-listed
- Patrick O'Donnell House, Charleston, South Carolina

== See also ==
- O'Donnell (disambiguation)
