= Dave P. Tyndall Jr. =

Irish businessman

David Patrick Tyndall Jr. (3 March 1917 – 30 June 2006) was an Irish businessman. He started out in a family business with his eponymous father and eldest brother William, and played a role in helping modernise the wholesale and retail grocery trade, consolidate it, and enable family grocery shop owners to adapt to the advent of supermarkets. Associated with a number of retail business in Ireland, he was also an amateur pilot. As of 2000, he was recognised by Guinness World Records as the oldest man to have, at that time, flown a helicopter solo.

== Personal life ==
He was a son of Sarah (née Gaynor) and David P. Tyndall (Sr.). He married Molly (née Kettle) in September 1949, and they had four children.

Tyndall lived in Dublin and died in June 2006.

== Business career ==
Tyndall's experience with mergers and acquisitions earned him the nickname "Take-over Tyndall" in Irish business circles. He absorbed many of the employees of wholesalers who closed down (Hugh, Moore & Alexander, Shirley Spence & Belford, McMaster, Hodgson, R. Jones & Co.), and introduced a bonus incentive scheme, and a scheme of non-contributory pensions for employees. He was behind the first initiative of an Irish wholesale group to establish a bonded warehouse to expand their wine and spirits business.

After his father's retirement, and in collaboration with his older brother William, he expanded the Tyndall interests to include retail stores, through joint ventures for self-service stores across Ireland. They resisted a 25% takeover bid by Irish businessman Tony O'Reilly in 1971. Eventually they sold AWL to Joshua Watson Ltd., and Dave Tyndall Jr. joined its board. It was later taken over by Irish Distillers, who were later taken over in 1988 by Pernod-Ricard.

William retired in 1980 and Dave retired in 1984, after fifty-one years in the grocery business.

== Aviation interests ==
Tyndall's aviation interests included involvement (as president) with the Leinster Aero Club, now based in TREVET (EITT), near Dunshaughlin, County Meath. The Leinster Aero Club was founded in 1956 and originally based at Weston Aerodrome. As of 2006, the club was based at Trevet Airfield near Dunshaughlin, County Meath.

In addition to being president of the Leinster Aero Club, Tyndall was treasurer of the Aircraft Owners & Pilots Association and the Irish Aviation Council. He was also a committee member of the National College of Industrial Relations.
