= Ballyhaise College =

Agricultural school in Ballyhaise, Ireland

Ballyhaise College is an agricultural college, based in the former Ballyhaise House, in Ballyhaise, County Cavan in Ireland. It is run by Teagasc and, as of 2023, had over 400 students. The college was founded in 1906 at the former Ballyhaise House, an 18th-century house with an estate consisting of 220 hectares of grassland and woodland.

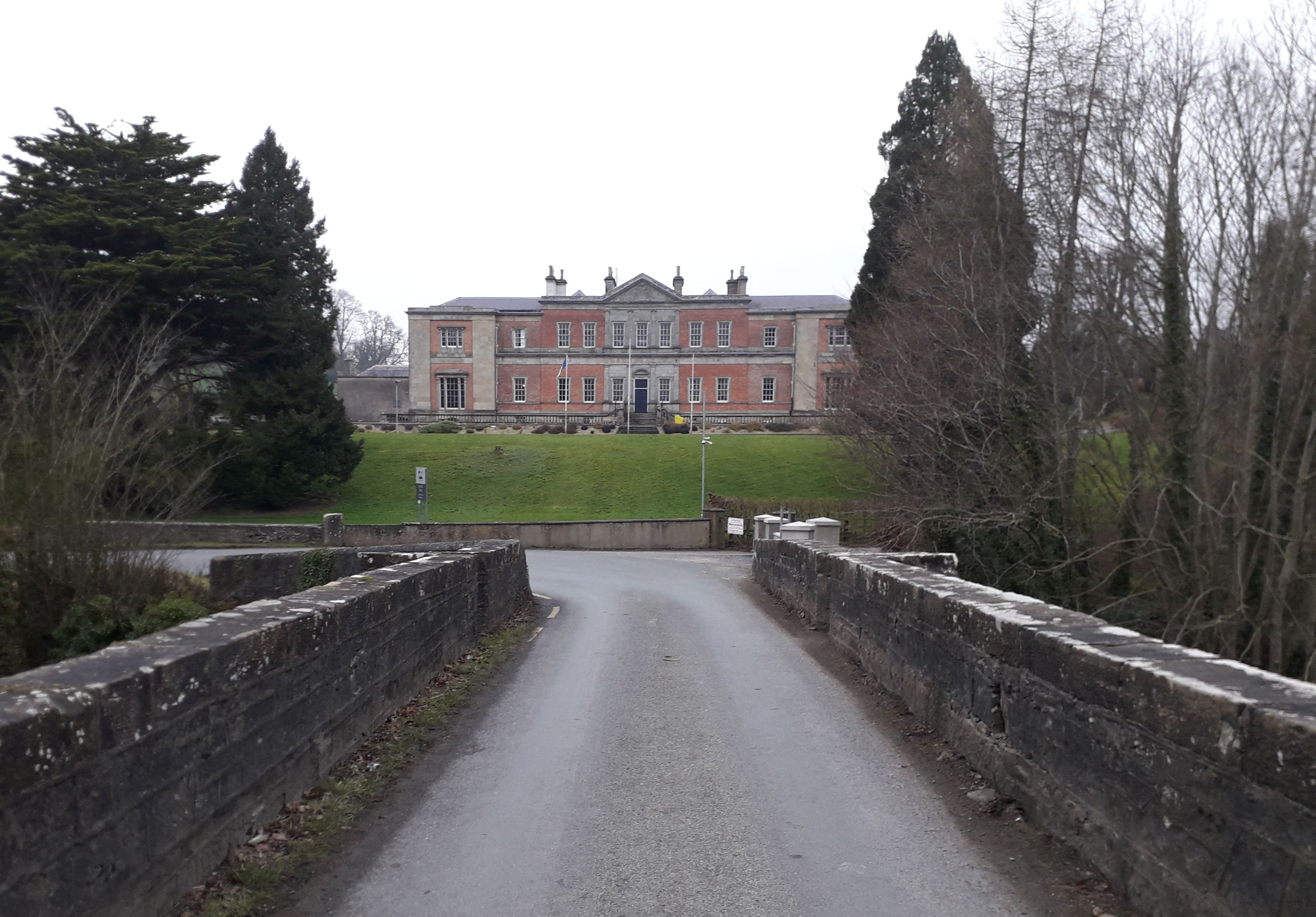
Ballyhaise bridge and College

The college specialises in training students for forestry and agricultural industry. In recent years the college has developed close contacts with Dundalk Institute of Technology(DKIT) allowing students to achieve HETAC validated courses, and progression to further study.

== Facilities ==
The college farm includes 50 hectares of woodland also kept on the farm is a dairy herd, other cattle, sheep and pigs. A large gym is used for sports, and there is a recreational area and computer facilities. Some student accommodation is also available.

== Alumni ==
- Denis O'Donnell - entrepreneur
- Seán Gallagher - TV personality, entrepreneur
