= Francis Martin O'Donnell =

Irish diplomat (born 1954)

His Excellency Francis Martin O'Donnell GCMM GCEG KC*SG KM KCHS KCMCO
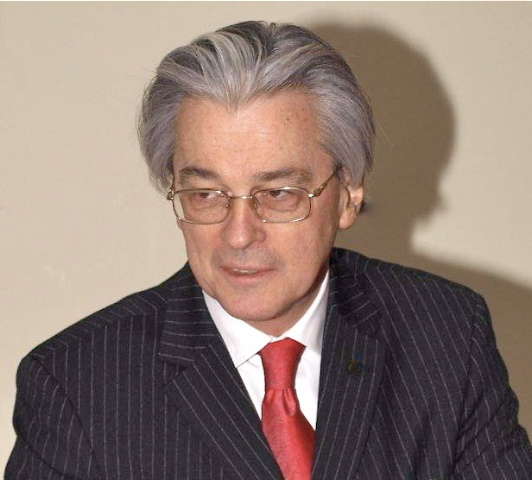
- Francis Martin O'Donnell in 2012

President Genealogical Society of Ireland
- Incumbent
- Assumed office March 2024

President Clan O'Donnell of Tyrconnell
- Incumbent
- Assumed office June 2024

Director/Trustee School of Civic Education
- In office October 2019 – December 2025

Chancellor/Seansailéir Order of Clans of Ireland
- In office May 2014 – April 2015

Director/Board Member Clans of Ireland
- In office September 2012 – April 2015

Ambassador of SMOM to Slovakia
- In office 7 December 2009 – 1 March 2013
- Preceded by: Mariano Hugo, Prince of Windisch-Graetz
- Succeeded by: Ottokarl Finsterwalder

Seneschal of Tyrconnell
- Incumbent
- Assumed office January 2005

Resident Coordinator UN/UNDP, Ukraine
- In office 1 October 2004 – 31 March 2009
- Preceded by: Douglas Gardner
- Succeeded by: Olivier Adam

Resident Coordinator UN/UNDP, FRY/Serbia and Montenegro
- In office 13 October 2000 – 30 September 2004
- Preceded by: Position established
- Succeeded by: Nicola Harrington

Personal details
- Born: 12 March 1954 (age 72) Dublin, Ireland
- Relations: O'Donnell of Tyrconnell; Cardinal Patrick O'Donnell; Patrick Denis O'Donnell; Denis O'Donnell; Maurice Moynihan; John Tyndall; David P. Tyndall; Mona Tyndall
- Education: University College Dublin
- Occupation: Diplomat; Director; Consultant; Author
- Website: www.odomhnaill.com

Francis Martin O'Donnell (born in 1954) is an Irish citizen who has served abroad as an international diplomat in senior representative positions with the United Nations until retirement, and later with the Sovereign Military Order of Malta. He was elected Fellow of the World Academy of Art and Science in July 2025. He was elected president of the Genealogical Society of Ireland effective March 2024, and President of the O'Donnell Clan Association in June 2024 He is a life member of the Institute of International and European Affairs (under the patronage of the president of Ireland). He currently continues to serve pro bono as an advisor to the Global Partnerships Forum and is a listed endorser of the NGO consortium known as Nonviolent Peaceforce. He served as Ambassador Extraordinary and Plenipotentiary of the Sovereign Military Order of Malta to the Slovak Republic from December 2009 to March 2013. He previously served as a United Nations official for 32 years, most recently as the Resident Coordinator of the United Nations system in Ukraine, from 30 September 2004 until 31 March 2009, and previously in the same capacity in Serbia-Montenegro. In early 2012, he was appointed to the council of the Order of Clans of Ireland, and was elected its chancellor in May 2014. He also served on the board of directors, and completed both terms of office in April 2015. Since then, he has participated in Globsec, the InterAction Council, and is a regular participant, panellist or moderator in the annual Global Baku Forum. He is also a speaker and panellist on global policy issues at seminars and forums of the Association of Schools of Political Studies of the Council of Europe, and was a director on the board of trustees of its School of Civic Education in London. He is a member of the Peacemaking Reflection Group of former senior UN officials under the auspices of the Foundation for Global Governance and Sustainability. He is an occasional guest speaker on Irish history and genealogy in Dublin, Madrid, Vienna, and at the Sorbonne in Paris. He is also a published author of a book and articles on global policy challenges, historical works and a first volume of poetry.

== Background ==
O'Donnell is the son of the late Patrick Denis O'Donnell, an Irish military historian and retired commandant of the Irish Defence Forces who served briefly as a military observer with UNTSO

== Education ==
Schooled in Jerusalem (Collège des Frères) and Dublin (St. Vincent's C.B.S., Glasnevin), he grew up largely in Fingal, and retains interests there. An honours graduate in Economics and Philosophy from the National University of Ireland at University College Dublin, O'Donnell read International Law and Diplomacy at postgraduate level in Geneva, and qualified in Disaster Management at the University of Wisconsin–Madison.

== UN career ==
O'Donnell joined the UN in 1976 on a volunteer assignment with United Nations Volunteers, running its programme in Sudan. He later served as a United Nations staff member in Lesotho, Mauritania, Niger, Switzerland, Turkey, and in United Nations Development Programme headquarters in New York. He then served as UN Resident Coordinator in Serbia & Montenegro and later in Ukraine until his retirement in 2009.

At the end of the Cold War, he was requested in late 1991 to launch a rapid response capability for deploying UN Volunteers (UNV) to UN emergency operations worldwide. Overhauling recruitment methods saw the rapid deployment of thousands of UN volunteers to crisis zones, where they became the front-line link between relief and aid delivery agencies such as UNICEF, UNHCR, WFP, UNDP, and WHO and suffering war victims, refugees and internally displaced persons. The effort saved lives during the years 1992–1994 in Afghanistan, Angola, Bosnia, Cambodia, Ethiopia, Kenya, Liberia, Rwanda, Somalia, Sudan and other war-torn countries during the inter-ethnic wars that succeeded the Cold War's proxy conflicts. True life stories from the field featured in Volunteers Against Conflict, a book praised by former presidents Nelson Mandela, Mary Robinson, Jimmy Carter, and Nobel Peace Laureate Rigoberta Menchú Tum.

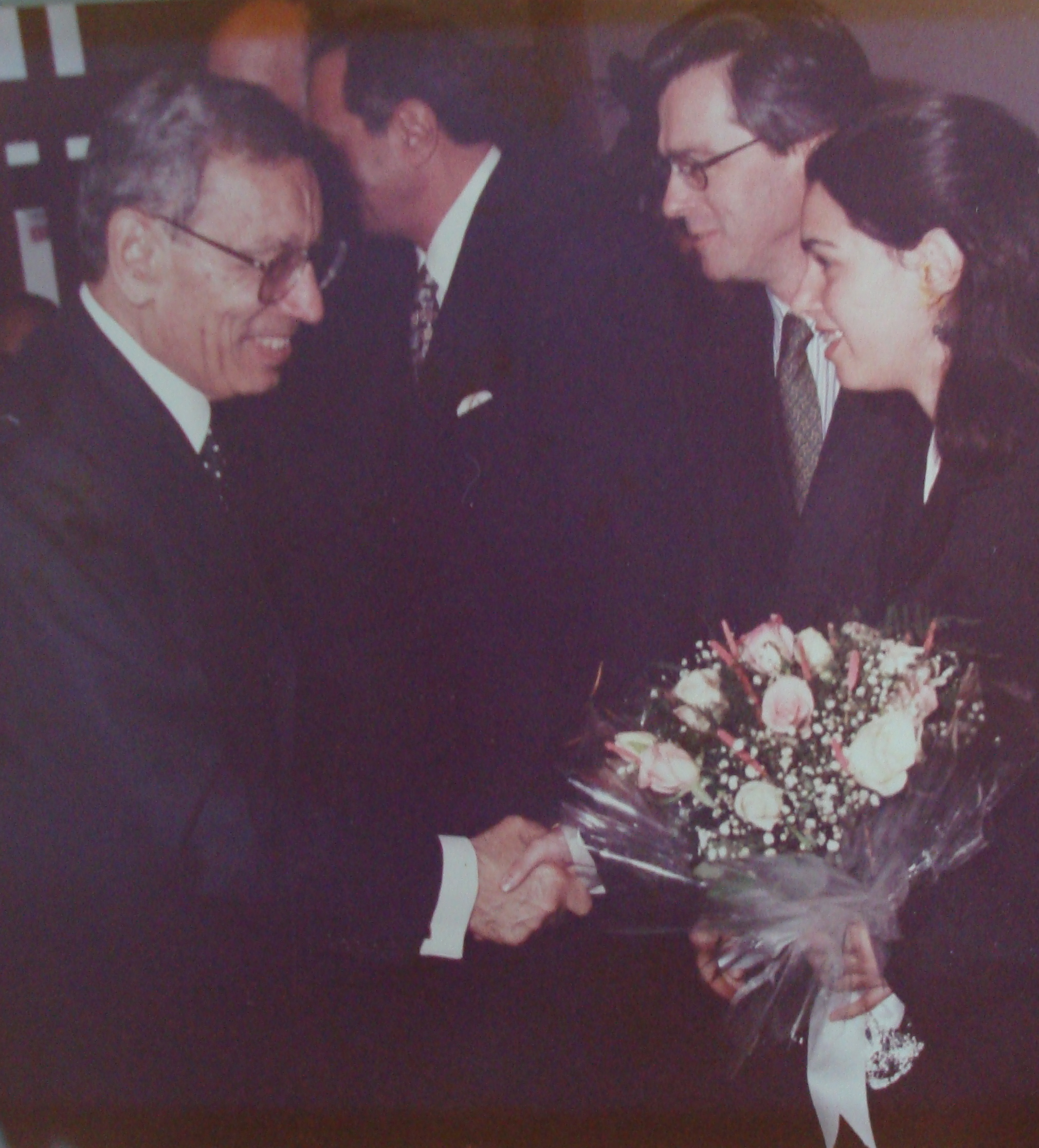
Boutros-Ghali & O'Donnell, Ankara, end-May 1996

Later based in Turkey, he helped assure the humanitarian corridor through Turkey into northern Iraq after the first Gulf War from 1994 to 1996, and coordinated earthquake relief in Turkey itself. Subsequently, he held a senior emergency management role in UNDP headquarters in New York, and later led a systemic governance team for crisis countries, developing a new policy approach to tackle root causes for preventing crisis in vulnerable countries.

In 2000, he led UN/UNDP missions that helped the late Sergio Vieira de Mello lay the foundations for public administration capacity in East Timor before independence. He organised a workshop with the Timorese leadership on 1 March 2000, that re-designed the UN administration in East Timor, leading to a reform of the UN mission by the Security Council. O'Donnell organised the joint workshop between UNTAET and the Timorese leadership, the National Congress for Timorese Reconstruction (CNRT), on 1 March 2000 to tease out a new strategy, and identify institutional needs. The Timorese delegation was led by Jose Ramos Horta. The outcome was an agreed blueprint for a joint administration with executive powers, including leaders of the CNRT. The effort was the "two-day retreat" described in Samantha Power's 2008 biography of Sergio, "Chasing the Flame". Further details were worked out in a conference in May 2000. The special representative of the UN Secretary-General in East Timor, Sérgio Vieira de Mello, presented the new blueprint to a donor conference in Lisbon on 22 June 2000, and to the UN Security Council on 27 June 2000. On 12 July 2000, the NCC adopted a regulation establishing a Transitional Cabinet composed of four East Timorese and four UNTAET representatives. The revamped joint administration constructed the institutional foundations for independence. On 27 September 2002 East Timor joined the United Nations.

On 13 October 2000, O'Donnell arrived in Belgrade in the immediate aftermath of the overthrow of the régime of Milošević. There, as UNDP representative, he supported the new democratic forces in bringing stability to the remnant of the former Yugoslavia (Serbia and Montenegro), preventing nascent conflict with marginalised ethnic Albanians in the Preševo Valley of southern Serbia, launching reintegration programmes, promoting human rights, and supporting reform of governance institutions and supporting civil society. In 2002, he was appointed by the UN Secretary-General Kofi Annan as Resident Coordinator of the UN system, and appointed by the UNDP Administrator Mark Malloch Brown as Resident Representative of the UNDP in Yugoslavia/Serbia-Montenegro, Following the Belgrade Agreement (2002) brokered by Javier Solana that restructured the remnant Federal Republic of Yugoslavia (Serbia and Montenegro) into a looser state union of Serbia and Montenegro, O'Donnell held consultations with the president of the federal government of Yugoslavia and leaders of the republics of Serbia and Montenegro, and organised a Strategic Roundtable on Governance Transition in Belgrade, featuring most of the signatories of the Belgrade Agreement, international experts on transition, and a large representation of government officials and the international community. It was the first major public forum bringing together important political players to air crucial constitutional issues. He also contributed to housing sector policy in south-east Europe.

Transferred to Ukraine, O'Donnell presented his credentials to outgoing president Leonid Kuchma on 16 November 2004. As Resident Coordinator, he was the designated representative of the UN Secretary-general and led the UN Country Team of UN agencies. Following the Orange Revolution, he fostered international support to the reform process under the auspices of UNDP through its Blue Ribbon Commission for Ukraine. The 2007 Ukrainian political crisis, which lasted from April to June 2007 was part of political stand off between coalition and opposition factions of Verkhovna Rada that led to the 2007 Ukrainian parliamentary election, culminating in a degradation of the parliamentary coalition under then-Prime Minister Viktor Yanukovych, as the president of Ukraine (Viktor Yushchenko) attempted to dissolve the parliament. In light of impending political unrest, O'Donnell as United Nations Resident Coordinator, and following an earlier call to deepen democracy and liberalise the economy, exceptionally issued an advisory statement of principles on behalf of the UN Country Team on 3 April 2007, followed by a visit by former Estonian president Arnold Rüütel on 23 April.

O'Donnell called for greater awareness of the Holocaust, and decried antisemitism and discrimination against Jews, Muslims, migrants and minorities in many countries. He was also instrumental in tackling racism and xenophobia in Ukraine, by organising regular consultations with the representatives of diplomatic missions and international organisations and jointly bringing this issue to the attention of Government. An ambassadorial working group was formed and a Diversity Initiative, under the leadership of the IOM and UNHCR, was established to provide a forum for developing anti-discrimination policies. As a result of concerted efforts, the Government stepped up its response to this challenge; an official repudiation of racism by President Viktor Yushchenko issued; the Government adopted an Action Plan on Counteraction to Racism; and the Security Service of Ukraine (SBU) established a special unit to counteract xenophobia and intolerance. Policy advice was provided and best practices from European countries was shared with Government. There was a wide-scale information campaign, including broadcasting of public service announcements.

O'Donnell also oversaw the establishment and implementation of the large UNDP-supported EU Border Assistance Mission between Moldova and Ukraine, which brought about substantial improvements in border management, including a curtailing of human trafficking, illicit weapons and other contraband smuggling, and corruption. He also coordinated UNDP co-operation under the BUMAD programme with Ukraine, Moldova and Belarus, to reduce illicit drug traffic. O'Donnell drew attention to the negative impact of endemic corruption in Ukraine, on co-operation with its development partners. He also launched a major programme for women's and children's rights, in collaboration with the EC, Council of Europe, and ILO. The first lady of Ukraine, Kateryna Yushchenko, in her farewell, thanked O'Donnell for his work in Ukraine and co-operation with her Ukraine 3000 Foundation. She credited him that UN institutions repeatedly rendered support to the foundation's initiatives related to education and culture. Also in 2007, the Ukraine 3000 International Charitable Foundation joined the United Nations Global Compact.

== Ambassadorship ==
On completion of O'Donnell's three years' mission as ambassador of the Sovereign Military Order of Malta to the Slovakia, the deputy prime minister of Foreign and European Affairs, Miroslav Lajčák emphasised O'Donnell's contributions in favour of endangered and marginalised groups of people, and in protecting vulnerable groups such as the Romani people, supporting the integration of Roma children into the school system. O'Donnell was awarded Slovakia's Golden Medal on 1 March 2013. The award was made in recognition of his personal contribution to the development of relations between the Sovereign Order and the Slovak Republic.

== Clans of Ireland ==
O'Donnell served as a director and board member of Clans of Ireland, an independent organisation established in 1989 to promote Irish clans and historical families, and also served as Chancellor on the Council for its Order of Merit, until 2015. As delegate of the Clan O'Donnell of Tyrconnell, he represented his Clan in 2012, 2013 and 2014 in the annual Parade of Clans at the Mansion House, Dublin. He was a keynote speaker at the O'Donnell Clan Gathering of 5–9 August 2013 in County Donegal, and presented research on the topic of the Ardfert expedition of 1601, as well as on a branch of O'Donnells who were Counts in France until extinct in 1879. In May 2013, on the occasion of the repatriation of the remains of the last reigning royal family of Yugoslavia, accorded a State Funeral by Serbia, O'Donnell laid a wreath at the cask of the late King Peter II of Yugoslavia, in his capacity as delegate of the Clans of Ireland and on behalf of Ireland's ancient royal and noble clans and historic families

== Council of Europe ==
After some years as a resource person/lecturer on matters of globalization, multilateralism, and governance, in October 2019, he was appointed as a director/trustee (2019-2025) of the School of Civic Education in London. The school was originally founded as the School of Political Studies (Московская школа политических исследований) in Moscow in 1992, which led to a proliferation of such schools across Central and Eastern Europe. These formed into an "Association of Schools of Political Studies of the Council of Europe" to educate civil society leaders in the democratic values, and under the auspices of the Council of Europe. The school has published several of his articles on its Sapere Aude website.

== Public life ==
O'Donnell proposed an Irish-Arab Society in November 1968, and it took shape through a group of Irish and Arab friends. It was the principal advocate of the Palestinian cause in Ireland during the 1970s and the 1980s and played a key advisory and facilitative role in promoting Irish-Arab trade and cultural links. With its support, Ireland established diplomatic relations with 12 states in the Middle East and North Africa between 1974 and 1976. He contributed towards the first White Paper on Irish Foreign Policy "Challenges and Opportunities Abroad", published in 1996, and is listed on page 342. He is a life member of the Institute for International and European Affairs and has participated in its work. Since the early 1990s, O'Donnell has participated in global peace advocacy and inter-faith dialogue He has served as advisor to the Nonviolent Peaceforce (Brussels), and as strategic advisor to the Global Partnerships Forum (New York City). He also attended the philanthropy roundtable of the World Economic Forum in Davos in 2009 and is a frequent contributor to international youth conferences.

For over a decade, O'Donnell has been a contributor, participant or moderator of discussions at the Global Baku Forum, comprising primarily 80-100 current and former presidents and prime ministers, hosted annually by the Nizami Ganjavi International Centre, and periodically presenting/participating in the work of the InterAction Council of Former Heads of State and Government. In 2014, he also actively advocated for Ukrainian sovereignty and territorial integrity following Russia's annexation of Crimea, and addressed the Irish Oireachtas parliamentary Joint Committee on Foreign Affairs and Trade on 9 April 2014 on "The Current Situation in Ukraine", in Leinster House, Dublin. He called for a robust and coordinated international response on Irish radio programmes: TodayFM, in English; Raidió na Gaeltachta, the national radio station in the Irish language, and on RTÉ 1, as well as on Serbian TV, RTS. His letter on the crisis was published by the Financial Times on 17–18 April 2014, to coincide with the "Quad" talks (EU, US, Russia, & Ukraine) in Geneva.

O'Donnell participated on 27–29 April 2015 in the 3rd Global Baku Forum on 2–29 April 2015 hosted by the Nizami Ganjavi International Centre in Azerbaijan. The Forum was an informal summit on "Building Trust in the Emerging World Order" attended by over 60 influential current and former heads of states and governments, and about another 140 politicians and prominent global public figures. He also participated in the 4th Global Baku Forum on 10–11 March 2016, moderating a panel discussion on Ukraine, and comprising Vaira Vīķe-Freiberga, President of Latvia (1999–2007), Co-chair of NGIC and President of the Club of Madrid; Viktor Yushchenko, President of Ukraine (2005–2010); Bronisław Komorowski, President of Poland (2010–2015); Bertie Ahern, Taoiseach (prime minister) of Ireland (1997–2008); Viktor Zubkov, Prime Minister of Russia (2007–2008) currently chairman of Gazprom; and Daniel Ioniță, State Secretary for Strategic Affairs, Romania,

He also participated in the VIII High-Level Meeting in Andorra la Vella, 12–14 June 2016, and moderated two of the four panels of current/former heads of state/government and other eminent global leaders These were: (a) the panel on "Re-thinking Globalisation" comprised Abdiweli Sheikh Ahmed, Prime Minister of Somalia (2013–2014); Amre Moussa, secretary-general of the Arab League (2001–2011); Ana Blazeska, State Secretary for European Affairs, Republic of Macedonia; Ismail Serageldin, director, Library of Alexandria (Egypt), and former vice president of the World Bank; Iveta Radičová, Prime Minister of Slovakia (2010–2012); Manuel Montobbio, Ambassador of Spain to Andorra; and Zlatko Lagumdzija, Prime Minister of Bosnia-Hercegovina (2001–2002); and the panel on "The Trump Effect", comprising Boris Tadić, President of Serbia (2004–2012); Eka Tkeshelashvili, Deputy Prime Minister of Georgia (2010–2012), Kateryna Yushchenko, First Lady of Ukraine (2005–2010), and Vaira Vike-Freiberga, President of Latvia (1999–2007) and current president of the Club de Madrid

At the IX High-Level Meeting in Sarajevo, 22–23 November 2016, on "The European Peace: What is the Recipe for a Strong Union for All", he participated in the Panel on "Getting Multiculturalism in Europe Back on Track", moderated by Dr. Franco Frattini, Minister of Foreign Affairs of Italy (2002–2004), along with Emil Constantinescu, President of Romania (1996–2000), Dr. Ismail Serageldin, Farida Allaghi, Libya's ambassador to the European Union, and Ambassador Jakob Finci, head of the Jewish Community in Bosnia-Hercegovina.

At the 5th Global Baku Forum in March 2017: he participated in a panel on "Extremism and populism as threats to international security" moderated by Kateryna Yushchenko, First Lady of Ukraine (2005–2010), and including Emil Constantinescu, President of Romania (1996–2000); Laimdota Straujuma, Prime Minister of Latvia (2014–2016); Hikmet Çetin, Deputy Prime Minister of Turkey (1978–1979, 1995) and Speaker (1997–1999), foreign minister (1991–1994); Scilla Elworthy, founder of the Oxford Research Group; Alexander Likhotal, former president of Green Cross International; and Farida Allaghi. Later in that year, on 20 November 2017, he moderated an international forum panel discussion in Brussels on "The Threats of Separatism to International Peace and Security", comprising Victor Yushchenko, President of Ukraine (2005–2010) and former governor of its National Bank;Dalia Itzik, President of Israel (2007, ad interim) & Speaker of the Knesset (2006), former deputy mayor of Jerusalem; Prof. Hasan Muratović, Prime Minister of Bosnia & Hercegovina (1996–1997), and former university rector; Dumitru Braghiș, Prime Minister of Moldova (1999–2001); Robert Ilatov, Member of the Knesset for the Yisrael Beiteinu Party; Nazim Ibrahimov, minister/chairman of the State Committee on Work with Diaspora, Azerbaijan; Jesús López-Medel Báscones, former chairperson of the Committee of Human Rights and Democracy of the OSCE; and Ali Hasanov, Public and Political Issues Advisor to the president of Azerbaijan. Later that day, O'Donnell participated in a panel on Cybersecurity in European Politics, along with former president of Ukraine, Victor Yushchenko (2005–2010) on 20 November in the European Horizons' Youth Summit 2017 in the College of Europe in Bruges. At the 6th Global Baku Forum, 14–17 March 2018, he moderated the panel on "The Religious and Cultural Divide: What role for Political Leadership?". The panel consisted of Fernando Lugo, President of Paraguay (2008–2012); Ali Ahmadov, Deputy Prime Minister of Azerbaijan; Akramsho Felaliev, vice chairman of the Parliament of the Republic of Tajikistan; Hikmet Çetin, Minister of Foreign Affairs of Turkey (1991–1994); Ambassador Antonio Zanardi Landi, former diplomatic advisor to the president of Italy and current ambassador of the Sovereign Order of Malta to the Holy See; Maksatbek Toktomushev, Grand Mufti of the Kyrgyz Republic, and Hamad Amar, Deputy Speaker of the Knesset in Israel. He has also participated in the 7th Global Baku Forum, 14–16 March 2019.

O'Donnell moderated the panel on "Globalisation and Growing Inequalities" at the IX Global Baku Forum on "Threats to the Global World Order" in Baku, Azerbaijan on 18 June 2022. The panel included Rosalía Arteaga Serrano, former president of Ecuador, Laimdota Straujuma, former prime minister of Latvia; Emil Constantinescu, former president of Romania; Katalin Bogyay, president of the 38th Session of the UNESCO General Conference; Mats L. Karlsson, former vice-president of the World Bank; and Garry Jacobs, president of the World Academy of Art and Science;. At the X Global Baku Forum on the theme "The World Today - Challenges and Hopes", he moderated the Panel 9 - "The Search for Peace, Stability and Development in the Middle East and Beyond", comprising Prince Turki bin Faisal Al Saud, Amr Moussa former secretary general of the Arab League, and Ekmeleddin İhsanoğlu, former secretary-general of the Organisation of Islamic Cooperation, with robust interventions by Ehud Olmert, former prime minister of Israel, Dalia Itzik former interim president of Israel and Speaker of the Knesset, and Gila Gamliel, serving minister of intelligence of Israel, inter alia.

He also presented a paper on Brexit "Parturition beyond Partition" to an expert panel and the plenary meeting of the InterAction Council's 34th Annual Plenary Meeting on 30 May-1 June 2017 in Dublin, co-chaired by Bertie Ahern, Taoiseach (prime minister) of Ireland, (1997–2008) and Olusegun Obasanjo, President of Nigeria (1999–2007), and has also participated in other IAC high-level expert meetings on social inclusion and migrants and refugees (Limassol, Cyprus, March 2019) At the 37th Annual Plenary Meeting of the InterAction Council in Valletta, Malta, on 15–17 May 2023, O'Donnell presented proposals for the Malta Declaration that would ensue, and presented his monograph Desperate Hope - Reflections on Survival Pathways for Civilisation, following a high-level panel on "A New Agenda for Peace and Security", chaired by Bertie Ahern

He delivered a talk on "Globalisation and Multilateralism" to seminars on Civic Education for a Society of Citizens, under the auspices of the Association of Schools of Political Studies of the Council of Europe, in Helsinki, Finland, 12 March 2018, co-sponsored by the Council of Europe, Finland (MFA) and the UK ([Foreign and Commonwealth Office]), and in Riga, Latvia 17–21 March 2019, hosted by the Stockholm School of Economics in Riga in collaboration with the Stockholm Institute of Transition Economics. He addressed the subject of globalisation again under the theme "In the Search of Lost Universalism" at the Berlin Forum 2018, under the auspices of Association of Schools of Political Studies of the Council of Europe and hosted by the Konrad Adenauer Foundation, Berlin, 26–27 November 2018. He also presented reflections on Multilateralism and the Future of Global Governance, in a conference presentation, for the subsequent 6th International Berlin Forum In Search of Lost Universalism, held by Zoom online, on 21 November 2020 by the Association of Schools of Political Studies of the Council of Europe in collaboration again with the Konrad Adenauer Foundation.. He lectured on "The Ecology of Multilateralism" at the Segovia Seminar of the Association of Schools of Political Studies of the Council of Europe, held in Spain on 26–29 May 2019. . O'Donnell was a panellist in the presidential symposium on "The Idea of Europe" , held under the auspices of the president of Lithuania, Gitanas Nausėda, in Kaunas on 25 November 2022, and including the presidents on Latvia, Egils Levits; Poland, Andrzej Duda; and Romania Klaus Iohannis, along with online addresses by the president of the European Commission, Ursula von der Leyen, and the president of Ukraine, Volodymyr Zelenskyy .

Alarmed that the United Nations Security Council has not been able to reach agreement on a draft resolution put before it on COVID-19, O'Donnell is one of the signatories of the global appeal by world leaders to "Support the UN Secretary-General's Urgent Call for an Immediate Global Ceasefire amid the COVID-19 Pandemic". The appeal calls "to put armed conflict on lockdown and to come together to focus on the true fight of our lifetime". O'Donnell was a signatory of the letter démarche of 15 April 2022 of former senior UN system staff urging UN Secretary General Antonio Guterres to act decisively and politically on the Russian aggression against Ukraine, following which he visited Moscow and Kyiv and in a follow-up démarche to the G20 leaders meeting in Bali . O'Donnell has participated in the subsequent multiple debates, appeals and démarches undertaken by the Peacemaking Reflection Group of former senior UN officials convening under the auspices of the Foundation for Global Governance and Sustainability including appeals to and for the Secretary-General of the United Nations, appeals for securing the Zaporizhzhia Nuclear Power Plant, statements on the Gaza war, and contributions to the New Agenda for Peace.

== Media ==
O'Donnell has contributed to various print and broadcast news outlets.

== Other interests ==
Based on his original research into various subjects, several of his articles on historical matters have been published in scholarly journals in Ireland, such as The Irish Sword – Journal of the Military History Society of Ireland, and the Journal of the Kerry Archaeological and Historical Society, and on the academic networking site Academia.edu. The Law Reform Commission has noted his work. leading to the Land and Conveyancing Law Reform Act O'Donnell inherited titles from his father, namely Lord of Fingal and Seneschal of Tyrconnell. O'Donnell also addressed the 2nd International Colloquium on Nobility, hosted in Madrid by the Real Asociación de Hidalgos de España, 21 October 2017, on the subject of "Irish Nobility and Armigerous Families" and also advocated for participating organisations to register their heraldic and nobiliary traditions under UNESCO's 2003 Convention for the Safeguarding of Intangible Cultural Heritage. O'Donnell co-organised the first webinar of the College of St Anthony of Padua, Leuven, held on 21 October 2020, under the theme Memorialising Émigré Dignity.

In 2018, Academica Press published his book The O'Donnells of Tyrconnell – A Hidden Legacy, to the acclaim of several Irish historians and genealogists. He has extensively commented on the recent Spanish archaeological investigations for the remains of Red Hugh O'Donnell in Valladolid. His first volume of poetry No Man's Land - Selected Poetry & Art was published in early 2020. In 2023, his monograph Desperate Hope - Reflections on Survival Pathways for Civilisation was presented to the InterAction Council of Former Heads of State and Government at its 37th Annual Plenary Meeting in Valletta, Malta, in support of its Malta Declaration on Multilateral Solutions for a Better Future.

== Published works ==
- Meeting the Humanitarian Challenge – Between Conflict and Development, foreword by Brenda McSweeney, Executive Coordinator (edited by Maria Keating); 43-page booklet published by United Nations Volunteers, Geneva, 1995.
- Third Party Civilian Peace Processes in Conflict Situations, second chapter (pp. 11–24) in Civil Intervention – The Role of NGOs in Conflict Prevention, published by Pax Christi International, Brussels, 1995.
- International Cooperation for Drug Control, article published in Turkish Daily News, Ankara, 30 June 1995.
- Tolerance: Respecting Diversity in a Complex World, pp. 25–38, second chapter of 258-page book Uluslararasi Hosgoru Kongresi – International Congress on Tolerance BILDIRILER published by Ministry of Culture, Turkey, in November 1995. OCLC 37805997.
- Tomorrow's Turkey Today – The Ankara Roundtable on Human Sustainability, (163 pages), contribution in pp. 119–122 on the linkage between global governance and local environmental management, published by Indigenous Development International, Cambridge, UK, in 1996 (ISBN 1-900164-01-9).
- Some Foreign Policy Options for Ireland (40-page monograph submitted by invitation for consideration by the Government of Ireland in the preparation of a White Paper on Foreign Policy presented to Dáil, Irish Parliament in 1996 Challenges and opportunities abroad : white paper on foreign policy /), Ankara, May 1995. The monograph has been subsequently lodged by the Government of Ireland in the National Archives.
- A Day in the Life, published in UCD Connections, worldwide magazine of University College Dublin Alumni, inaugural issue no.1 (ISSN 0791-8747), Dublin, Spring/Summer 1997.
- Wealth of Dignity, Poverty of Destiny – article published in O'Domhnaill Abu, Newsletter no. 32, Summer 2004 of the Clan Association index of the O'Donnells of Tyrconnell (ISSN 0790-7389).
- An opportunity for greatness, Kyiv Post, 21 April 2011
- Global Stability through Multilateralism – Why a strong United Nations is essential to defend freedom and ensure prosperity, published (pp 11–15 in Ukrainian, and 16–19 in English) in Memory of Centuries: Ukraine in the UN – 60th anniversary, published by the General Directorate for Rendering Services to the Diplomatic Missions [chief editor: Stanislav Nikolayenko], issue no.5 (56) 2005.
- The Crisis in Gaza, published in Irish Times, 2 August 2014
- The Chevalier Michel O'Donnell (1730–1807) – a Wild Goose from Mullet, published in The Irish Sword, vol. XXX, no. 119, journal of the Military History Society of Ireland, Summer 2015 (pp 71–78; preview: The Chevalier Michel O'Donnell (1730-1807) - A Wild Goose from Mullet).
- The Kerry Days of the Knights of Hospitaller, published in the Journal of the Kerry Archaeological and Historical Society, Series 2, Volume 15, Tralee, 2015 (Preview: The Kerry Days of the Knights Hospitaller).
- Martyrs for Europe, published on www.academia.edu on 10 September 2015. Martyrs for Europe
- Global Baku Forum is an important platform for discussing topical issues, interview published by Azertac, Baku, 13 March 2016 , relayed also on AzerNews .
- A personal reflection on St. Patrick's Day and the meaning of life, published on www.academia.edu on 17 March 2016 A personal reflection on St. Patrick's Day and the meaning of life.
- Parturition beyond Partition, published on www.academia.edu on 2 April 2017, and presented to the 34th Annual Plenary Meeting of the InterAction Council .
- St. Columba (521–597 A.D.), published on www.academia.edu on 24 May 2017 St. Columba (521-597 A.D.).
- Princes of the O'Donnells – Some Portraits of the Baronets O'Donnell of Newport, published on www.academia.edu on 27 September 2017 " Princes of the O'Donnells " Some Portraits of the Baronets O'Donnell of Newport.
- У России нет никакого страшного оружия (Russia has no terrible weapons – referring to Putin's boasts of nuclear-powered hypersonic missiles), published by Inosmi, Moscow, 20 March 2018 based on relayed interview with Jeyhun Najafov, published by Haqqin (Azeri News Agency), Baku, 20 March 2018
- Sir Desmond Lorenz de Silva, QC (1939-2018) - A posthumous appreciation, published on www academia.edu, June 2018 Sir Desmond Lorenz de Silva, QC (1939-2018) - A posthumous appreciation
- Une famille partie avec les "Oies Sauvages" oubliée - Les comtes O'Donnell en France, ou le passage de l'ancienne chevalerie militaire à la haute fonction publique, published on www.academia.edu, Sorbonne, October 2018 Une famille partie avec les « Oies Sauvages » oubliée - Les comtes O'Donnell en France, ou le passage de l'ancienne chevalerie militaire à la haute fonction publique
- The O'Donnells of Tyrconnell – A Hidden Legacy, published by Academica Press LLC in London and Washington, D.C., 2018, (750 pages), endorsed by several historians and genealogists (ISBN 978-1-680534740). The O'Donnells of Tyrconnell – A Hidden Legacy (Maunsel Irish Research Series) | Academica Press .
- Globalisation and Multilateralism, based on his guest lectures in Helsinki and Berlin under the auspices of the Association of Schools of Political Studies of the Council of Europe, and published (in Russian language) by the Moscow School of Civic Education in its quarterly journal, Obschaya Tetrad, no. 3-4 (75), Moscow, 2018 (ISBN 978-5-93895-120-4) (pp. 34–51) Московская школа гражданского просвещения Глобализация и общество - (Globalization and Society) [in Russian], published in "Общая тетрадь" (Bulletin of the School of Civic Education), Moscow, 2018 Глобализация и общество - (Globalization and Society) [in Russian]
- Irish Nobility and Armigerous Families, his chapter in Actas – Il Coloquio Internacional Sobre La Nobleza (2nd International Colloquium on Nobility, Madrid 20–21 October 2017), published by the Real Asociación de Hidalgos de España, Madrid, 2019 (paperback, ISBN 978-84-948410-5-7).
- The Ghost of Ballyheigue Castle, published on www.academia.edu, 2019 The Ghost of Ballyheigue Castle
- An Irish Princess in Exile, published on www.academia.edu, 2019 An Irish Princess in Exile
- Early radical action required to fight Coronavirus COVID-19, published on www.academia.edu, March 2020 Early radical action required to fight Coronavirus COVID-19
- The Very Rev. Fr. Thomas O'Donnell, C.M. (1864-1949), President of All Hallows College – A Biographical Sketch, published on www.academic.edu, April 2020 Fr Thomas O'Donnell, C.M. - A Biography
- Coronavirus and UN Reform, an article in How do we lead in an uncertain world? in the special edition of Global Policy Analysis, the flagship journal of the Nizami Ganjavi International Center, Baku, April 2020
- No Man's Land – Selected Poetry & Art, published by Tyrconnell-Fyngal Publishing, Dublin, 2020.(ISBN 978-1-9162891-0-9) No man's land : selected poetry & art / No Man's Land : Selected Poetry & Art.
- Coronavirus - An Opportunity for Global Governance Reform, an article published in Metropole, Austria's English language magazine, Vienna, 4 April 2020 Coronavirus | An Opportunity for Global Governance Reform
- How to make the 5th of April a meaningful International Day of Conscience (in Russian), published by the School of Civic Education, under the auspices of the Association of Schools of Political Studies of the Council of Europe Как сделать 5 апреля — Международный день осознанности — по-настоящему осмысленным
- The O'Donnells of Tyrconnell – A Hidden Legacy: a note on the research behind my book, article in the annual Journal, Volume 21, 2020, published by the Genealogical Society of Ireland, Dún Laoghaire Journal of the Genealogical Society of Ireland - Volume 21 (2020) - ISSN 2712-0228 by Genealogical Society of Ireland - Issuu [www.familyhistory.ie].
- The Cholera Pandemic of the 1830s, the Code Vicinal and modernization in France, published on www.academia.edu, May 2020 The Cholera Pandemic of the 1830s, the Code Vicinal and modernization in France
- Red Hugh O'Donnell – Further background on the search for his remains, published on www.academia.edu, May 2020 Red Hugh O'Donnell - Further background on the search for his remains
- The Burial Place of Red Hugh O'Donnell in the Convent of Saint Francis in Valladolid, published on www.academia.edu, June 2020 The Burial Place of Red Hugh O'Donnell In the Convent of Saint Francis in Valladolid
- 'Red' Hugh O'Donnell merece ser enterrado en la Abadía de Donegal, interview with J. A. Pardal, published 7 June 2020 by El Norte de Castilla, Valladolid, Spain, 7 June 2020.
- The Church and the United Nations in 2020 - Reflections, published on www.academia.edu, June 2020 The Church and the United Nations in 2020 - Reflections
- Donegal Abbey as a mausoleum for the return of the remains of Red Hugh O'Donnell, Sovereign of Tyrconnell, published on www.academia.edu, June 2020 Donegal Abbey as a mausoleum for the return of the remains of Red Hugh O'Donnell, Sovereign of Tyrconnell
- The O'Donnell Dynasty and Donegal Abbey, published on www.academia.edu, June 2020 The O'Donnell Dynasty and Donegal Abbey
- How to Honour the Heritage of Red Hugh O'Donnell, front cover lead story, Ireland's Genealogical Gazette, Vol. 1, No.6, Genealogical Society of Ireland, June 2020 ISSN 1649-7937 Ireland's Genealogical Gazette (June 2020) by Genealogical Society of Ireland - Issuu
- Leadership Challenges in Post-COVID-19 Recovery, published on www.academia.edu, July 2020 Leadership Challenges in Post-COVID-19 Recovery. Also published by the Association of Schools of Political Studies of the Council of Europe, in Russian as Вызовы для лидерства в эпоху восстановления после кризиса COVID-19, in Sapere Aude online - Вызовы для лидерства в эпоху восстановления после кризиса COVID-19;
- What did they really look like? An Iconography of the O'Donnells of Tyrconnell: myth, allegory, prejudice and evidence, published on www.academia.edu, August 2020 What did they really look like? An Iconography of the O'Donnells of Tyrconnell: myth, allegory, prejudice, and evidence
- Brexit Endgame – the UK's Identity Crisis (A reflection re-visited), published on www.academia.edu, December 2020 Brexit Endgame - the UK's Identity Crisis (A reflection re-visited)
- Multilateralism and the Future of Global Governance, conference presentation, 6th International Berlin Forum In Search of Lost Universalism, Zoom online, 21 November 2020; Conference paper published on www.academia.edu Multilateralism and the Future of Global Governance, and Russian summary - Как реформировать ООН и вернуть мир к многосторонности?, published by the Association of Schools of Political Studies in Sapere Aude online - «Государство является одним из нескольких игроков с универсалистским потенциалом, но этот потенциал очень ограничен»; video link: - YouTube
- Coronavirus and UN Reform, article in How do we lead in an uncertain world? Special Edition of Global Policy Analysis, the flagship journal published by the Nizami Ganjavi International Center, Baku, April 2020 (pp. 28–31) NGIC
- Missing in Action: The Real America, published by Metropole, Vienna, 14 January 2021 also published on www.academia.edu, October 2020 Missing in Action: The Real America
- Leadership challenges in Post-COVID19 Recovery, article in Global Policy Analysis, 3rd edition, September–October 2020, published by the Nizami Ganjavi International Center, Baku, Azerbaijan, (pp. 16–17) NGIC
- Declaration: Recognizing the global climate crisis and the need for governments worldwide to take immediate decisive action to reduce the impact of climate change, - A call towards the COP26 global summit in Glasgow, signed by over 50 members of the Nizami Ganjavi International Center including 30 former president and Prime Ministers, published by the Nizami Ganjavi International Center, Baku, October 2021 NGIC.
- Red Hugh O'Donnell (brief article on archaeological research for remains), in Ireland's Genealogical Gazette, volume 16, number 11, published by the Genealogical Society of Ireland, November 2021 ISSN 1649-7937 Ireland's Genealogical Gazette (Samhain : नवंबर : November 2021) by Genealogical Society of Ireland - Issuu
- Russian Roulette – the Kremlin's game in Ukraine, East-West Bridge, Belgrade, 7 March 2022
- UN must impose a no-fly zone over Ukraine, The Kyiv Independent, 10 March 2022
- "Emergency Now: Urgent UN action is required for Ukraine". New Europe. 11 March 2022. Archived from the original on 18 March 2023.
- Emergency now: Urgent UN Action is Required for Ukraine, published by Nova Era Global, NE Global Media Ltd., London, UK, 11 March 2022
- Nine Months is Enough, article in Katoikos World, Brussels, 3 November 2022, published by the Foundation for Global Governance and Sustainability . Also as headline article in NE Global, 4 November 2022, published by Nova Era Global, NE Global Media Ltd., London, UK
- The International Community must prepare for a post-Putin Russia, article published online by the Atlantic Council, Washington DC., 7 November 2022
- Пора готовится к тому, какой будет Россия после Путина (Russian) Час готуватися до того, якою буде Росія після Путіна (Ukrainian), published online by NV Media (Novoe Vremya/New Voice) of Media-DK Publishing House LLC, Ukraine, 11 November 2022 , also on Academia.edu
- Почему мир должен помочь не только Украине - Как международное сообщество может подготовиться к постпутинской России (Why the world should help not only Ukraine - How the international community can prepare for a post-Putin Russia), published online by Sapere Online, 14 November 2022
- Neutral but not neutered: Ireland's security needs to be nurtured, published by Nova Era Global, NE Global Media Ltd., London, UK on 14 December 2022
- Russia is less than its myths, Katoikos World, Brussels, 28 January 2023, published by the Foundation for Global Governance and Sustainability .
- Desperate Hope - Reflections on Survival Pathways for Civilisation, published by Tyrconnell-Fyngal Publishing, Dublin, 2023 (103 pages) ISBN 978-1-9162891-1-6 (Excerpt: ).
- Desperate Hope, article published in Horizons, Journal of International Relations and Sustainable Development, CIRSD, Belgrade, Summer 2023, Issue No. 24)
- A world in disarray – we can do better than this, article published in Katoikos World, Brussels, 10 December 2023, published by the Foundation for Global Governance and Sustainability
- The Flight of the Girls, article in the annual Journal of the Genealogical Society of Ireland, Volume 24, 2023 ISSN 2712-0228

== Policy monographs ==
- The Concept and Promotion of Global Peace Service, paper presented as invited Guest Speaker at the "Global Peace Service" Conference at the Church Center for the United Nations, U.N. Plaza, New York, November 1993.
- Humanitarian Access and the Opportunity for Building-up Peace from the Grassroots, paper presented upon invitation to international seminar on "Towards a Global Alliance of Peace Services", held by the Christian Council of Sweden, and Life & Peace Institute, at Stensnas, Stockholm, Sweden, May 1994.
- Conflict Prevention, Response, and Post-Conflict Recovery, paper presented at meeting with European Commission (DG VIII), Brussels, November 1997.
- Foundations for Governance and Public Administration in East Timor, basic framework for initial capacity building in East Timor, according to the late SRSG Sergio Vieira de Mello, who endorsed and presented it to Lisbon Donors Conference, on 21 June 2000, and reported it to the UN Security Council on 27 June 2000.
- Martyrs for a European ideal: how the refugee crisis is transforming European values and outlook, published in www.academia.edu, 10 September 2015.

== Other references/citations ==
- Towards a Global Alliance of Peace Services, published by Life and Peace Institute, Uppsala, Sweden, 1994 (co-funded by SIDA and Swedish Ministry of Foreign Affairs). (one of several contributors).
- Seeds of Peace, Harvest for Life by Sr. Mary Evelyn Jegen, SND (Abbey Press, St. Meinrad, Indiana, US, 1994). O'Donnell's contributions quoted and acknowledged in Chapters 2 and 13.
- Keeping the Peace: Exploring civilian alternatives in conflict prevention (132 pages), by Lisa Schirch, published by Life & Peace Institute, Uppsala, Sweden, October 1995 (ISBN 91-87748-26-6).
- Challenges and Opportunities Abroad – The White Paper on Foreign Policy (348 pages), published by the Government of Ireland (Department of Foreign Affairs) in April 1996 (ISBN 0-7076-2385-5). His contribution acknowledged in list of contributors.
- Volunteers Against Conflict (ISBN 92-808-0923-7), published in 1996 by United Nations University and United Nations Volunteers, a collaborative effort with the Humanitarianism and War Project of the Thomas J. Watson Jr. Institute for International Studies, Brown University (US). The book includes firsthand accounts of UN volunteers deployed by O'Donnell in Cambodia, South Africa, Mozambique, Rwanda, ex-Yugoslavia, and Somalia. Presidents Mary Robinson (Ireland), Nelson Mandela (South Africa), and Jimmy Carter (US), all endorsed the book. Book project initiated by O'Donnell.
- Patterns of Partnership: UN Peacekeeping and Peoples' Peacebuilding by Tatsuro Kunugi, Elise Boulding, & Jan Oberg, published by The Transnational Foundation for Peace and Future Research, Sweden, 1996. O'Donnell's work cited.
- Governance Foundations in Post-Conflict Situations, by Rajeev Pillay, published by UNDP, New York, November 1999 Acknowledgements: Governance Foundations for Post-Conflict Situations: UNDP's Experience, November 1999
- Promoting Conflict Prevention and Conflict Resolution through Effective Governance: A Conceptual Survey and Literature Review, by Randolph Kent, published by UNDP, New York, 1999 PROMOTING CONFLICT PREVENTION AND
- Transition in Governance: The UNDP Framework and How It Is Being Made Operational, UNDP, New York, June 2000; extract published online by USAID, Washington DC, 2000 USAID Conflict Prevention Workshop Notes
- Irishman heads UN programme in Belgrade, by Deaglán de Bréadún, Irish Times, Dublin, 13 October 2000.
- You need a Vision! H.E. Francis M. O'Donnell, Resident Coordinator of the United Nations in Serbia & Montenegro, interview in CorD Magazine, Issue no. 2 (pp. 44–46), published by CMA (Consulting & Marketing Agency), Belgrade, February 2004 (ISSN 1451-7833).
- Housing in South Eastern Europe - solving a puzzle of challenges; Sector note following up the Ministerial Housing Conference for South Eastern Europe (Paris, 23–24 April 2003) within the framework of the Stability Pact for South Eastern Europe, published by the Council of Europe Development Bank and the World Bank, Paris, March 2004
- Millennium Development Goals and the Poverty Eradication Strategy in Serbia - The Thirteenth Meetings of NGOs & UNDP, published by The Chancellery of H.R.H Crown Prince Alexander II of Yugoslavia, Royal Palace, Belgrade, September 2004
- The United Nations Development Programme – A Better Way? (372 pages), by Craig N. Murphy, published by Cambridge University Press, New York/US & Cambridge/UK, 2006 (ISBN 0-521-68316-5). O'Donnell's work and influence in East Timor in early 2000, cited (page 341).
- Cultural Diplomacy in the Service of Serbia, by Dr. Vjera Mujović, published by the Institute for Political Studies Belgrade, 2020 (367pp) (ISBN 978-86-7419-323-5) (her doctoral dissertation of May 2019 at the Faculty of Media and Communications, Singidunum University, Belgrade, Serbia). (Др Вјера Мујовић, Културна дипломатија у служби Србије, Издавач: Институт за политичке студије Београд, Београд, 2020).

== Honours ==
=== State awards ===
- Slovakia: Ambassador O'Donnell was awarded the Golden Medal by Miroslav Lajčák, deputy prime minister and Minister of Foreign and European Affairs of the Slovak Republic on 1 March 2013, in recognition of enhanced bilateral relations with the Sovereign Military Order of Malta during the period 2009–2013, and expanded activities in social work, palliative care, disability and health, and a new programme for the integration of Roma children into the education system.
- Ukraine:Ombudsman's Medal of Honour
- Holy See: O'Donnell holds the Cross of Honour of Jerusalem, bestowed on him by the Custodia Franciscalis Terra Sanctae in 1965.

=== Orders ===
- Sovereign Military Order of Malta: Grand Cross of the Order pro merito Melitensi, conferred by the Prince and Grand Master of the Sovereign Military Order of Malta, Fra' Matthew Festing, on 26 July 2014 in Dublin, pursuant to diploma of 9 October 2013; and conferred in parallel with visit of grand master to Dublin in August 2014.
- Sovereign Military Order of Malta: O'Donnell is also a Knight of Malta (member of the Sovereign Military and Hospitaller Order of Saint John of Jerusalem, of Rhodes, and of Malta), and was accredited, as the Order's ambassador extraordinary and plenipotentiary to the Slovak Republic (2009–2013).
- Holy See: He was decreed into the Pontifical Equestrian Order of St. Gregory the Great, by decree 1566/ON of 10 November 2007, by virtue of which Pope Benedict XVI conferred on him the dignity of papal Knight Commander with Silver Star, a dignity assumed upon his retirement from the UN.
- Holy See: He was invested into the Equestrian Order of the Holy Sepulchre of Jerusalem, Irish Lieutenancy, by the Latin Patriarch of Jerusalem, at St Patrick's College, Maynooth, Ireland on 22–23 July 2011.

=== Dynastic orders ===
- House of Bourbon-Two Sicilies: He is also a Knight Commander of the Sacred Military Constantinian Order of Saint George, which shares motto: In Hoc Signo Vinces, inscribed on his coat of arms the main motif of which is a cross-crosslet.
- (Georgia (country)) Royal House of Georgia: He was made Grand Cross in the Royal Order of the Eagle of Georgia by Crown Prince David Bagration of Mukhrani, per diploma dated 30 July 2014, and invested in Leixlip Castle.

== Fellow ==
O'Donnell was elected Fellow of the Genealogical Society of Ireland (FGSI) on 1 December 2022, as announced in its Gazette. He was elected Fellow of the World Academy of Art and Science in July 2025

== Arms ==
- Ireland: heraldic achievement: The typical O'Donnell "supporters" of a bull and lion rampant, in azure and gold respectively, consistent with historic O'Donnell arms and suitably differentiated therefrom, were added by the Chief Herald of Ireland (Vol. Aa, Folio 72) to his arms recorded in the Register of Grants and Confirmations (Volume Z, folio 87)
