= Fobes-O'Donnell House =

Historic house in Massachusetts, United States

- U.S. National Register of Historic Places
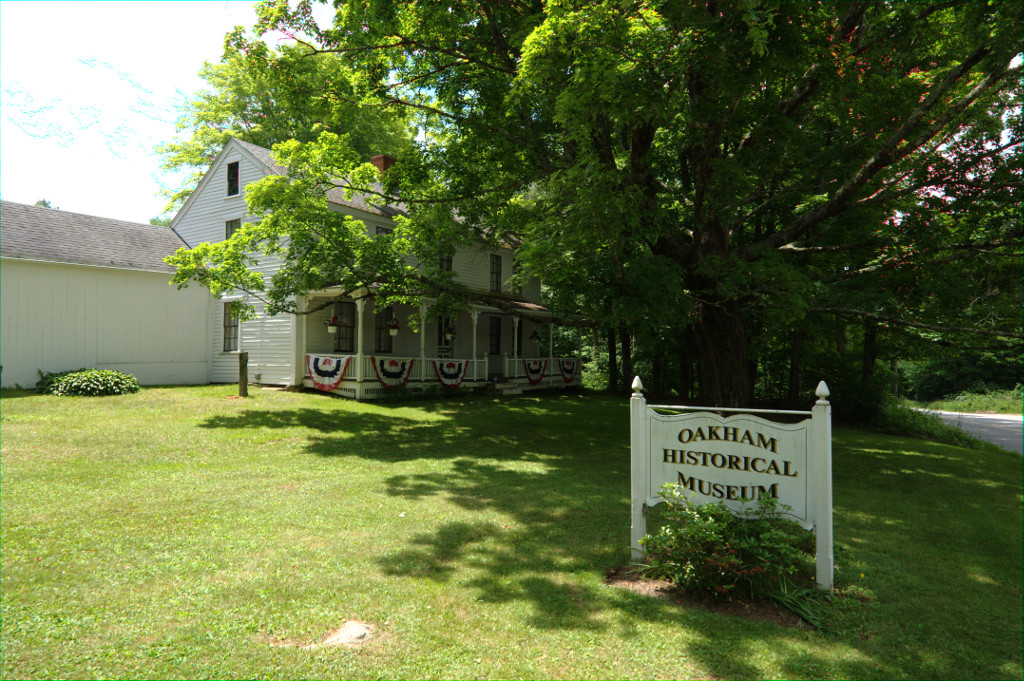

- Location within Massachusetts Location within the United States
- Location: 1221 Old Turnpike Rd., Oakham, Massachusetts
- Coordinates: 42°22′3″N 72°4′8″W
- Area: 1 acre (0.40 ha)
- Built: c. 1773
- Architectural style: Georgian
- NRHP reference No.: 100002197
- Added to NRHP: March 7, 2018

The Fobes-O'Donnell House is a historic house museum at 1221 Old Turnpike Road in Oakham, Massachusetts. Probably built in the second half of the 18th century, it served as a tavern on what was then a major through road, and housed the town's first post office. It is now operated as a museum by the local historical society. The house was listed on the National Register of Historic Places in 2018.

== Description and history ==
The Fobes-O'Donnell House is located in what is now a rural setting of northern Oakham, on the south side of the junction of Old Turnpike Road and Hunt Road. It is a 2 1/2-story wood-frame structure, with a side-gable roof, central chimney, and clapboarded exterior. The main facade is five bays wide, with symmetrically placed windows around the center entrance, A single-story porch extends across the front, with late 19th-century Victorian bracketing and slender columns. The interior follows a typical central chimney plan, with a narrow entrance vestibule, kitchen to the left, and parlor to the right. A single-story ell extends to the left side. The house stands on 1 acre (0.40 ha) of land, substantially reduced from more than the 100 acres it was historically associated with.

The exact construction date of the house is unknown, but appears from stylistic evidence to date from the second half of the 18th century. It was probably built by John Murray, a wealthy landowner from nearby Rutland. Murray held Loyalist sympathies during the period of the American Revolution, eventually fled to Canada. His property was seized by the state, and was acquired by Joseph Fobes in 1799. Fobes operated a tavern on the premises, serving travelers on the turnpike, which was a major route between Boston and Hadley. In 1813, he became Oakham's first postmaster, operating the post office out of this building. The building was sold out of the Fobes family to the O'Donnells in 1894. Members of both of these families were active in local civic affairs, serving in town offices. The house was given to the Oakham Historical Society in 1994 by the O'Donnells.

== See also ==
- National Register of Historic Places listings in Worcester County, Massachusetts
