= O'Donnell Middle School =

O'Donnell Middle School may refer to:

- O'Donnell Middle School, Houston, Texas - Alief Independent School District
- Dr. Robert G. O'Donnell Middle School, Stoughton, Massachusetts - Stoughton Public Schools
