= Conor O'Donnell =

Conor O'Donnell may refer to:

- Conor O'Donnell (Carndonagh footballer), Donegal Gaelic footballer
- Conor O'Donnell (St Eunan's footballer), Donegal Gaelic footballer
