= Thomas Wyndham, 1st Baron Wyndham =

Irish lawyer and politician

The Right Honourable The Lord Wyndham PC
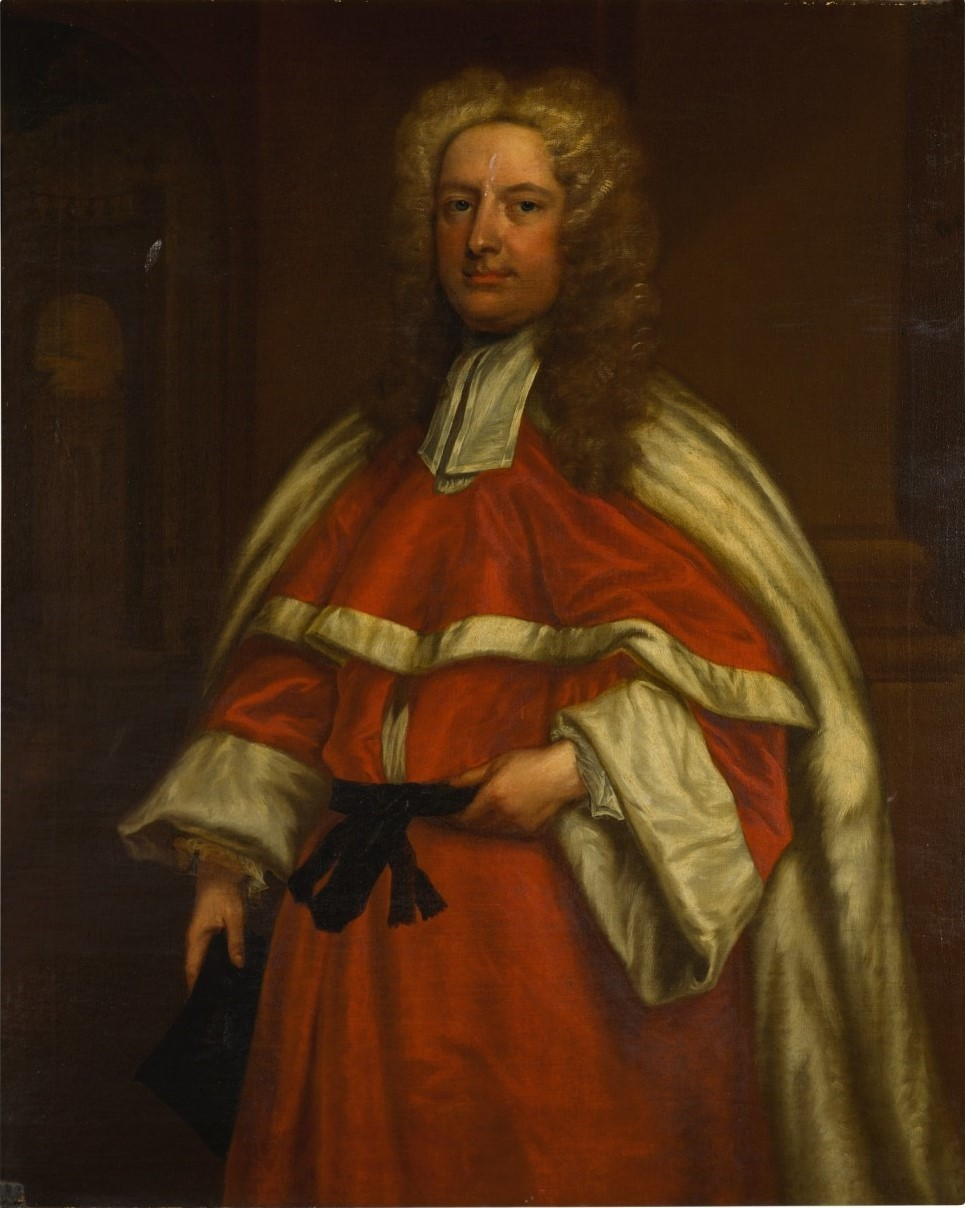

Lord Chancellor of Ireland
- In office 1726–1739
- Monarchs: George I George II
- Preceded by: Richard West
- Succeeded by: The Viscount Jocelyn

Personal details
- Born: 27 December 1681
- Died: 14 November 1745 (aged 63) Wiltshire, England
- Education: Wadham College, Oxford

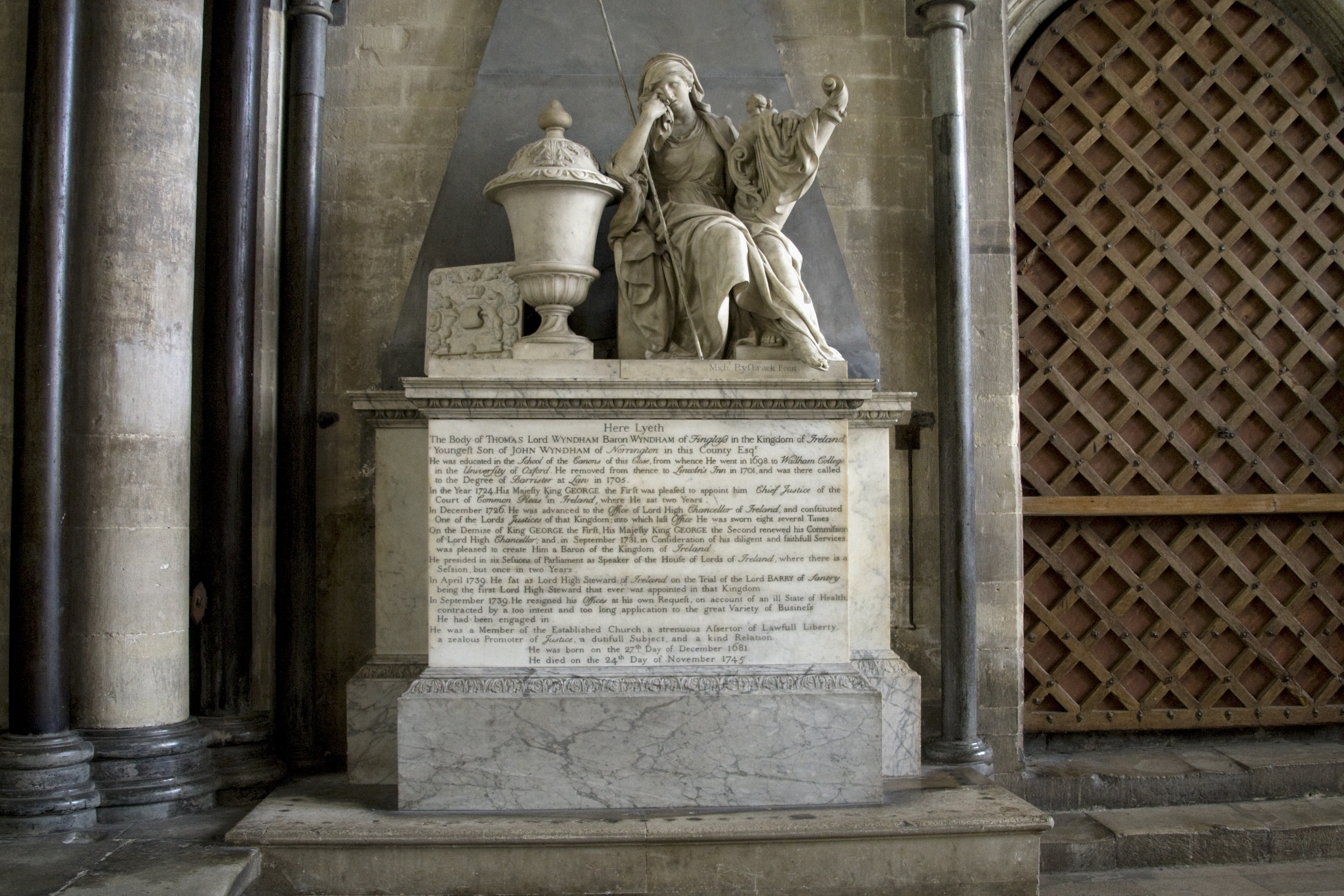
Monument in Salisbury Cathedral to Thomas Wyndham, 1st Baron Wyndham

Thomas Wyndham, 1st Baron Wyndham PC (27 December 1681 – 24 November 1745), was an Irish lawyer and politician. He served as Lord Chancellor of Ireland from 1726 to 1739.

== Background ==
Wyndham was born in Wiltshire, the son of Colonel John Wyndham and his wife Alice Fownes. His grandfather was the distinguished Restoration judge Sir Wadham Wyndham. He was educated at Salisbury Cathedral School and Wadham College, Oxford, and was called to the Bar from Lincoln's Inn.

== Career ==
Wyndham served as Chief Justice of the Irish Common Pleas from 1724 to 1726 and was sworn of the Irish Privy Council in 1724. In 1726 he was appointed Lord Chancellor of Ireland, a post he held until 1739. In 1731 he was raised to the Peerage of Ireland as Baron Wyndham, of Finglass in the County of Dublin.

He presided as Lord High Steward of Ireland at the trial of Lord Santry for the murder of Laughlin Murphy in 1739; the verdict was guilty and Wyndham had the distinction of being the only Irish judge to sentence an Irish peer to death for murder (although Santry was ultimately pardoned). His conduct of the trial, as was to be expected of a judge with his reputation for integrity, was exemplary, although the prosecution case was so strong that the outcome cannot have been seriously in doubt.

Shortly afterwards he was allowed to retire on account of ill health; by his own account, the strain of the Santry trial had taken a great toll on him. He was only 58, and despite his failing health his retirement seems to have come as a surprise to his colleagues.

== Personal life ==
Wyndham never married. He died in Wiltshire on 24 November 1745, aged 63, and was buried in Salisbury Cathedral. The barony died with him. He was awarded the Freedom of the City of Dublin, and received an honorary degree from Trinity College Dublin. In 1729 he laid the foundation stone for the new Irish Houses of Parliament.

== Character ==
Elrington Ball praises him warmly as "a great gentleman", and one of the most distinguished members of an eminent family. As a statesman he was prudent and conciliating; as a judge, he was noted for efficiency, integrity and impartiality. His devotion to duty, which may have contributed to the collapse of his health, is shown by his willingness to hear urgent cases at home, even during the legal vacation.

Legal offices
Preceded by Sir Richard Levinge, 1st Baronet	Chief Justice of the Irish Common Pleas; 1724–1726	Succeeded by William Whitshed
Political offices
Preceded by Richard West	Lord Chancellor of Ireland; 1726–1739	Succeeded by The Viscount Jocelyn
Peerage of Ireland
New creation	Baron Wyndham; 1731–1745	Extinct
