= Mona Tyndall =

Irish physician and Roman Catholic missionary

Mona Tyndall (14 April 1921 – 7 June 2000) was an Irish medical doctor and Roman Catholic missionary in Nigeria and Zambia. As a member of the Roman Catholic religious congregation of the Missionary Sisters of the Holy Rosary (MSHR), she was a missionary in Nigeria and Zambia. She was a development worker in the early fight against HIV/AIDS through her leadership of Mother & Child Clinics which were supported by the Irish Government's overseas aid programme in Zambia.

== Early life and education ==
Born in 1921, Mona (Mary Monica) Tyndall was one of the six children of businessman David P. Tyndall and his wife, Sarah Gaynor Tyndall. She was raised in County Dublin.

Mona Tyndall joined the Holy Rosary Sisters in Killeshandra, County Cavan, in 1940, making her religious profession on 28 August 1942.

She later qualified as a medical doctor at University College Dublin and went to England where she qualified as an obstetrician and gynaecologist. She was admitted as a Fellow to the Royal College of Obstetricians and Gynaecologists on 6 June 1984.

== Missionary life ==
=== Nigeria and the Biafran War ===
Tyndall began her missionary life in Africa starting in Nigeria in 1949 where she ministered to the sick and particularly to young mothers. She was involved, along with her fellow religious, in caring for the wounded and displaced during the Biafran War which broke out in Nigeria in 1967. Mission hospitals and feeding centers were overwhelmed by sick and wounded civilians and soldiers, and she worked to save lives and console homeless orphans. At the time, she was medical superintendent of the Holy Rosary Hospital in Emekuku. As she stated to Liam Ryan of the Evening Herald, given the chance to leave at the outbreak of war, she and ten other Irish nuns of the Holy Rosary Order, decided to stay. She confirmed press reports of "thousands who are dying daily of starvation and disease" with the hospital overrun by starving refugees and war-wounded. She and others cared for the starving and the dying, and she appealed for foreign aid to stem the daily toll. Federal Nigerian troops later took possession of all the mission stations. While Tyndall and her fellow sisters and priests remained at their posts as long as they could, they were ultimately arrested and imprisoned, along with their Bishop, J. Whelan, CSSp. They were reportedly released only through the personal intercession of Pope Paul VI and then deported from Nigeria.

=== Zambia ===
The remainder of her missionary life was spent in Zambia, where she worked firstly in Monze Mission Hospital, and later in Lusaka University Teaching Hospital (UTH), after a brief year in the Westminster Pastoral Institute in London. As consultant obstetrician/gynaecologist at Lusaka UTH, she became a national tutor in the sympto-thermal method of family planning. Concerned with hospital overcrowding and high post-natal mortality, she strove to reduce maternal mortality by half in the 1990s, in accordance with the "Health for All" Alma Ata Declaration (1978). In this, she was supported by the Government of Zambia, and attracted funding from Ireland's then-emerging Official Development Assistance. She inspired the Suburban Maternity Clinics project, following her invitation in 1982 to Donal Denham, Ireland's first diplomat to serve in Zambia, to visit the UTH, where he found "women giving birth out in the corridors on emergency trollies, some 25,000 of them in 1981". Denham committed to help de-centralise the maternity infrastructure, through training of midwives and the re-conditioning of a fleet of Land Rovers as ambulances with radio receivers. The network was up and running within a year and overcrowding at UTH was substantially reduced. The project was subsequently expanded throughout the country. Mona Tyndall was credited with the primary role in setting up this network of rural clinics with trained local personnel, which dispensed natural family planning methods, and eventually raised awareness about the dangers of HIV/AIDS.

== Later life and death ==
Tyndall retired from missionary service and returned to Cavan in 1995, where she became involved with the "Cavan Bereavement Group", for which she trained as a counselor and supervisor. She was a contributor to Ireland's first White Paper on foreign policy, and is included in the list of public contributors whose submissions were acknowledged in the paper. She died on Wednesday 7 June 2000 at College View Nursing Home in Cavan.
