= Denis O'Donnell =

Irish entrepreneur

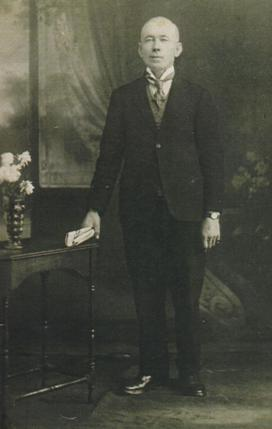
Denis O'Donnell, founder of the Lee Strand Creamery

Denis O'Donnell (28 May 1875 – 16 June 1933) was an entrepreneur in County Kerry, Ireland, in the early 1900s. He was the organiser, co-founder and first manager of the Lee Strand Cooperative Creamery.

== Background ==
He was born in Tubrid, Ardfert, County Kerry, to Patrick O'Donnell of Tubridmore, and Bridget (née Griffin) of Lerrig. He was a grandson of John O'Donnell of Ardfert, who lived at Tubridmore, and descended from O'Donnells of Tyrconnell, following on the implantation of O'Donnells in Ardfert by Prince Hugh Roe O'Donnell en route to the Battle of Kinsale in 1601, as recorded in the Annals of the Kingdom of Ireland. He wrote poetry as a hobby. He initially farmed a family farm at Tubrid until he left to Ballyhaise, an agricultural college.

He married Hannah Leane, from Ballintobeenig, and they had one child, Patrick Denis O'Donnell. He died following an accident when his son Patrick was only 11 years old, and his widow, Hannah, subsequently emigrated to the United States of America at the outbreak of World War II, when their son, Patrick, joined the Irish Defence Forces.

== Education ==
Denis O'Donnell was schooled in Tubrid, in Spa, and later in Chapeltown national schools, and then farmed some years before proceeding to study and become one of the first graduates of Ballyhaise College, County Cavan, Ireland, with a Diploma in Dairy Science, having studied there from 1908 to 1910. This was the only such qualification available in the country at the time.

== Business career ==
In his early career, he was a manager in some small creameries, one in County Tipperary, and others in Black Abbey, Adare, County Limerick; in Dicksgrove, Farranfore, and BallymcElligott, and Ballydwyer in County Kerry. He was influenced by the cooperative movement being driven by Sir Horace Plunkett, as described in the account of country life of the times by Elizabeth, Countess of Fingall, Seventy Years Young. Plunkett was the father of the Irish agricultural co-operative movement, and founded the Irish Agricultural Organisation Society (now the Irish Co-operative Organisation Society), which included several hundred creameries. Accordingly, Denis O'Donnell organised farmers in the early cooperative movement in County Kerry, and founded the Lee Strand Co-operative Creamery on 30 April 1920 in Church Street, Tralee, still a going concern marking its centenary in 2020 although it relocated to Ballymullen in 1992 to the site of the former barracks of the Royal Munster Fusiliers. He owned a pub at #2 Edward Street, Tralee, run by his sister Bride, until her emigration to Kimberly, South Africa. The pub was sold in 1938. He also owned shops in Rock Street and Castle Street in Tralee. He was the first to introduce the pasteurisation of milk, much against the prejudice of dairy farmers at the time, and also was the first to market ice cream in Tralee.

Within a few years of its establishment, the Lee Strand Creamery already won both first and second prize for creamery butter at the Listowel Show in 1924, followed by a signal success at the Cork Show, winning first, second, and third prizes in various classes, out of competition with 22 others, for which the Kerryman newspaper congratulated Denis O’Donnell, as manager, and his team.

On Friday 9 October 1925, a fire occurred at the Lee Strand Creamery, which "caused serious damage to the machinery and plant". While the creamery's engine shed was heavily damaged, the main building was saved. O'Donnell thanked the firemen and voluntary helpers for their services. The engine room's suction gas plant, refrigerator, boiler and steam engine were all heavily damaged and rendered useless. As a result, the creamery could not function for a period, and no milk could be received from suppliers. The fire was believed to have been accidental and caused by a spark that set fire to the roof of the engine shed.

== Socio-economic aspects ==
O'Donnell engaged in extensive correspondence in the 1920s about the management of creameries, including the ability of some to keep butter supplies in cold storage pending better market prices. However, some without such cold storage ran the risk of over-holding supplies until they went rancid and unfit for sale. Others considered such practices to be tantamount to market manipulation, and at odds with the interests of producers and consumers. He pleaded for improved quality, and the new Dairy Produce Act aimed to standardize and improve the quality of Irish butter. Already in those times, the competition between Danish butter and Irish butter in various British markets was marked in price and quality, and O'Donnell tried to assure farmers that "Englishmen and Scotchmen prize our butter highly and pay good prices for it".

Denis O’Donnell was a supporter of the Gaelic Athletic Association (GAA). In Croke Park on 22 September 1929, the Kerry senior GAA football team beat Kildare and became All-Ireland Champions. Denis O’Donnell supported plans for a victory banquet and was quoted "I hope the banquet will be worthy and fitting for those splendid men who triumphed on the football field. It is not on those fields alone our Kerry people win".

== Political views ==
O'Donnell was a frequent correspondent of the Kerryman and would later write letters to other national papers on a variety of topics. When the prospect came in 1925 of a visit to Tralee by the controversial County Cork-born Archbishop Daniel Mannix of Melbourne, who had opposed the Easter Rising of 1916, but also opposed conscription, Denis O’Donnell wrote initially on 10 October to query his intentions, as Mannix's preceding visits to other parts of Ireland were "preaching politics everywhere, naming some Irishmen Imperialists, and blowing his own trumpet as to his steadfastness in our cause". By pointing out the inconsistencies if not contradictions in Dr. Mannix's public postures, O’Donnell was taking on a "sacred cow" – he was ahead of his time in not submitting blindly to the dominance of clergy acting as political agents provocateurs, and in emphasizing the onus on that particular cleric to speak instead towards national unity rather than foster radicalism in the name of Irish republicanism. It wasn't the first time that one of his lineage took a more inclusive realpolitik rather than an ideological approach to national independence and the struggle for effective sovereignty. But this flew against the grain of the popular media and public sentiment of the time, and so he had to offer his "second thoughts" letter of 12 October.

In that nuanced regard, Denis O’Donnell welcomed Mannix's planned encounters in Ireland as "a real peace demonstration" if people "of all shades of opinion" took part in it. He added that if Mannix were "to foster or sanction disunion, such would be most objectionable", but "his influence for good and for uniting all Irishmen will be, if anything, more powerful, and Dr. Mannix will have endeavoured to do what I hoped was his object when I first learned he would visit our country". This should have placated another anonymous begrudging correspondent self-described as "a lane dweller", who writing two days beforehand libelled O’Donnell as "the Dictator of Basin View" where he lived, for simply querying the expectations of the Kerry County Council in inviting Dr. Mannix. It is clear that Denis O’Donnell had a more nuanced understanding of the background of Dr. Mannix, who in earlier times had demonstrated loyalty to Kings Edward VII in 1905 and George V in 1911, and not been that supportive of Home rule, but who years later became more ardently nationalist especially after he had been intercepted and arrested by British troops who boarded his vessel in 1920 while sailing from New York destined for Ireland, but then transferred to England to prevent his influence in Ireland. Mannix later became a life-long friend of Éamon de Valera.

== Court appearances ==
During a court case where a creamery claimed damages from a defendant, O'Donnell elicited laughter when he described the process of negotiation for a settlement of the dispute, by saying that during the negotiations between the defendant and the creamery managers "there was so much peace during all the deliberations that the words 'good graces' must have slipped in!"

He was himself taken to court on one occasion for alleged arrears in payment of income tax of £4-16s, however, the case was dismissed as the arrears pertained to the previous occupant of his house in Basin View, Tralee, and not to himself.

== Related references ==
- The O’Donnells of Tyrconnell – A Hidden Legacy, by Francis Martin O'Donnell, published by Academica Press LLC in London and Washington, D.C., 2018, (750 pages) (ISBN 978-1-680534740) (contains detailed genealogy of the O'Donnells of Ardfert).
- Early records of the Lee Strand Co-operative Creamery including documents signed by Denis O'Donnell, e.g. such as relating to a special general meeting on 5 July 1926 (Family Archive of the O'Donnells of Ardfert).
- Annals of the Kingdom of Ireland (Annála Ríoghachta Éireann) by the Four Masters, from the earliest period to the year 1616, compiled during the period 1632-1636 by Brother Michael O’Clery, translated and edited by John O'Donovan in 1856, and re-published in 1998 by De Burca, Dublin.
- The Life of Hugh Roe O'Donnell, Prince of Tyrconnell (Beatha Aodh Ruadh O Domhnaill) by Lughaidh O'Cleirigh. Edited by Paul Walsh and Colm Ó Lochlainn. Irish Texts Society, vol. 42. Dublin: Educational Company of Ireland, 1948 (original Gaelic manuscript in the Royal Irish Academy in Dublin).
- A Political Odyssey - Thomas O'Donnell, M.P. for West Kerry, by J. Anthony Gaughan, Kingdom Books, Dublin, 1983 ISBN 0-9506015-4-3. Gaughan is Chairman of the National Library Society of Ireland.
- Seventy Years Young, Memoires of Elizabeth, Countess of Fingall, by Elizabeth Burke-Plunkett, Lady Fingall. First published by Collins of London in 1937; 1991 edition published by The Lilliput Press, Dublin 7, Ireland ISBN 0-946640-74-2. This Elizabeth, was a Burke from Moycullen in County Galway, who married the 11th Earl of Fingall, and should not be confused with Elizabeth Plunket (née FitzGerald), Baroness Killeen, first wife of Luke Plunket, the later 1st Earl of Fingall (1604–1611).
