= David P. Tyndall =

David P. Tyndall (17 May 1890 — 6 January 1970) was an Irish businessman in the 20th century, and played a major role in helping modernise the wholesale and retail grocery trade, consolidate it, and enable the family grocery shop owner adapt to the advent of supermarkets.

== Family background ==
The grandson of John Tyndall from Newcastle, County Dublin, a saddlery and forge owner, he was also descended from an O'Donnell of Tyrconnell, through a great-grandmother from Glenties, County Donegal. A native of Chapelizod, he left school at the age of 14 to work and in due time become an entrepreneur. He married Sarah Gaynor (1 January 1892 – 19 August 1978) from Inchicore in Dublin, in 1914, and had six children, William, David, Jr. ("Dave"), Annie, Mona, John, and Stephanie. They settled in Glasnevin.

William and Dave joined their father's business when they reached the age of 16. Annie died in 1934, a young woman. Mona joined the Holy Rosary Sisters and became a medical doctor and missionary in Africa. John became a Dublin psychiatrist. Stephanie married an army officer, Patrick Denis O'Donnell.

== Career in business ==
In 1931, David P. Tyndall decided to start his own business, having been a wholesale butter merchant for some years. With a partner, they founded Doherty, Tyndall & Co. Ltd., distributing groceries by horse and two-wheeled cart. By 1941, the firm had expanded to thirteen employees, including his two older sons, Willie and Davy. Transport switched from horse to motor. In 1943, the company became wholly owned as D. Tyndall & Sons, Ltd. Another company was founded and added in 1957, Farm Sales Ltd.

In the years that followed, other companies were taken over, and the business diversified and expanded, in tandem with technological innovations, commercial and marketing initiatives. Modern business methods were developed, such as "cash and carry" wholesaling in 1964, and incentive schemes for workers were introduced. Upon Tyndall's retirement, his company had one of the largest networks in the country.

== Private sector influence ==
With time, he and his sons realised the benefits of consolidation in the sector, and founded a business association of retailers, RG Data (Retail Grocery, Dairy and Allied Trades), which became a business lobby. Politicians such as Taoisigh (Irish Prime Ministers) Éamon de Valera, Liam Cosgrave, and Jack Lynch supported business initiatives by David P. Tyndall and his sons.

In 1963, he introduced the Dutch-based supermarket chain, SPAR, into Ireland.

== Personal life ==
Tyndall held a lifelong interest in horse-racing, and at one time owned a number of racehorses. A devout Roman Catholic, he was also a benefactor to the Catholic Church and various charities.

== Tributes ==
Former Taoiseach (Prime Minister), Liam Cosgrave, and other leaders of the political, business, and community sectors attended David P. Tyndall's funeral in 1970. He is buried in Glasnevin Cemetery.

== Companies founded ==
- Doherty, Tyndall & Co. Ltd.
- D. Tyndall & Sons, Ltd.
- Farm Sales, Ltd.
- Creamery packers, Ltd.
- Efficient Distribution, Ltd. (Golden Goose Stores)
- SPAR Ireland Ltd.
- Cameron Markets, Ltd.
- Park Markets, Ltd.
- Greenhills Produce, Ltd.
- Phoenix Markets, Ltd.
