= Thomas E. O'Donnell (draft opponent) =

Newspaper picture of Thomas E. O'Donnell.

Thomas E. O'Donnell (c. 1841 – c. 1875) was one of the driving forces in the New York City draft riots, when he was 22 years old. He was a public opponent of the draft, so he was promptly arrested. Though his jail time is unknown, it is known that he died at age 34 due to heart problems.

He is best represented in The Devil's Own Work: The Civil War Draft Riots and the Fight to Reconstruct America.
