= Patrick Denis O'Donnell =

Patrick Denis O'Donnell (9 January 1922 – 1 January 2005) was an Irish military historian, writer, former UN peace-keeper, and Commandant of the Irish Defence Forces.

Patrick D. O'Donnell at 83 years

== Background ==
He was born in the Kerries Tralee, County Kerry, only child of Denis O'Donnell, and Hannah Leane, and was also known as "Paddy" or "P.D.". He was a direct descendant of John O'Donnell of Ardfert, and descended from an O'Donnell of Tyrconnell, following on the implantation of O'Donnells in Ardfert by Prince Hugh Roe O'Donnell en route to the Battle of Kinsale in 1601, as recorded in the Annals of the Kingdom of Ireland. He married Stephanie Sarah Teresa Tyndall in 1952, daughter of David P. Tyndall and Sarah née Gaynor, and they lived in Fingal, north Dublin. They had three children, Frank (see Francis Martin O'Donnell), Sally, and Nola. He was a cousin of Maurice Gerard Moynihan, with shared interests in historical matters.

== Education ==
He was educated in Tralee Christian Brothers Schools and joined the Irish Army in 1940. He successfully completed management and psychology courses at the School of Management at Rathmines Technical School. He graduated from the Irish Military College in the Curragh, and was commissioned in 1943. He also graduated from the Infantry School on 13 April 1949, with distinction. Later he attended the Public Relations Institute of Ireland in the early 1960s, and conducted public relations campaigns for the visit of US President John F. Kennedy to Ireland in 1962

== Military career ==
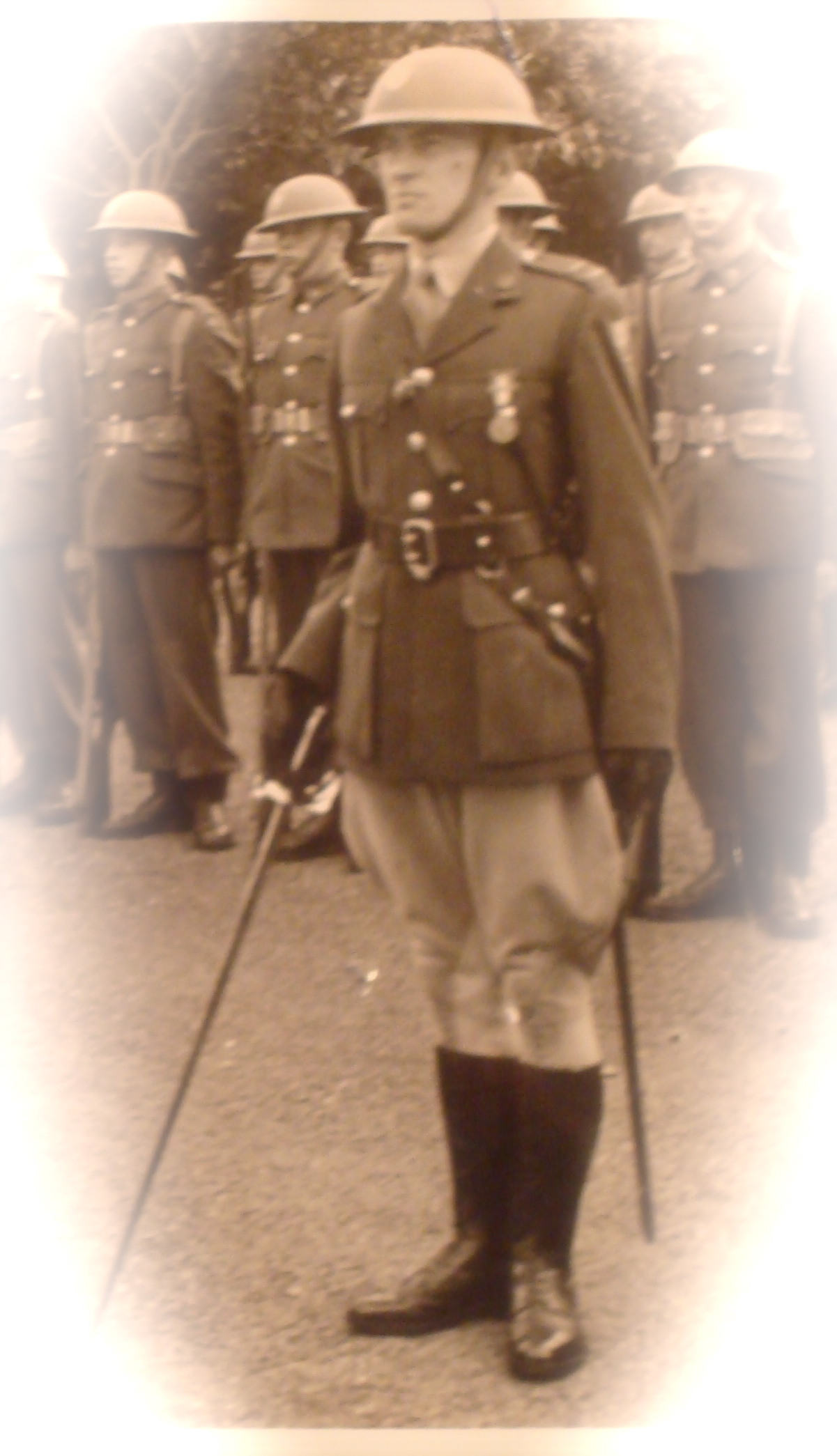
O'Donnell in Honour Guard when Lieutenant, 1950s

He served during the "Emergency" as the period of the Second World War was known in then-neutral Ireland. He served briefly, with commendation, as a United Nations Military Observer with the United Nations Truce Supervision Organisation for Palestine (UNTSO), during the years 1965–1967, successively in Jerusalem, Tiberias, and Damascus.

Later, he held senior responsibilities in the Observer Corps (the Irish Army's unit for mitigation and preparedness in the event of nuclear war), military intelligence, and border security. An amateur artist in his spare time, he designed the insignia of the 5th Infantry Battalion. He rose to the rank of Commandant (Major) before retirement. He was awarded the United Nations Medal by the United Nations Secretary-General on 30 November 1965, and the United Nations Peacekeepers Medal by the Irish Government in 1991, in recognition of his service in the cause of world peace.

== Historical interests ==
Patrick D. O'Donnell (right) greeting young Count Hugo O'Donnell (now Duke of Tetuan) of Lucena, Spain, in Dublin in 1963

He was keenly interested in Irish and Middle Eastern history and was a member of the O'Donnell Clan Association. He was very active in O'Donnell Clan research for many decades, and at one time represented the Irish Defence Forces and the Military History Society in these matters. He frequently corresponded also with the Spanish and Austrian members of the clan of the O'Donnells of Tyrconnell. Of note, he also wrote a published series on the history of military barracks in Ireland, and lectured at the Old Dublin Society. He also researched Theobald Wolfe Tone's death, discovered his tomb, and published several articles on evidence that it was an assassination rather than suicide.

In 1980, he also published the first Map of the War of Independence, showing ambushes, raids, burnings and other incidents in the early 1920s. He wrote several series on topics of American military history. Some of his written material on military technology has been used for instructional purposes at the US Armed Forces Staff College in Norfolk, Virginia. In December 1994, he presented his military memorabilia and artefacts to the National Museum of Ireland. (Evening Press, 20 December 1994)

He also wrote on Irish non-military history including legends of famous castles such as Castlemartin and Ballyheigue, where a tale of a ghostly appearance was picked up later by the American expert on the paranormal, Hans Holzer, in his book The Lively Ghosts of Ireland. He was best known abroad for his book The Irish Faction Fighters of the 19th Century, (published by Anvil Books, Dublin, 1975), a sociological analysis of rural inter-clan feuding, and its exploitation as a form of control to contain rising agrarian agitation in the 19th century in Ireland.

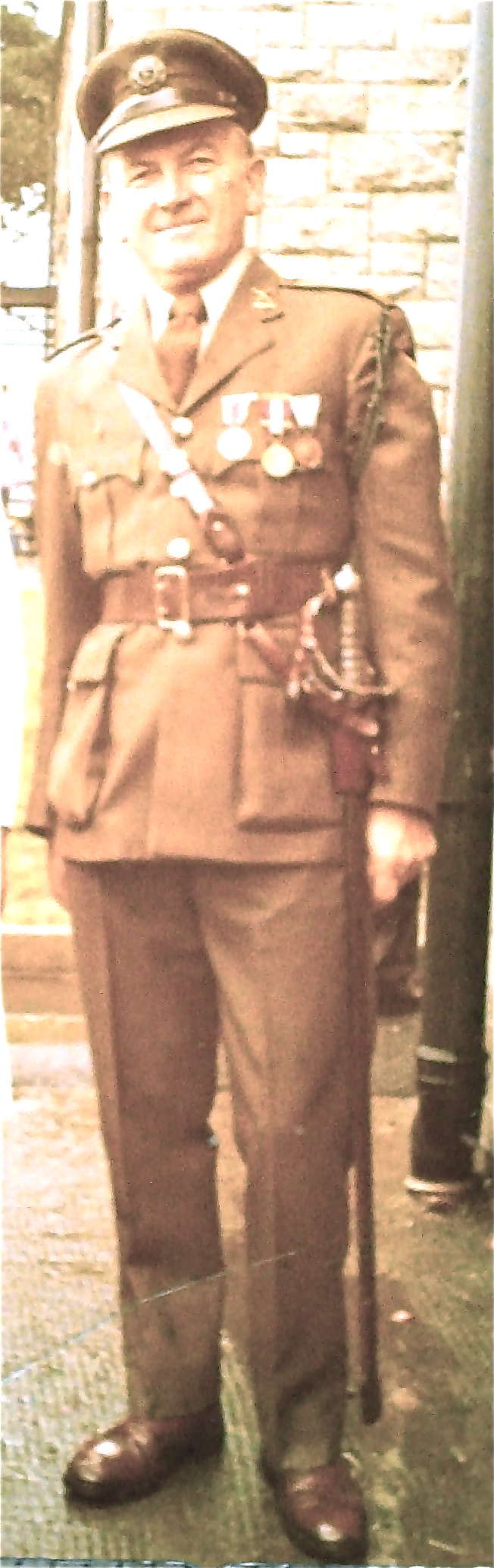
Comdt. P.D. O'Donnell during Papal Visit to Ireland, Dublin, 1979

He was frequently consulted as an authority on various historical matters, and was often cited at home and abroad in other works. He wrote over 1,000 articles and was a frequent contributor to leading Irish newspapers and periodicals, including An Cosantóir, the journal of the Irish Army, and The Irish Sword, the journal of the Irish Military History Society. He was a member of many associations (PEN/writers, Public Relations Institute of Ireland, the US President John F. Kennedy Association). He also held the position of Hereditary Lord Steward for Tyrconnell, with prerogatives as deputy to the Lord High Steward of Ireland (Great Seneschal of Ireland) and also succeeded to an Irish territorial barony, Fingal originally dating back to a grant by King John in 1208 and a related manorial lordship, Fyngallestoun. He was also a member of the Knights of St. Columbanus, and of the lay Third Order of the Dominicans, and also received the Silver Cross of Honour of Jerusalem.

== Selected works ==
- Religion in Ireland, pages 17–22, in The Marian, Vol. 19, No. 169, published by the Congregation of Marian Fathers of the Immaculate Conception, Chicago, USA, March 1965.
- Priest with a Palette, pages 19–21, in The Marian, Vol. 19, No. 173-174, published by the Congregation of Marian Fathers, Chicago, USA, July–August 1965.
- Mary Gallagher – Violinist, pages 59–61 in The Marian, Vol. 20, No. 185, published by the Congregation of Marian Fathers, Chicago, USA, July–August, 1966.
- James White – Art Gallery Curator, pages 59–62, in The Marian, Vol. 20, No. 186, published by the Congregation of Marian Fathers, Chicago, USA, September 1966.
- The Fisher Boy of Galilee, pages 51–52 in The Marian, Vol. 21, No. 192, published by the Congregation of Marian Fathers, Chicago, USA, March, 1967.
- Holy Week in the Holy Land, pages 11–16 in The Marian, Vol. 22, No. 214, published by the Congregation of Marian Fathers, Chicago, USA, March, 1969.
- A Visit to Cana, pages 59–64 in The Marian, Vol. 24, No.228, published by the Congregation of Marian Fathers, Chicago, USA, July–August, 1970.
- Our Lady of Palestine, pages 41–44 in Reality (Redemptorist Publication), Vol. 47, No. 8, September 1983.
- Short Histories of Irish Barracks (Collins Barracks, Clancy Barracks, Griffith Barracks, McKee Barracks, Keogh Barracks, Aiken Barracks, Mellowes Barracks), in An Cosantoir (Journal of the Irish Defence Forces), 1969–1973.
- Irish-American Heroes in the US Navy, in Sunday Press series, Dublin, 1971.
- Chaplain Courageous, USS Franklin, in Sunday Press series, Dublin, 1971.
- Ghosts and Haunted Castles, in Sunday Press series, 1972.
- The Barracks and Posts of Ireland – 21:Collins Barracks, Dublin, part 3, pages 48–52 in An Cosantóir, Dublin, February 1973.
- The Barracks and Posts of Ireland – 22:Royal or Collins Barracks, part 4, the eighteenth century, pages 266–276 in An Cosantóir, Dublin, August 1973.
- Pacific Slaughter – Six US Naval Battles, in Sunday Press series, 1973.
- Wolfe Tone's Provost Prison, in The Irish Sword, no. 42, Volume XI, Military History Society of Ireland, Dublin, 1973.
- The Irish Faction Fighters of the 19th Century", published by Anvil Books, Dublin, 1975.
- Dublin's Collins Barracks over the years, in Hollybough, December 1994.
- Songs of the War Years, in An Cosantoir, the Irish Defence Journal, July/August 1995.
- Wolfe Tone: Suicide or Assassination, in Irish Journal of Medical Science, no. 57, Dublin, 1997 (with Dr. T. Gorey)
- Dick Dowling, Tuam Emigrant-Texan Hero, in pages 42–58 of Glimpses of Tuam since the Famine, Old Tuam Society, Tuam, 1997. ISBN 0-9530250-0-4
- Titanic errors revealed, in CQD Titanic, the official journal of the Ulster Titanic Society, Issue no. 17, Belfast, Summer 2001.
- The Thermopylae of Lieutenant Dick Dowling, in The Irish Sword, VOL.XXIII, no.91, Military History Society of Ireland, Dublin, Summer 2002 (pages 68–86)

== Other references ==
- Blood Royal – From the time of Alexander the Great to Queen Elizabeth II, by Charles Mosley, published for Ruvigny Ltd, London, 2002 (Patrick Denis O'Donnell listed as Baron, page v) ISBN 0-9524229-9-9
- Dublin Barracks – A Brief History of Collins Barracks, by Mairéad Dunlevy, National Museum of Ireland, 2002 (largely based on earlier work by Patrick Denis O'Donnell, as acknowledged in Preface, page 4 by Patrick Wallace, Director, and in Acknowledgments, page 7, Bibliography, page 68, and Notes, pages 67–72).
- The Lively Ghosts of Ireland, by Hans Holzer, Wolfe Publishing Ltd., London, 1967, 1968, reprinted 1970. See Chapter on Ballyheigue, page 32, recalling earlier article in 1962 by Patrick Denis O'Donnell in Ireland of the Welcomes.
- Writer recalls his Tralee Youth, biographical interview with Patrick D. O'Donnell, in The Kerryman, Friday, 15 August 1975 (page 6)
- The Story of Ballyheigue, by Bryan MacMahon, published by Oidhreacht, Ballyheigue, County Kerry, May 1994 ISBN 0-9517658-2-5. See Chapter 18, Legends and Tales, and section The Castle Ghost, page 207 which also recounts the article in 1962 by Patrick Denis O'Donnell in Ireland of the Welcomes.
- O’Donnell, Francis Martin (2018), The O’Donnells of Tyrconnell – A Hidden Legacy, Washington, D.C.: Academica Press LLC, ISBN 978-1-680534740

== Tributes ==
Patrick Denis O'Donnell died in Beaumont Hospital, Dublin, after a long illness, and his remains were interred in Glasnevin Cemetery, following a funeral with military honours and a pall-bearer party from the 5th Infantry Battalion, whose insignia he designed, and in the presence of the Chief of Staff, Lt. General James Sreenan, and accompanied by surviving family members, relatives and friends.

- An Appreciation, article on editorial page of The Irish Times, Dublin, 24 January 2005
- Obituary in Le carnet du jour (Deuil) section of Le Figaro newspaper, Paris, 18 March 2005 (as 'baron de Fyngal, sénéschal de Tyrconnell' & 'sous garde d'honneur militaire')
- Obituary, Esteemed military historian and writer in The Kerryman newspaper, Tralee, 13 January 2005
- Obituary, Army officer was military expert, in Kerry Eye newspaper, Tralee, 27 January 2005
- Obituary P.D. O'Donnell, RIP on page 4 of O'Domhnaill Abu, O'Donnell Clan Newsletter no. 33, Donegal, Spring 2005.
