= Salt (surname) =

Salt is a surname, and may refer to:

- Barbara Salt (1904–1975), British diplomat
- Barry Salt (born 1933), Australian film historian
- Bernard Salt, Australian financial writer
- Charlotte Salt (born 1985), English actress
- Edward Salt (1881–1970), British politician
- Eliot Salt (born 1994), English actress
- Ernie Salt (1897–1940), English footballer
- George Salt (1903–2003), English entomologist
- Haddon Salt (born 1928) is a British-American businessman
- Harold Salt (footballer), English footballer
- Harold Salt (British Army officer) (1879–1971), British general
- Harry Salt (1899–1971), English footballer
- Henry Salt (Egyptologist) (1780–1827), English artist, traveller and diplomat
- Henry Stephens Salt (1851–1939), English writer and campaigner for social reforms
- Herbert Salt (1880–1967), English footballer
- Jack Salt (born 1996), New Zealand basketball player
- Jennifer Salt (born 1944), American actress, producer and screenwriter
- John Salt (1937–2021), English artist
- John Salt (bishop) (1941–2017), British Anglican bishop
- John Stevenson Salt (1777–1845), English banker
- John Salt (bishop), South African Anglican bishop
- Jonathan Salt (botanist) (1759–1815)
- Jonathan Salt (cricketer) (born 1991), English cricketer
- Len Salt (born c. 1956), New Zealand local politician
- Maz Salt, Australian impresario and restaurateur.
- Micah Salt (c.1847–1915), English archaeologist
- Michelle Salt (born 1985), Canadian paralympic snowboarder
- Paul Salt English radio and television presenter
- Phil Salt (born 1996), Welsh-born cricketer for Sussex
- Phil Salt (footballer) (born 1979), English footballer
- Sam Salt (1940–2009), British admiral
- Sammy Salt (1938–1999), English footballer
- Samuel Salt (died 1792), English lawyer and politician
- Thomas Salt (1830–1904), British banker and politician
- Titus Salt (1803–1876), English textile manufacturer and benefactor
- Waldo Salt (1914–1987), American screenwriter
- William Salt (1808–1863), English banker and genealogist

== See also ==
- Sault (surname)
