= Cline Cellars =

Winery in California, United States

Coordinates: 38.21414°N 122.45833°W

Cline Cellars Winery
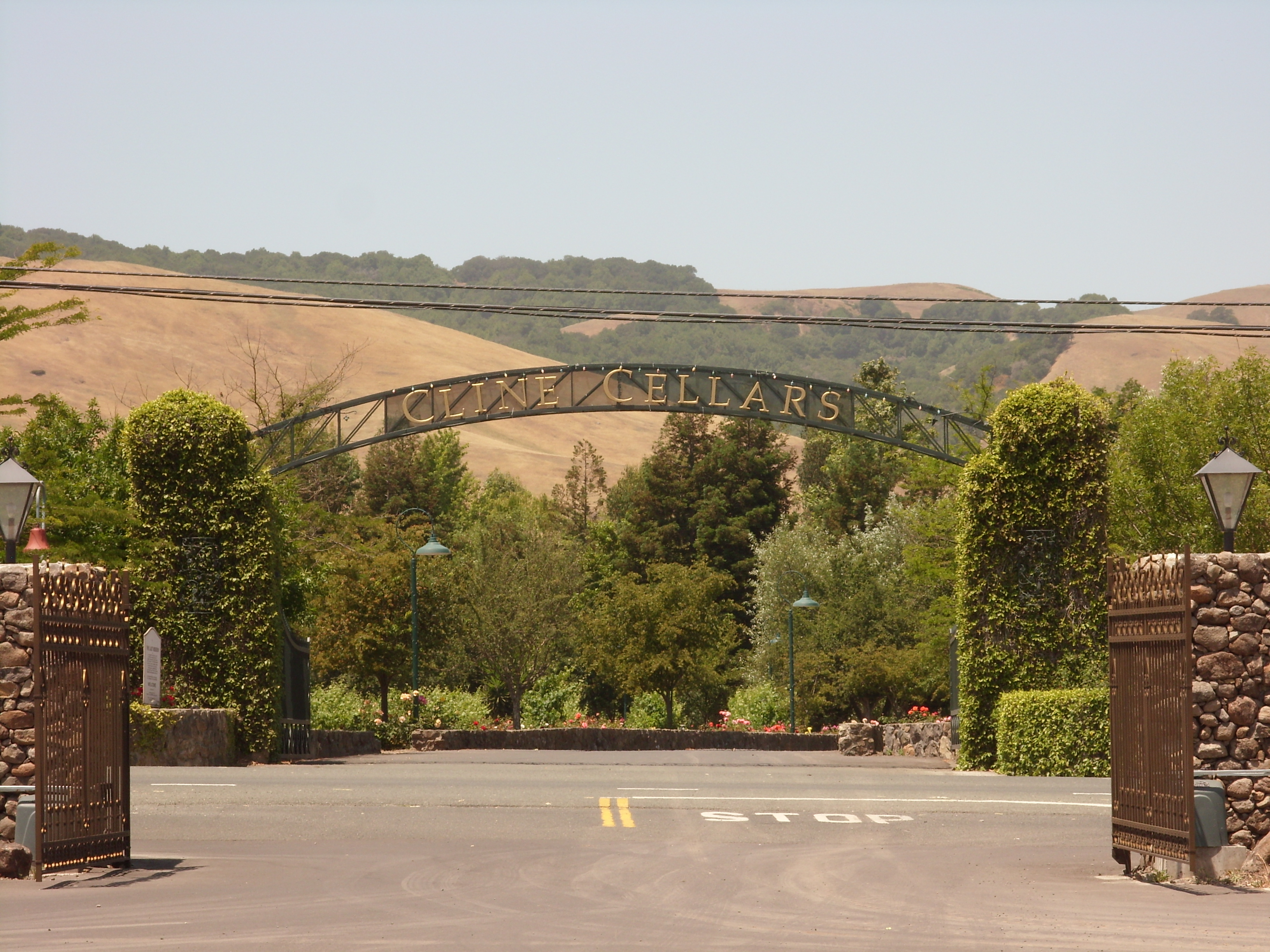
- Location: Sonoma, California, US
- Appellation: Carneros AVA
- Other labels: Farmhouse, Cashmere
- Founded: 1982
- First vintage: 1982
- Key people: Nancy and Fred Cline, Proprietors; John Grant, CEO; Hilary Cline, Vice President of Marketing and DtC; Tom Gendall, Director of Winemaking and Viticulture;
- Known for: Ancient Vines Zinfandel, Rhône varietals, Pinot Noir, Chardonnay
- Varietals: Zinfandel, Mourvèdre, Carignane, Pinot noir, Syrah, Viognier, Marsanne, Rousanne
- Distribution: International
- Tasting: Open to the public
- Website: www.clinecellars.com

Cline Cellars Winery is a family owned and operated winery located in the Carneros wine appellation of Sonoma County, California, that specializes in Zinfandels, Rhône-style wines, Chardonnay and Pinot Noir.

== History ==
In 1982, after receiving an inheritance of 9,000 dollars from his maternal grandfather, Valeriano Jacuzzi, one of the seven Jacuzzi brothers credited for inventing the Jacuzzi whirlpool bath, Fred Cline opened Cline Cellars winery in Contra Costa County in the town of Oakley, California. Fred Cline was one of the first vintners to plant French Rhône varietals in California, and is one of the original Rhone Rangers.

In 1991 Fred Cline and his wife Nancy Cline, relocated the winery from Oakley, California, to a 350-acre property in the Carneros region of the Sonoma Valley that is the site of a former Miwok village and the original site of Mission San Francisco de Solano. In the 1850s the property was owned by German immigrants Julius & Katherine Adolph Poppe, who operated a dairy and supplied the majority of San Francisco with carp, which they kept in six spring-fed ponds that remain on the property. In the 1970s the property was bought by Haddon Salt of H. Salt Esq. Fish and Chips to raise horses. Cline purchased the property from Salt in 1989. In 2007 Fred and Nancy Cline opened Jacuzzi Family Vineyards across the street from Cline Cellars as a tribute to Fred's maternal grandparents.

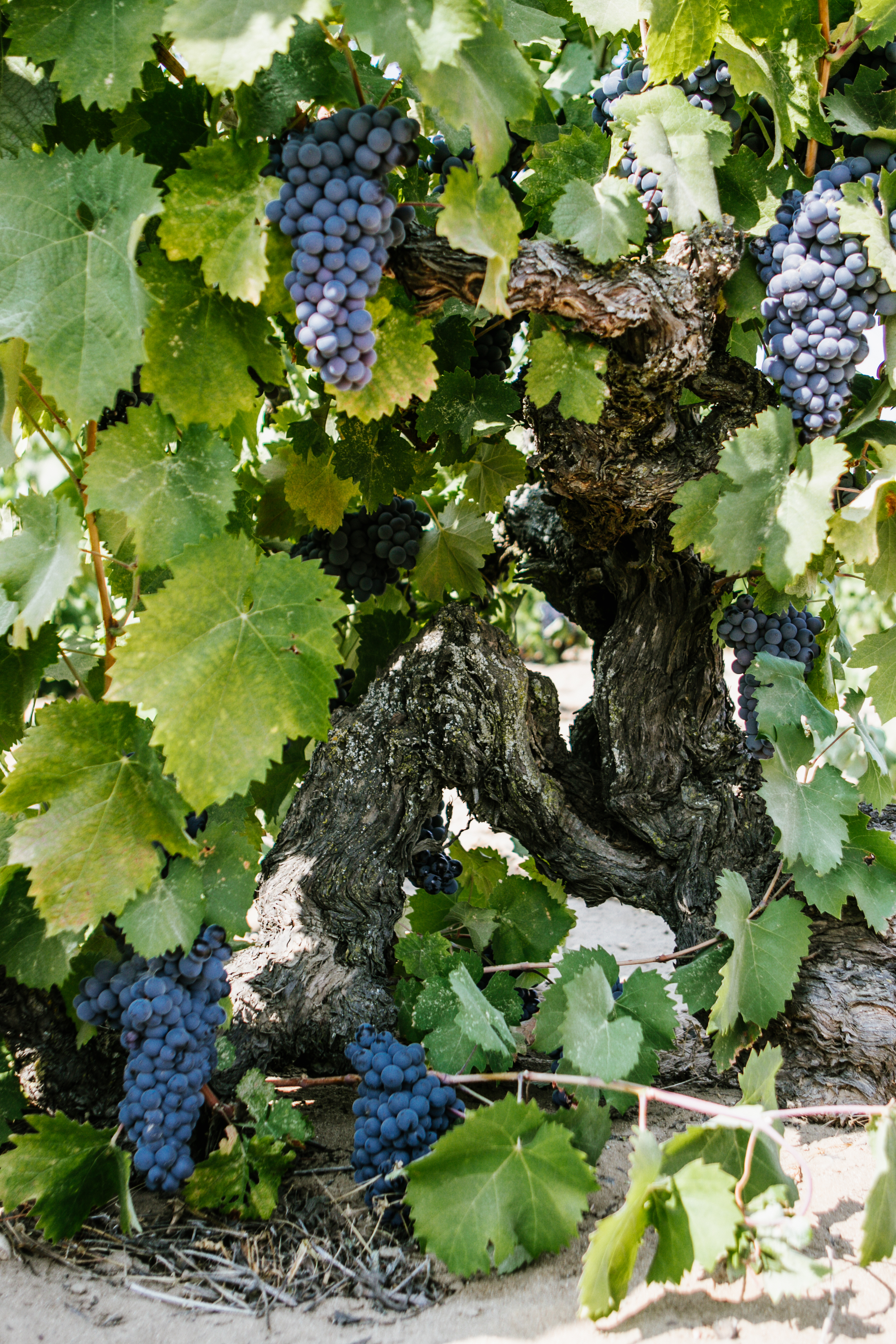
Cline Ancient Vines

== Vineyards and farming practices ==
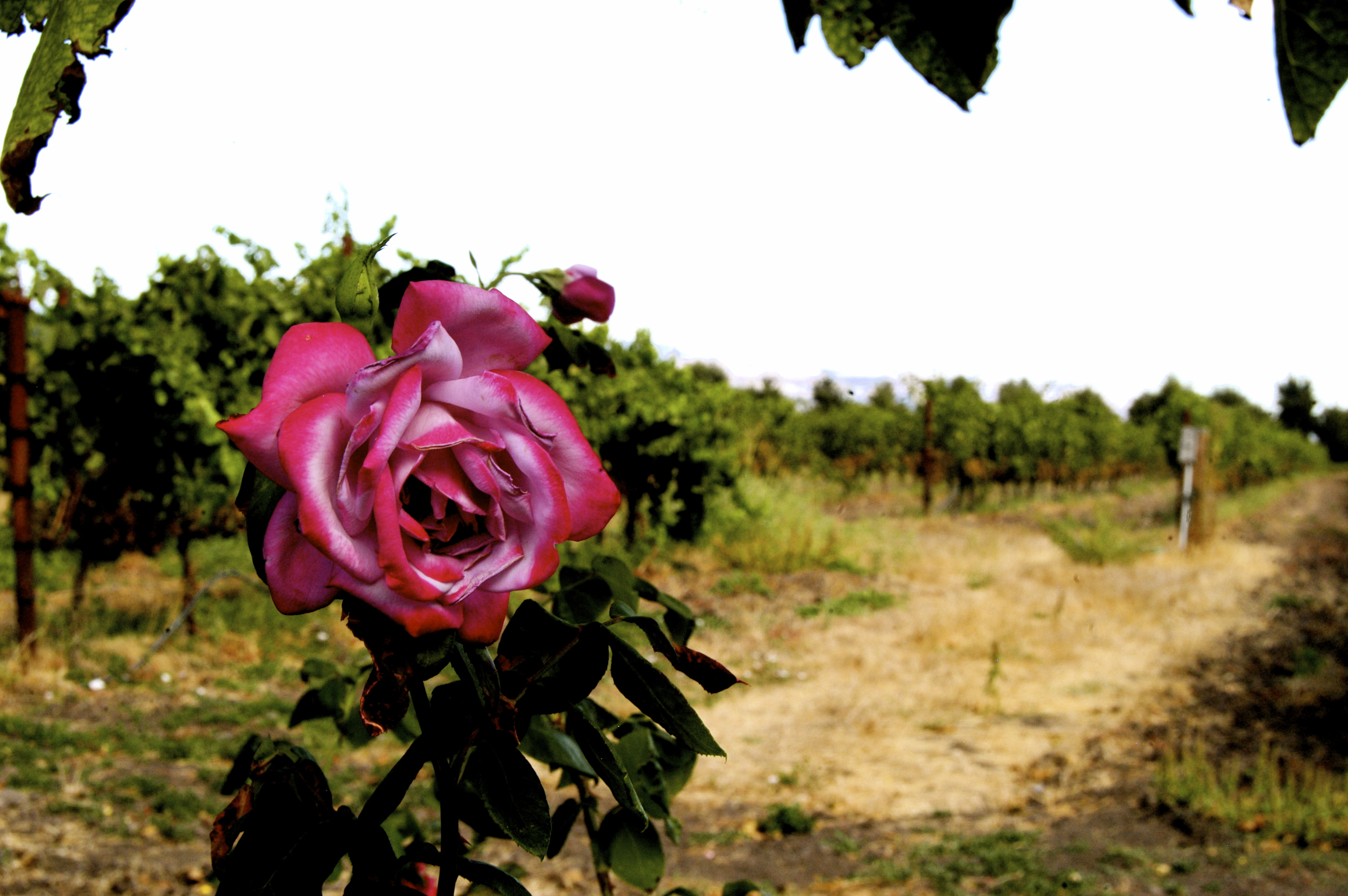
A vineyard owned by Cline Cellars in Sonoma County

Cline Cellars is best known for production of their "ancient vines" wines out of Contra Costa County. The head winemaker is Tom Gendall, who joined the operation in 2017. The Cline's historic Oakley vineyards are planted with Mourvèdre, Carignane, Grenache, Palomino and Zinfandel. The vines range in age from 80 to 120 years old. Approximately 42 acres of Carignane and Zinfandel vines were planted in 1906 and 1925, and 14 acres of Mourvèdre vines date back to 1920. The sand soil of Contra Costa County is naturally resistant to phylloxera. The vineyards in Contra Costa County are all on their original rootstock, and the vine-eating aphid never affected newer plantings.

The winery is dedicated to sustainability and their farming processes reflect this dedication. Cline Cellars is Certified California Sustainable in the vineyard and in the winery as well as Sonoma County Certified Sustainable. It became the second largest winery in California that is completely solar powered when it installed 34,625 square feet of solar panels. Cline calls his farming practices Green String certified for his use of natural cover crops to nourish soils, practice of using sheep to eliminate weeds in the vineyards, and use of compost teas for fertilizer instead of petroleum based equivalents.

== Visiting ==
=== Tasting room ===
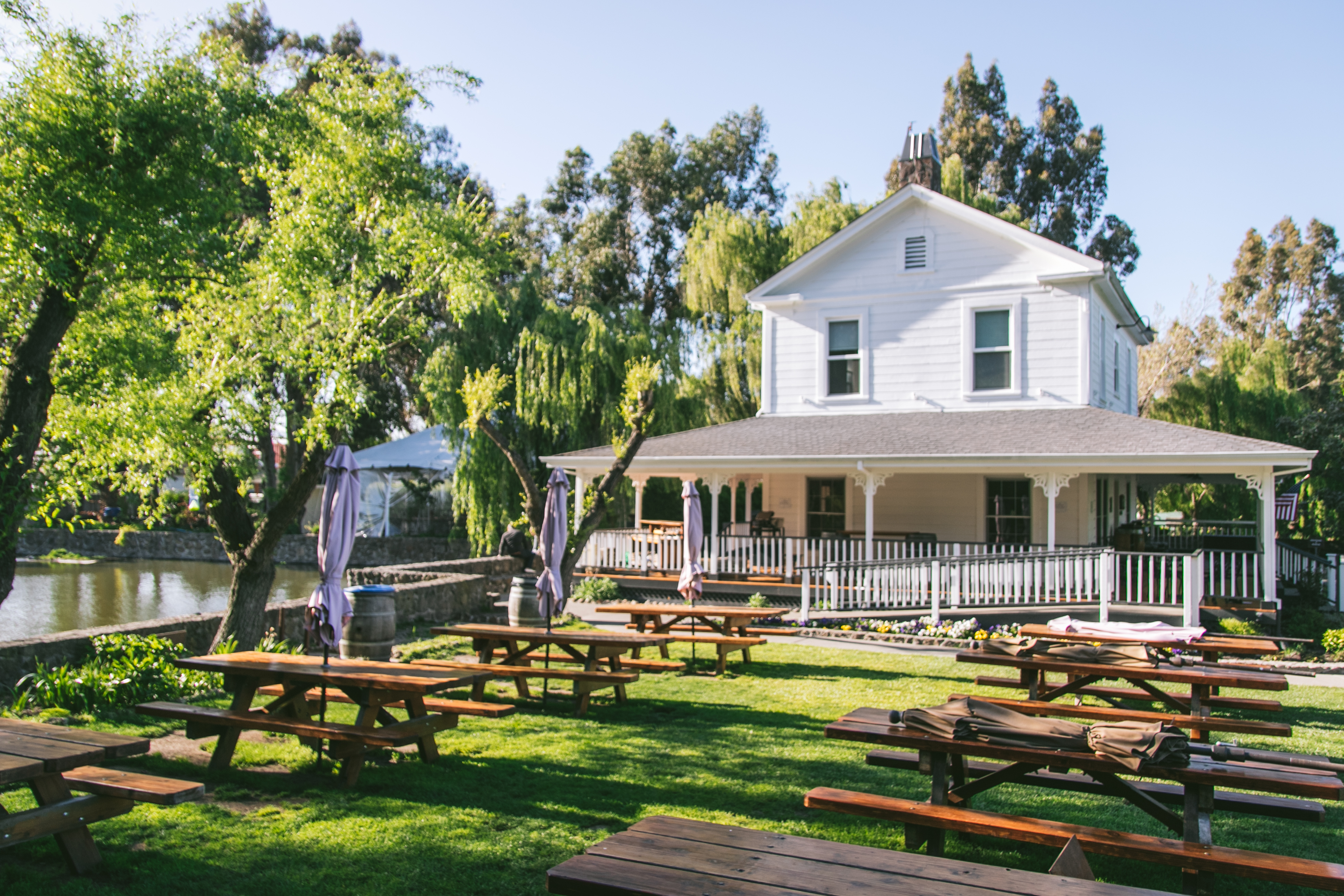
Cline Family Cellars farmhouse built in 1853

The tasting room is located in a rustic 1850s farmhouse that is original to the property and is surrounded by six spring-fed ponds and thousands of rose bushes. The winery is open to the public daily for touring and tasting and a wine club is offered to interested parties.

=== California Missions Museum ===
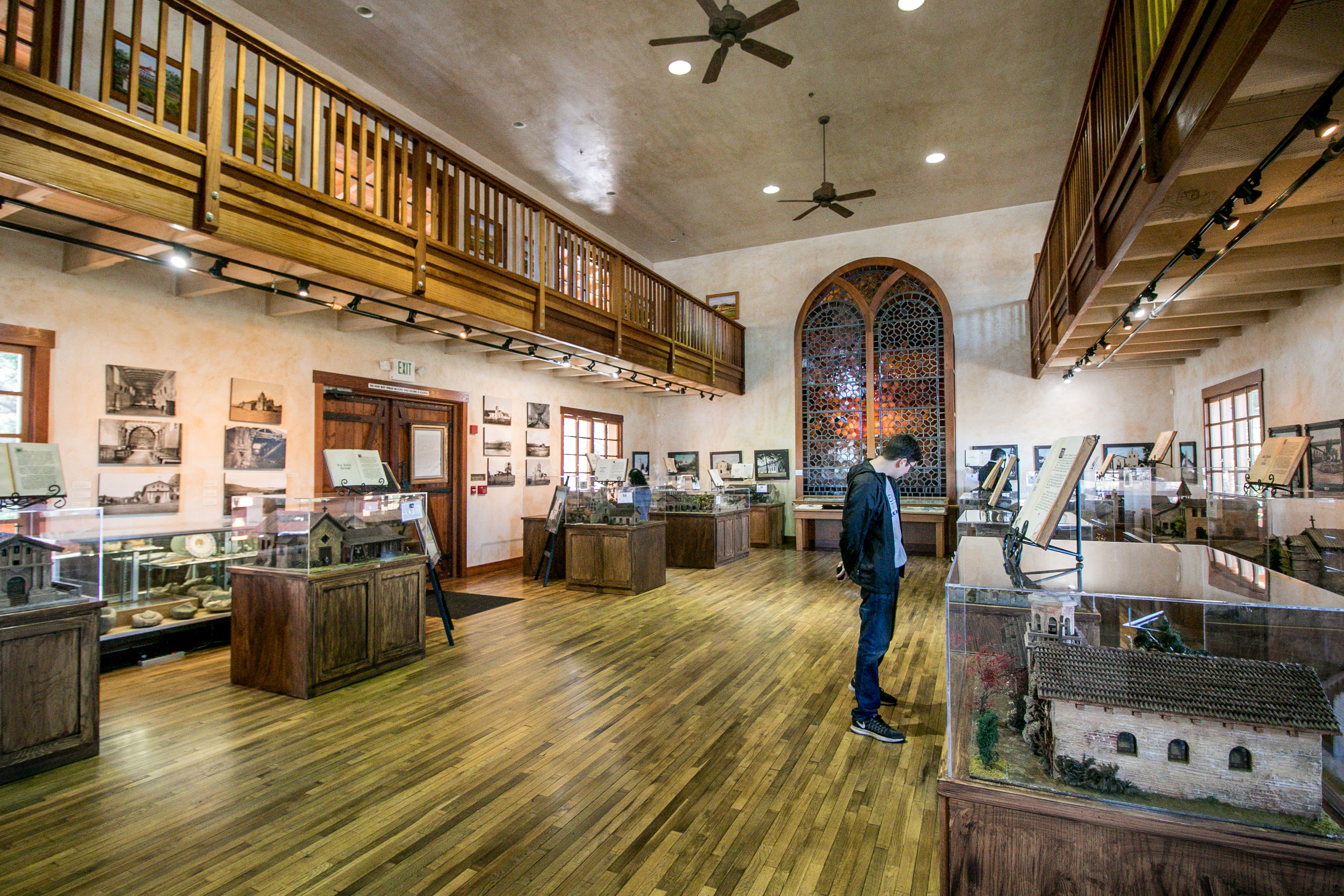
California Mission Museum at Cline Cellars

To celebrate the site's history and connection to the Sonoma Mission, Nancy Cline opened the California Missions Museum on the property in 2005. The museum was built to house a full set of California Mission models that were constructed by a team of German cabinetmakers for the 1939 Golden Gate International Exposition. In 1998, the Cline family saved the California Mission models from being auctioned off individually and built the museum for their display. The museum also features a life-sized figure of Father Junipero Serra, mission paintings by Robert Morris and Henry Nelson, and two stained-glass panels originally housed in San Francisco's Mission Dolores prior to the 1906 San Francisco earthquake. The museum is open to the public daily and admission is free of charge.

== See also ==
- Sonoma County wine
