= Pochin =

Pochin is a British surname. The surname Pochin is of likely Anglo-Norman origin, with possible roots in the Norman personal name Pocin, introduced to England after the Norman Conquest of 1066. It has been historically associated with Leicestershire, where the Pochin family held land. Another theory links the name to the Middle English word pouche (meaning "pouch" or "bag"), possibly as a diminutive occupational surname. Some sources also suggest French Huguenot origins, connecting Pochin to French surnames like Pochon or Pochet, which were associated with tailoring or garment trades. Variants of the surname include Pocin, Pochon, and Pockin. Notable people with the surname include:

- Agnes Pochin (1825–1908), British campaigner for women's rights
- Edward Pochin (1909–1990), British physician
- Henry Pochin (1824–1895), British industrial chemist and politician
- Juliette Pochin (born 1971), Welsh classically trained mezzo-soprano singer, composer/arranger, and record producer
- Sarah Pochin (born 1969), British politician, elected MP in 2025
