= Francis Fortescue Urquhart =

English academic (1868–1934)

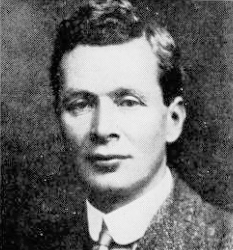
- Born: 1868; Montreux, Switzerland
- Died: 18 September 1934 (aged 66); Oxford, England
- Education: Old Windsor; Stonyhurst College; Balliol College, Oxford
- Occupation: Academic
- Parents: David Urquhart (father); Harriet Angelina Fortescue (mother)

Francis Fortescue Urquhart (1868–1934) was an English academic, the first Roman Catholic to act as a tutorial fellow in the University of Oxford since the 16th century.

== Early life ==
He was born in Montreux, Switzerland, the son of David Urquhart and Harriet Angelina Fortescue. His father died in 1877, and his uncle Chichester Parkinson-Fortescue, 1st Baron Carlingford, played an important role in bringing him up; his middle name Fortescue was added in recognition. He was educated at Beaumont College, Old Windsor, and Stonyhurst College, before becoming a student at Balliol College, Oxford.

He acquired the nickname "Sligger" as an undergraduate, around 1892.

== Career ==
He was lecturer in history (from 1895) and Fellow (from 1896), at Balliol, later becoming Dean. He settled into a life as a "college man", spending much of his time entertaining students, whom he would also take on "reading parties" to his chalet at Chamonix in the vacation.

Undergraduates who were in some way in his circle included Harold Macmillan, Evelyn Waugh, Cyril Connolly, Anthony Powell, Harold Nicolson, Quintin Hogg and many others. He is often taken as having influenced the fictional characters of Mr Samgrass in Waugh's Brideshead Revisited and, more closely, Sillery in Powell's A Dance to the Music of Time, as well as a character of Walter Pater. Urquhart was a contributor to The Month, the Journal of Theological Studies, and the Dublin Review, and wrote articles for the Catholic Encyclopedia, but, as the college history puts it "he made no direct contribution of his own to historical scholarship".

== Personal life ==
He died on 18 September 1934.

== Additional sources ==
- Bailey, Cyril. Francis Fortescue Urquhart: a Memoir. Macmillan and Co., 1936.
