= Harold Salt =

Harold Salt may refer to:

- Harold Salt (British Army officer) (1879–1971), British general
- Harold Salt (footballer), football player for Port Vale
- Harry Salt (1899–1971), English football player
