= Reginald Talbot =

British Army officer, Member of Parliament and Governor of Victoria

Major-General The Honourable Sir Reginald Talbot KCB
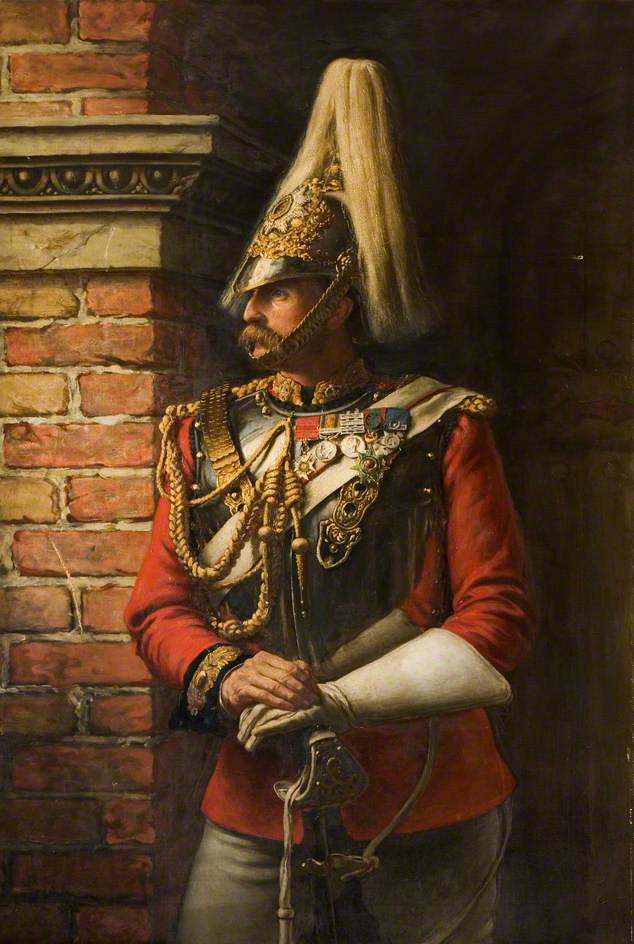
- Portrait by Archibald Stuart-Wortley

11th Governor of Victoria
- In office 25 April 1904 – 6 July 1908
- Monarch: Edward VII
- Premier: Sir Thomas Bent
- Preceded by: Sir George Clarke
- Succeeded by: Sir Thomas Gibson-Carmichael

Personal details
- Born: 11 July 1841 London, England
- Died: 15 January 1929 (aged 87) London, England
- Spouse: Margaret Jane Stuart-Wortley
- Occupation: Soldier

Military service
- Allegiance: United Kingdom
- Branch/service: British Army
- Years of service: 1859–1903
- Rank: Major-General
- Commands: British Troops in Egypt (1899–1902); 1st Regiment of Life Guards (1885–1886)
- Battles/wars: Anglo-Zulu War; Nile Expedition
- Awards: Knight Commander of the Order of the Bath

Major-General Sir Reginald Arthur James Talbot, KCB (11 July 1841 – 15 January 1929) was a British Army officer, Member of Parliament, and Governor of Victoria in Australia.

== Early life ==
Talbot was born in London, the third son of Henry, Viscount Ingestre (later 3rd Earl Talbot and then 18th Earl of Shrewsbury) and Lady Sarah Elizabeth, née Beresford, daughter of the 2nd Marquess of Waterford. After attending Harrow School, he joined the British Army and became a sub-lieutenant in the 1st Regiment of Life Guards in 1859.

== Political and military career ==
From 1869 to 1874, Talbot represented Stafford in the British House of Commons for the Conservative Party. On 8 May 1877, he married Margaret Jane Stuart-Wortley, granddaughter of the 1st Baron Wharncliffe.

He returned to active service in the army, fighting in the Anglo-Zulu War, Egypt and taking part in the unsuccessful Nile Expedition to relieve General Charles George Gordon in Khartoum. Talbot was appointed a Companion of the Order of the Bath in 1885. He became General Officer Commanding the British Troops in Egypt in 1899, serving as such until 1903.

He was promoted to Knight Commander of the Order of the Bath in the 1902 Coronation Honours list, and invested in person by the Duke of Connaught on 7 December 1902, when the Prince visited Egypt en route to India.

== Governor of Victoria ==
He was sworn in as Governor of Victoria on 25 April 1904. His tenure was marked by Talbot's determination to achieve visible improvement, and his reports to Britain favourably compared Victoria's economic and educational statistics to those of 1903.

Talbot died in London on 15 January 1929.

== Ancestry ==
Ancestry of Sir Reginald Talbot

8. John Chetwynd-Talbot, 1st Earl Talbot
4. Charles Chetwynd-Talbot, 2nd Earl Talbot
9. Lady Charlotte Hill, Countess Talbot
2. Henry Chetwynd-Talbot, 18th Earl of Shrewsbury
10. Charles Lambart
5. Lady Frances Thomasine Lambart, Countess Talbot
11. Frances Dutton
1. Sir Reginald Talbot
12. George Beresford, 1st Marquess of Waterford
6. Henry Beresford, 2nd Marquess of Waterford
13. Elizabeth Monck, Marchioness of Waterford
3. Lady Sarah Elizabeth Beresford, Countess of Shrewsbury
14. George Carpenter, 2nd Earl of Tyrconnell
7. Susanna Carpenter, Marchioness of Waterford
15. Lady Sarah Hussey Delaval, Countess of Tyrconnell

Parliament of the United Kingdom
Preceded by Walter Meller; Henry Pochin	Member of Parliament for Stafford; 1869–1874; With: Thomas Salt	Succeeded by Alexander Macdonald; Thomas Salt
Military offices
Preceded by Sir Francis Grenfell	General Officer Commanding the British Troops in Egypt; 1899–1903	Succeeded by John Slade
Government offices
Preceded by Sir George Clarke	Governor of Victoria; 1904–1908	Succeeded by Sir Thomas Gibson-Carmichael
Military offices
Preceded by George Salis-Schwabe	Colonel of the 3rd (Prince of Wales's) Dragoon Guards; 1907–1920	Succeeded by Sir Nevill Smyth
