= Sir Philip Rose, 1st Baronet =

British solicitor and later baronet 1816 - 1883

Sir Philip Rose Bt DL
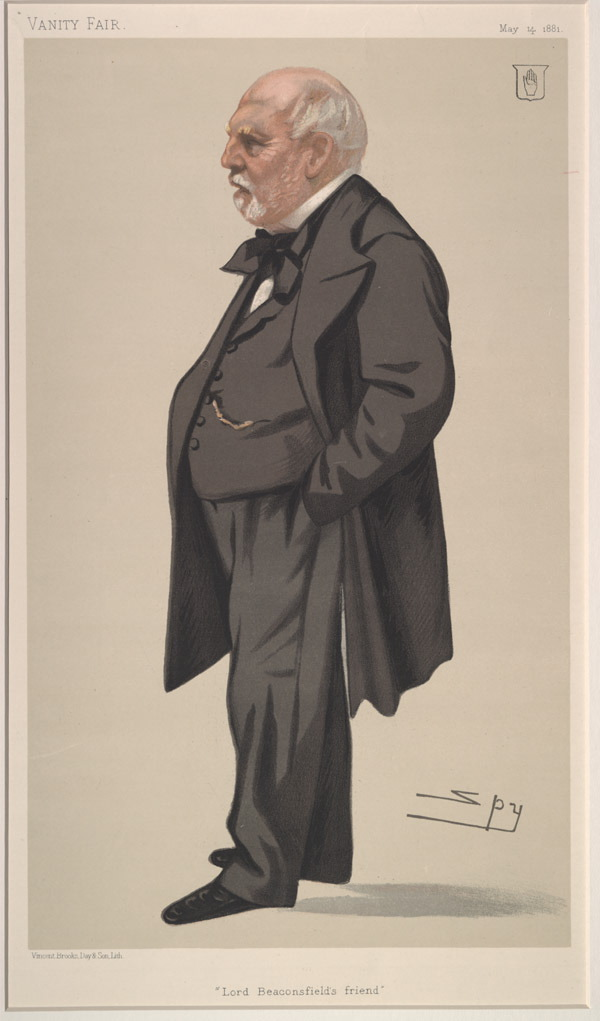
- "Lord Beaconsfield's friend". Caricature by Spy published in Vanity Fair in 1881.

High Sheriff of Buckinghamshire
- In office 1878–1879
- Preceded by: William Burton
- Succeeded by: Edward Coleman

Personal details
- Born: 12 April 1816
- Died: 17 April 1883 (aged 67)
- Spouse: Margaretta Ranking (m. 1840–1883)
- Children: Evelyn St. Croix Fleming
- Parent(s): William Rose (father), Charlotte Rose (mother)
- Occupation: Solicitor, Political agent
- Known for: Political association with Benjamin Disraeli

Sir Philip Rose, 1st Baronet, DL (12 April 1816 – 17 April 1883) was a British solicitor and political agent. A close political associate of Benjamin Disraeli, he is perhaps best-known today as one of the namesakes of the law firm Norton Rose Fulbright.

== Biography ==
Rose was the son of William Rose, Esq. of High Wycombe, an Assistant Surgeon in the British Indian Army, and Charlotte Rose (born Baly).

He was admitted as a solicitor in 1836 at the age of 20 and for many years was a partner in the law firm of Baxter, Rose, Norton & Co., resigning his partnership in 1872 after a disagreement with his colleagues. The firm still practices today under the name Norton Rose Fulbright.

At the age of 25, reputedly after one of the clerks at the law firm who was suffering from consumption was refused admittance to several hospitals, Rose was a prime mover in the setting up of a hospital, the Hospital for Consumption and Diseases of the Chest, for sufferers of tuberculosis without the financial means to pay for such treatment as was available at the time. Rose was Honorary-Secretary of the hospital from its inception until his death.

In 1854 he was the first recognised agent for the Conservative Party and after the defeat of Lord Derby's first administration was largely responsible for the restoration of its political fortunes. He was assisted by Markham Spofforth. He had to resign as agent in 1859 because of concerns about corruption. He was also a close friend of and adviser to Benjamin Disraeli. After his resignation from the law firm he devoted himself to public affairs including Treasurer of the County Courts of Derbyshire, Deputy-Lieutenant of Middlesex, and first Magistrate and then in 1878 High Sheriff of Buckinghamshire. He was created a Baronet in 1874 for his work as legal adviser to the Conservative Party.

In 1868 he founded the Foreign & Colonial Investment Trust as The Foreign & Colonial Government Trust, the world's first collective investment scheme.

For special services to the Ottoman Empire he was made a Knight Commander of the Turkish Order of the Medjidie.

He also served as a director of several public companies.

== Family ==
On 2 Jan 1840, at St Clement's Church, Hastings, Sussex, he married Margaretta Ranking (1816–1889), daughter of Robert Ranking. They had ten children, including Sir Philip Frederick Rose, 2nd Bt, and Evelyn St. Croix Fleming, mother of writers Ian Fleming and Peter Fleming.

Party political offices
Preceded by New position	Principal Agent of the Conservative Party; 1854 – 1859	Succeeded by Markham Spofforth
Baronetage of the United Kingdom
New creation	Baronet (of Rayners); 1874–1883	Succeeded by Philip Frederick Rose
