= Walter Meller =

British politician, conservative MP 1865 - 1869

Member of Parliament for Stafford
- In office 11 July 1865 – 13 May 1869 Serving with Henry Pochin (1868–1869); Michael Bass (1865–1868)
- Preceded by: Thomas Sidney; Thomas Salt
- Succeeded by: Thomas Salt; Reginald Talbot

Personal details
- Born: 1819
- Died: 10 January 1886 (aged 66)
- Party: Conservative

Walter Meller (1819 – 10 January 1886) was a British Conservative Party politician.

Meller was elected Conservative MP for Stafford at the 1865 general election and held the seat until 1869, when the 1868 general election result was overturned due to "corrupt practices".

He was married to Elizabeth Peters. After his death, Peters went on to marry Markham Spofforth, Principal Agent of the Conservative Party from 1859 until 1870.

Parliament of the United Kingdom
Preceded by Thomas Sidney; Thomas Salt	Member of Parliament for Stafford; 1865–1869; With: Henry Pochin (1868–1869); Michael Bass (1865–1868)	Succeeded by Thomas Salt; Reginald Talbot
