= Thomas Sidney =

British politician and tea merchant

Member of Parliament for Stafford
- In office 3 August 1860 – 11 July 1865 Serving with Thomas Salt
- Preceded by: John Ayshford Wise; Thomas Salt
- Succeeded by: Michael Bass; Walter Meller
- In office 30 July 1847 – 8 July 1852 Serving with David Urquhart
- Preceded by: Swynfen Carnegie; Edward Manningham-Buller
- Succeeded by: John Ayshford Wise; Arthur Otway

Lord Mayor of London
- In office 1853–1854
- Preceded by: Thomas Challis
- Succeeded by: Francis Moon

Personal details
- Born: 5 January 1805 Stafford, Staffordshire
- Died: 10 March 1889 (aged 84) St Leonards-on-Sea, East Sussex
- Resting place: St Michael-at-Bowes, Bowes Park, Middlesex
- Party: Liberal
- Other political affiliations: Conservative
- Spouse(s): Eleanor Mary Ward (m. 1860) Sarah Hall (m. 1831; died 1857)

Thomas Sidney (5 January 1805 – 10 March 1889) was a British Liberal Party and Conservative Party politician, and tea merchant.

== Family and early life ==
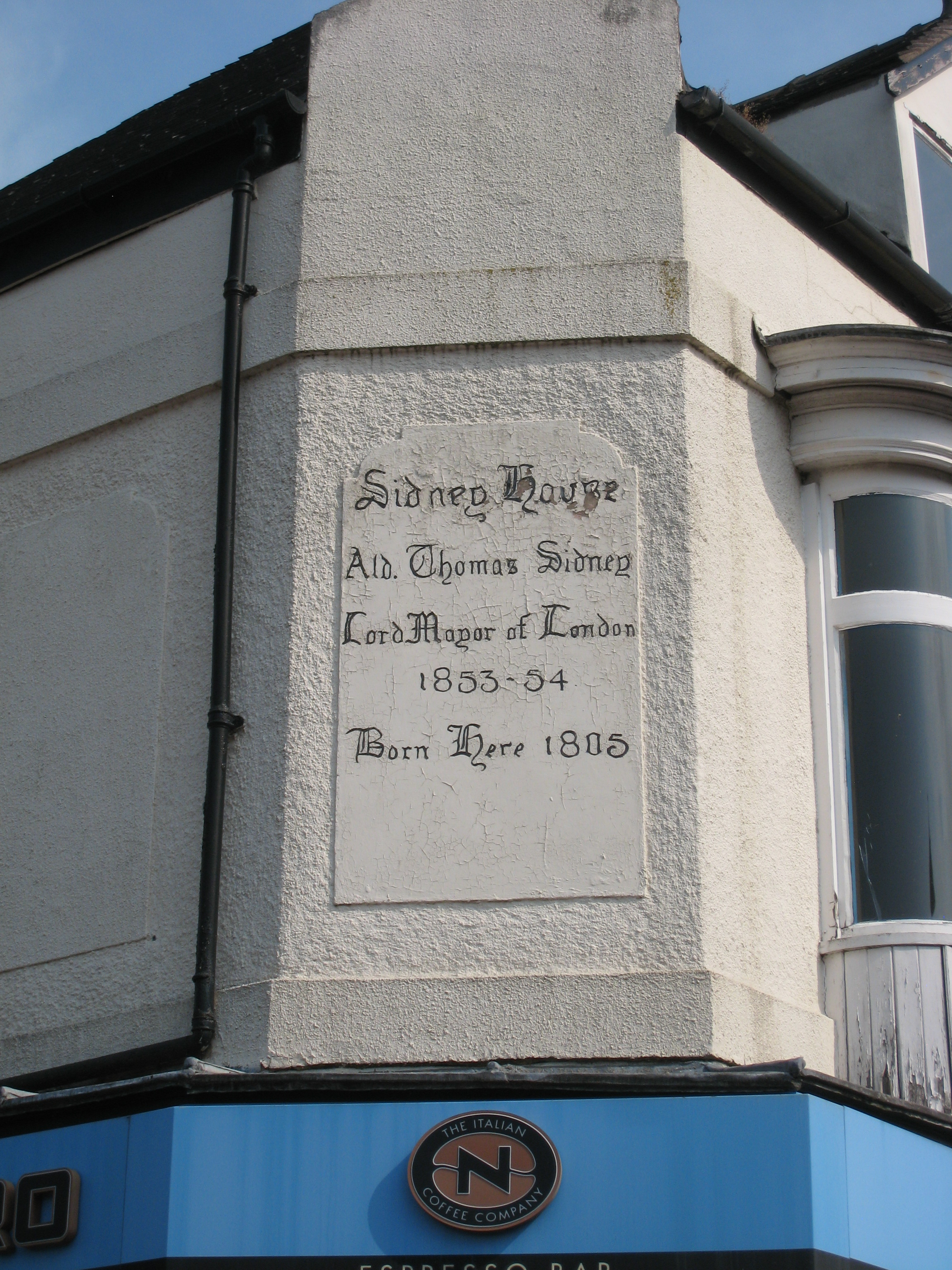
Inscription on his birthplace, Goalgate Street, Stafford

Born in Stafford in 1805 to William Sidney and his wife Ann, Sidney was educated at Stafford Grammar School, becoming a tea importer and merchant on Ludgate Hill in 1838. He first married to Sarah Hall, daughter of William Hall, in 1831, and they one daughter, Ellen (born c. 1832). After Sarah's death in 1857, he remarried to Eleanor Mary Ward, daughter of W. Ward, on 12 January 1860. He had at least one other child, Thomas Stafford.

== Political career ==
Sidney's political career began as City Councillor of the City of London for Farringdon Ward for 1843 to 1844, and then as alderman of Billingsgate in 1844, a position he held for 36 years. He was also appointed Sheriff of the City of London and Middlesex in 1844, and Lord Mayor of London from 1853 to 1854. Incidentally, he was followed in this role by Francis Moon, the father of his son-in-law Reverend Edward Graham Moon, who had married his daughter Ellen.

He was first elected Conservative MP for Stafford at the 1847 general election, but stood down at the next election in 1852 in order to stand for Leeds where he was unsuccessful. He again unsuccessfully sought election in 1857 for Worcester as a Peelite Conservative, and then returned to Stafford to seek re-election as a Liberal in 1859.

He later returned to Parliament as a Liberal member after a by-election in 1860 — caused by the resignation of John Ayshford Wise — and held the seat until the 1865 general election, when he retired.

== Bowes Manor ==
In 1855, Sidney leased the Bowes Manor in Bowes Park, after the death of Sir Thomas Wilde, 1st Baron Truro, later purchasing the property in 1866. He began developing the western border of the estate in 1870, laying out what is now Palmerston Road in around 1870, and building 30 large houses backing onto the New River. He also paid for much of the construction of the St Michael-at-Bowes Church, which was completed in 1874 and in which he is now buried.

Upon his death in 1889, the manor and estate were put up for sale, but no purchasers came forward, and it was instead leased to the guardians of the poor of St Mary's Church, Islington; it later became ran down and divided up for development, and then sold for building in 1899.

== Other activities ==
Sidney was also a Justice of the Peace for Middlesex and Westminster and a Deputy Lieutenant for London. He was also an Overseer of the Poor in 1849, but was exempted, and then became a churchwarden for 1852/1853.

Parliament of the United Kingdom
Preceded by John Ayshford Wise; Thomas Salt	Member of Parliament for Stafford; 1860–1865; With: Thomas Salt	Succeeded by Michael Bass; Walter Meller
Preceded by Swynfen Carnegie; Edward Manningham-Buller	Member of Parliament for Stafford; 1847–1852; With: David Urquhart	Succeeded by John Ayshford Wise; Arthur Otway
Political offices
Preceded by Thomas Challis	Lord Mayor of London; 1853–1854	Succeeded by Francis Moon
