= John Ayshford Wise =

British politician

Member of Parliament for Stafford
- In office 8 July 1852 – 30 August 1860 Serving with Thomas Salt (1859–1860); Charles Chetwynd-Talbot (1857–1859); Arthur Otway (1852–1857)
- Preceded by: David Urquhart; Thomas Sidney
- Succeeded by: Thomas Sidney; Thomas Salt

Personal details
- Born: 1810
- Died: 9 September 1865 (aged 55)
- Party: Liberal
- Other political affiliations: Whig

John Ayshford Wise (1810 – 9 September 1865) was a British Liberal and Whig politician.

Wise was first elected Whig MP for Stafford at the 1852 general election and, becoming a Liberal in 1859, held the seat until 1860, when he resigned by becoming Steward of the Manor of Hempholme, causing a by-election.

Parliament of the United Kingdom
Preceded by David Urquhart; Thomas Sidney	Member of Parliament for Stafford; 1852–1860; With: Thomas Salt (1859–1860); Charles Chetwynd-Talbot (1857–1859); Arthur Otway (1852–1857)	Succeeded by Thomas Sidney; Thomas Salt
