= Mission of the Vixen =

Conflict between Britain and Russia in 1836

- Part of the Russo-Circassian War
Date	1836
Location	Sudzhuk-Kale

Belligerents
Russian Empire	(United Kingdom of Great Britain and Ireland) British Empire; Circassia

Commanders and leaders
(Russian Empire) Nicholas I	(United Kingdom of Great Britain and Ireland) David Urquhart (POW) (United Kingdom of Great Britain and Ireland) James Bell (POW)

The mission of the Vixen (Russian: Дело «Виксена»; Adyghe: «Виксен»-ым иIоф) was a conflict between the Russian Empire and the United Kingdom that occurred in 1836. The Russians detained a British ship and the British protested Russia’s invasion of Circassia, bringing the two countries to the brink of war.

== Russian background ==
Under the treaty of Adrianople, the Russian Empire had been granted the East coast of the Black Sea by the Ottoman Empire. However, Russia did not have complete control over these territories (the Circassian coast) from Anapa in the north to Sochi in the south. The "mountaineers" (the Circassian [Adyghe] people) resisted the Russian authorities and did not admit Russian control over their country Circassia, because Circassia was not part of the Ottoman Empire and the relations between Circassia and the Ottoman Empire were mainly commercial and religious. The mountaineers (Adyghe) were supported by English, French and the Polish immigrants. They were supplied with weapons and ammunition from abroad. On March 4, 1832, an instruction for the Black Sea cruisers was published in attempt to stop these deliveries. It said:

For preservation of the Russian possessions from infection and to prevent the delivery of military supplies to the mountain people, military cruisers will permit foreign commercial vessels only to two points – Anapa and Redoute-Kale in which there is a quarantine and customs...

Great Britain regarded it as infringement of the principle of freedom of commerce.

== British background ==
The story begins in Egypt. As a result of Muhammad Ali of Egypt's semi-rebellion, the Turks were driven to sign the Treaty of Hünkâr İskelesi with Russia (1833). This threatened to make the Ottoman Empire a Russian protectorate. Under a secret article, the Turks would close the Dardanelles access to British and French warships while allowing Russian warships into the Mediterranean. This led to an anti-Russian agitation in England. In 1834, David Urquhart went to Circassia and made contact with the rebels. In 1836, he was captured in the Vixen. From 1837 to 1840, James Stanislaus Bell, Edmond Spencer and J. A. Longworth (of the Times) were also in Circassia. All three published memoirs. Their relation to the British government is uncertain. All four have been accused of implying that they have more influence on the British government than they in fact had, and offering the Circassians false hope of British support that probably would not have materialised.

== Capture ==
In November 1836, the Russian military brig Ajax detained the British schooner Vixen in (Adyghe: Цӏэмэз, Ts'emez) in the seaport of Sudzhuk-Kale (now Novorossiysk). At the moment of detention, 8 guns, 28,800 pounds of gunpowder, and a significant amount of other weapons had already been unloaded. This was deemed a provocation by the Russians, instigated by the first secretary of the British embassy in Constantinople, David Urquhart. Polish immigrants also participated in the organisation of the incident. The crew received instructions to go to Sudzhuk-Kale, where meeting with a Russian cruiser was almost inevitable. The owner of the schooner was recommended not to avoid this, but, on the contrary, to search for this meeting in every possible way.

== Reaction ==
The reaction in London to the seizure was one of outrage. The Conservatives brought up in Parliament a question on the legality of Circassia being under the jurisdiction of the Russian Empire. Russia was threatened with war. After angry statements from London, Nicholas I of Russia ordered the army and fleet into a condition of raised battle readiness. The schooner, according to the instruction, was confiscated, and its crew was sent to Constantinople.

== Consequences ==
The conflict threatened to develop into war between Russia and Britain, but by April 1837 relations had settled down. Urquhart was withdrawn to London. Britain was reluctant to antagonise Russia further, as it could not find a continental ally willing to lend support in a war. The official answer of the government and the Liberal Party to an inquiry by the Conservatives stated that Russia owned Circassia lawfully under the Adrianople peace treaty. Russia, therefore, continued its blockade of the east coast of Black Sea. The conflict became one of a number of episodes of Russian-British rivalry of the 1830s and 1840s, which were eventually to escalate into the Crimean War.
