= Arthur Lumley Davids =

- Asher Lumle Davids
- Born: 28 August 1811; Hampshire, England
- Died: 19 July 1832; London, England
- Parents: Jonki Davids (father); Sarah Lumley (mother)

Arthur Lumley Davids (born Asher Lumle Davids; 28 August 1811 – 19 July 1832) was an English orientalist and linguist. He was born in Hampshire, the only child of Jewish parents, Sarah Lumley and Jonki Davids.

He was sent to an Anglican school with the purpose of preparing him for an English university. From an early age, he applied himself to the study of mechanics, music, and experimental philosophy. Described as a child prodigy, his intelligence was soon discovered. During his early education, he once delivered a lecture on chemistry before the whole school. However, when Davids was ten years old, his father died, and he relocated to London with his mother.

Davids committed himself to learning the Oriental languages of Turkish, Hebrew, Arabic, and Persian, along with the European languages of Greek, Latin, French, Italian, and German. However, he was particularly devoted to the Turkish language. Wishing to follow the legal profession, he entered the office of a solicitor but, as a Jew, he was prevented from proceeding to the bar. This led him to become involved in the cause of the Civil Emancipation of the Jews, and he advocated his beliefs several times in the London Times. He took part in the formation of a Society for the Cultivation of Hebrew Literature and, in 1830, at one of the meetings, he presented a lecture on the literature and philosophy of the Jews. He was described as having principles of the "strictest probity and honour", a mild and unassuming manner, and a "candid and communicative" disposition.

Davids is best known for his work, the Grammar of the Turkish Language, published in 1832 and dedicated to Mahmud II, the Sultan of Turkey. It was the first book on the subject to be published in Europe since 1709. In 1836, his mother prepared a French translation of his work. His book was used extensively in some of David Urquhart's work.

Davids fell ill early in the morning of 19 July 1832 and, not wanting to alarm his mother, he did not call for assistance. He died the same day, a little over a month before his 21st birthday and only three weeks after his book was published. The cause of death was cholera. He is buried in Bury Street, London, and therefore probably belonged to the Bevis Marks Synagogue. His mother later remarried, to the London architect Nathaniel Handford.
