= Sault (surname) =

Sault is a surname, and may refer to:

- Ray Sault (born 1952), Australian rules footballer
- Richard Sault (died 1702), English mathematician, editor and translator

== See also ==
- Salt (surname)
