= Markham Spofforth =

Lawyer and political agent (1825–1907)

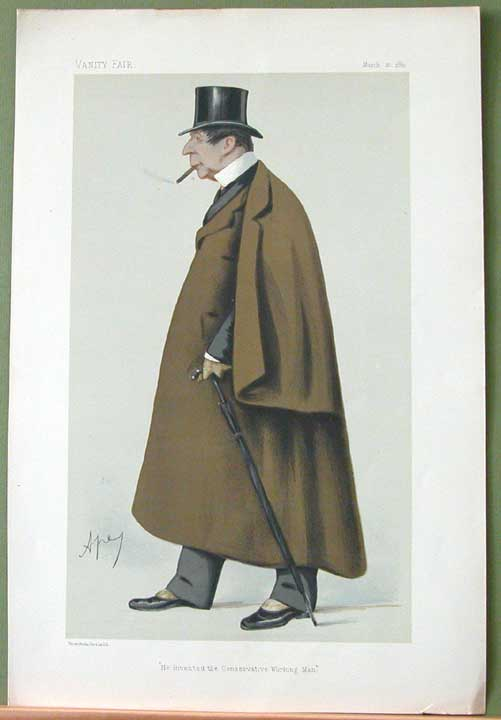

Markham Spofforth (14 March 1825 – 26 January 1907) was a British solicitor and political agent. He was Principal Agent of the Conservative Party from 1859 to 1870. A close adviser to Benjamin Disraeli, he rebuilt the Conservative Party's system of agents in the constituencies, which had been destroyed in the party split of 1846. He came to know Disraeli after being the assistant to Philip Rose, Disraeli's personal lawyer and the Conservative party's first agent. Spofforth took over the role as Principal Agent when Rose had to resign in 1859 following accusations of corruption.

He first married Agnes Loudon, daughter of John and Jane Loudon in 1858. She died in 1863. He married his second wife in 1889. She was Elizabeth Meller (née Peters), widow of Walter Meller, Conservative MP for Stafford from 1865 until 1869.

He resigned as Principal Agent in 1870, plagued by accusations of electoral corruption, and was succeeded by John Eldon Gorst. At Disraeli's instigation, Spofforth was appointed a Senior Taxing Master in Chancery in 1876. He was criticised for a lack of discretion.

He died on 26 January 1907 at his home in Knightsbridge, London, and was buried in Kensal Green cemetery.
