= H. Salt Esq. Fish & Chips =

American fish and chips restaurant chain

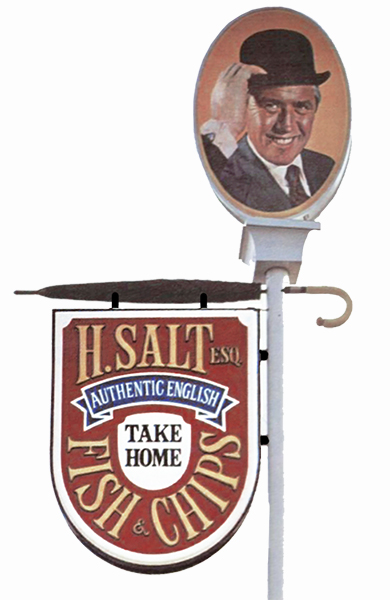
- H. Salt Fish & Chips street sign, c. 1969
- Trade name: H. Salt, Esq. Authentic English Fish and Chips
- Formerly: Salt's English Fish & Chips Shop
- Type: Fast food restaurant
- Founded: 1965; 61 years ago in Sausalito, California, U.S
- Founder: Haddon Salt

H. Salt Esq. Fish & Chips is a restaurant chain specializing in British-style fish and chips, founded by Haddon Salt in Sausalito, California, in 1965. Salt followed his father and grandfather in becoming a master fish cook and entrepreneur.

Salt's business was acquired by the Kentucky Fried Chicken corporation in 1969. The sale made Salt the third largest stockholder in KFC, at the time the world's largest fast-food company.

KFC was not successful in the large-scale expansion of the H. Salt Esq. chain and cut its ties to the brand and business in 1987. Each franchisee was allowed to purchase their restaurant. A few independently owned H. Salt Esq. restaurants are still up and running around California.

== History ==
Haddon Salt, born October 18, 1928, in Stanfree, Derbyshire, England, emigrated with his wife and three children to California in 1964 with US$10,000. "I decided to bring the business here because all the tourists told me if they had fish and chips in America like I cooked them, I'd have a great business". Salt opened "Salt's English Fish & Chips Shop" in Sausalito, California, in 1965.

Salt's wife Grace managed their first fish and chips shop in Sausalito while Salt opened another store in Berkeley. It was reported the Salts planned "to establish a number of franchised shops in various locations throughout the Bay Area and perhaps even more extensively". By 1966, the Sausalito store was selling fish and chips in a checked paper basket and encouraging customers to "eat fish as you walk along... very common in England".

By 1967, Salt owned two more fish and chip stores, one in Sunnyvale and one in Santa Cruz. They were now named "H. Salt, Esq. Authentic English Fish and Chips Shoppe".

=== Naming the brand ===
When Salt decided to start franchising his fish and chips stores, marketing advisers suggested he use "a real English name such as 'British' or 'London', or 'Piccadilly' or 'Old English'" to name his brand. He disagreed, saying:

I turned thumbs down on the idea. In England, as you may know, a good shop carries the name of the merchant. A man who takes pride in the product he is offering the public and who personally stands behind it. It is not a matter of ego but of responsibility to your customers... Therefore, I insisted my name be on the sign.

KFC entered a joint venture with H. Salt in 1969.

=== Equipment ===
Salt was the sole United States and Canadian sales agent for Henry Nuttall fish and chip frying ranges and related equipment. Salt specified Nuttall equipment for his franchised fish and chip stores. Salt often referred to the brand during news interviews, saying:

...I believe you must have the proper cooking equipment. We insist on special stoves to get the heat up properly and even enough to turn out decent fish and chips. We import our stoves from Henry Nuttall in Britain, a master at the art of making frying ranges.

The Nuttall ranges used by Salt were 18 feet long and had glass fronts so patrons could watch their orders being cooked. Salt said the ranges were "the heart of the operation".

=== "English" store design ===
Salt wanted his stores to remind American customers of England but made concessions in their design.

They (the shops) are 'English' to the point where it will not conflict with the food service Americans have come to expect. We even accept British and American currency, but we refuse to clutter them up.

Service personnel behind the glass windowed store fryer counters wore uniforms that reminded customers of traditional British street vendors – red or white aprons, white caps, and vintage white maid's caps.

=== Insistence on providing customers with both quality food and experience ===
Salt understood he was dealing with potential American customers who had little experience with fish and chips. He knew he had to offer the highest quality product and experience to convert the public. He said he "must be frank in stating that there might be a wait for an order simply because we fry on request to assure the product is piping hot which is the only way to enjoy fish and chips". Customer service was important to Salt as well. "We impress upon our proprietors the importance of genuinely caring for the interests of our customers".

== Sale of H. Salt Esq. Fish & Chips to KFC ==
Salt discussed the reasons and process involved in his 1968 decision to sell his business to KFC in The New York Times film documentary The King of Fish and Chips:

We were opening stores everywhere. We eventually wound up with 500. We were growing so quickly. I realized how many components it would take to make this thing work, but only if you do it right. And that's the hard part... getting people to do it right. I admired KFC as the leading food company. They were ahead of McDonald's in those days. When they went public, every franchisee became a multi-millionaire. Within a year the company was worth 500 million [dollars], from two million [dollars].

When the deal was consummated, KFC said they planned to have 1,000 combined company-owned and franchised H. Salt Fish & Chips stores by 1973. KFC newspaper ads offered franchise opportunities, saying:

Haddon Salt, Esq., an urbane 41-year-old Englishman, who, with his Savile Row suits, trim bowler, and tightly furled umbrella, cuts the perfect figure of a proper English gentleman.

In the copy, Salt claimed, "I'll do for English fish and chips what the colonel did for chicken". Salt would "continue as president of the company, which will be a Kentucky Fried Chicken subsidiary" and "will perform a publicity role like other corporate figureheads".

== Aggressive franchise program begins, abruptly stops, restarts ==
KFC immediately started to change Salt's business model, The company began a series of confusing and contradictory changes to the fish and chips franchise operation, promoting franchises priced 450 percent higher than those sold by Salt, then abruptly buying back those franchises and just as quickly restarting a different franchise format.

=== KFC promotes H. Salt Esq. Fish & Chips franchise opportunities ===
In 1969, KFC heavily promoted H. Salt Esq. franchise opportunities in newspaper and magazine print ads. Comparing KFC's having built 2,400 units since 1957, the company claimed they had "invested capital in opening and operating over 400 [H. Salt Esq.] units in 18 markets". The ads promised franchisees would receive "the proven ingredients they need for profitable operation" with "management and operational guidance by the world's most experienced franchise operators, exclusive fish-fry equipment, a quality-controlled source of Icelandic fillets, secret batter ingredients, and expert training to make your employees master fish fryers". Current and former KFC franchisees were given "first crack" at purchasing H. Salt Esq. franchises.

=== KFC increased franchise fees by 450% ===
KFC increased the fee to franchise an H. Salt Esq. Fish & Chips store from $20,000 to $90,000 (equivalent to $790,154 in 2025). The first store to open under the terms of the new agreement was in Louisville, Kentucky. When an H. Salt Esq. store opened in Dayton, Ohio in November 1969, the store saw a first-day total of 2,300 orders of fish and chips.

=== Changes to store format and menu ===
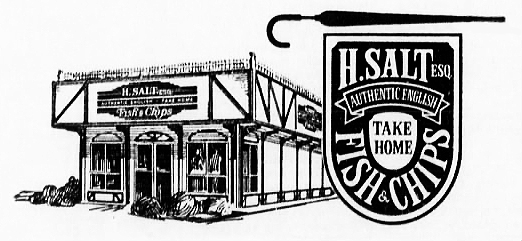
H. Salt Esq. Fish & Chips storefront and logo c. 1972

In 1970 the footprint of new H. Salt Esq. stores were expanded to include 34 seats. "We found that a lot of people like to sit down to eat, rather than carry out, so we will be taking this approach in the new units".

In 1971, KFC pared back additions to the H. Salt fish and chips menu. Salt said, "We tried shrimp... but it spoiled the taste of the fish". After Salt left the company in 1972, KFC once again added shrimp and other seafood to the H. Salt Fish & Chips menu.

=== Corporate buy-back of existing franchises ===
KFC quickly started a buy-back program of franchised H. Salt Esq. stores in late 1969, quickly purchasing previously franchised units. By November 1969, KFC owned 464 H. Salt Esq. outlets.

=== Franchises once again offered ===
One year later, KFC recommenced offering franchises for existing and new H. Salt Esq. locations. Salt was quoted as preferring franchised operations over the company store model. "The franchisee does a better job... We made a mistake with so many company stores, but that is changed".

== KFC acquired by Heublein ==
In July 1971, KFC president John Y. Brown Jr. sold the company to the Connecticut-based Heublein, a packaged food and liquor corporation, for US$285 million (equivalent to $2.265714873×10^{9} in 2025). The business model moving forward called for the closing or franchising of 168 H. Salt Esq. outlets. Salt's contract as "chairman of the fish and chips division" would be assumed by Hueblein according to the sale agreement.

== Erratic refinement of the H. Salt concept by Heublein/KFC ==
=== Contaminated raw fish ===
In 1972, an H. Salt, Esq. customer in Minneapolis complained of worms in his serving of fried fish. A local sanitarian examined 500 individual servings for "worms... 1 1/2 to 2 inches long... thick as a heavy thread... usually found coiled." 17 pieces of fish were removed and the outlet was ordered not to accept any more fish from the New Jersey supplier. The H. Salt area director said the fish, caught and packed by a fishery in Nova Scotia, Canada "came from a supplier not normally used by the company". The contaminated fish had been ordered by KFC's procurement division, not through H. Salt, Esq.'s normal Icelandic supply chain.

=== Larger "Seafood Galley" store format ===
KFC did not enforce Haddon Salt's narrow focus on perfect fish and chips with franchisees. In January 1972, Dolph Brown, who owned four franchised H. Salt, Esq. locations in Knoxville, Tennessee, created "Dolph Brown's Seafood Galley", a menu that featured over 30 "fresh and breaded seafood dishes" as additional items. His additions included the "Boatload of Fresh 'Tennessee Fried' Channel catfish", oysters, scallops, fresh "miniature lobster tails", rainbow trout, trout almondine, crab rolls, deviled crab, halibut steak, stuffed shrimp, red snapper, Bavarian beef burger, Bavarian pork cutlet sandwich", an "Old English" fish sandwich and a filet of Florida flounder dinner (with fries, hushpuppies and cole slaw). By June 1972, Brown had abandoned the H. Salt Esq. format and renamed his five stores "Dolph Brown's Big 3 Self-Service Restaurants", offering "crispy chicken", "giant steakburgers" and the "seafood galley" which now included "oyster and shrimp cocktails".

In 1973, moving further away from the H. Salt, Esq. fish and chips format, KFC began developing a corporate "H. Salt Seafood Galley" concept, opening a test store in Pittsburgh, Pennsylvania. The new concept was described as "quick-service restaurants specializing in H. Salt Fish & Chips and a variety of other seafood". The new stores were larger at 2,400 square feet, offering seating for 90 diners as well as takeout.

By the summer of 1975, KFC was operating eight test galleys and started to sell franchises for the galley-style restaurant. In 1976, KFC sold 150 H. Salt Seafood Galley franchises.

=== Menu expanded beyond original "fish and chips" concept ===
KFC changed the brand's marketing slogan to "Because you know your fish, shrimp, clams, scallops!" The menu included fried oysters and "seafood cakes", batter-fried vegetables, mushrooms and hushpuppies. Battered, fried shrimp and pineapple chunks on skewers, boiled shrimp, and shrimp salads were also heavily promoted.

KFC continued to move away from a focused fish and chips concept, adding many different menu items. In 1976, "finger steaks", batter-fried strips of beef served with cole slaw, onion rings, and chips were added to the menu. In 1977, KFC dropped the word "chips" from H. Salt Seafood Galley advertising, instead calling them "fries". Print advertising started to mention "light, fluffy rolls" as part of the menu.

=== The "Fish-Ka-Bob" ===
In 1977, KFC developed the "Fish-Ka-Bob", a new menu item that featured "chunks of tender fish, sweet onion, green pepper, luscious, juicy pineapple" all dipped in a "mouth-watering batter", fried and served on a wood skewer. It was described as "the most delightful new seafood taste you've ever known".

== KFC sells "H. Salt" properties ==
In 1980, then KFC CEO Michael A. Miles sold the H. Salt Seafood Galley restaurants owned by KFC as part of his "back-to-basics" program aimed to redefine and rebuild the faltering Kentucky Fried Chicken brand.

In 1987, KFC cut all ties to the H. Salt brand, turning over the 70 remaining franchised stores in California to the 60 west coast franchisees.

== Current locations ==
As of February 2024 there are 26 individually owned "H. Salt Fish and Chips" restaurants scattered throughout California, including 16 stores in the Greater Los Angeles area, as well as a few stand alone stores in Orange, Sacramento, San Bernardino & San Jose, California. Many of the locations have their own website. These stores have no relationship to the original franchised company.

== See also ==
- List of seafood restaurants
