= Sammy Salt =

English footballer

Personal information
- Full name: Samuel John Salt
- Date of birth: 30 December 1938
- Place of birth: Southport, England
- Date of death: 18 May 1999 (aged 60)
- Place of death: Poulton-le-Fylde, England
- Position: Left half

Youth career
- Blackpool

Senior career*
Years	Team	Apps	(Gls)
1956–1961	Blackpool	18	(0)
1961–1962	Cambridge City		
1962–1965	Chelmsford City		
- Wellington Town
- * Club domestic league appearances and goals

Samuel John Salt (30 December 1938 – 18 May 1999) was an English footballer who played as a left half.

== Career ==
Salt began his career at Blackpool, signing his first professional contract with the club in January 1956, after playing for their youth teams. On 10 September 1960, Salt made his Blackpool debut, starting in a 1–0 loss against Bolton Wanderers. Salt would go on to make 17 further league appearances in the 1960–61 Football League First Division as Blackpool finished 20th, narrowly avoiding relegation.

In the summer of 1961, Salt dropped into non-league football, signing for Southern League side Cambridge City. The following season, Salt signed for Southern League rivals Chelmsford City. In 1965, Salt signed for Wellington Town.
