= William Salt =

British banker

William Salt FSA MRSL
- Born: 29 October 1808; Russell Square, London, England
- Died: 6 December 1863 (aged 55); Park Square, Regent's Park
- Monuments: William Salt Library
- Occupation: Banker
- Parent: John Stevenson Salt
- Relatives: Sir Thomas Salt Bt. (nephew)

William Salt (29 October 1808 – 6 December 1863) was a British banker in London, England, and a genealogist and antiquary in whose memory the William Salt Library in Stafford was founded.

== Life ==
Salt's father, John Stevenson Salt (High Sheriff of Staffordshire in 1838), married Sarah Stevenson, the granddaughter of John Stevenson, founder in 1737 of a banking company in Stafford. The firm, Stevenson Salt & Co, had opened in Cheapside, London, in 1788 and in 1867 merged with Bosanquet & Co and later with Lloyds Banking Company.

His nephew was Sir Thomas Salt Bt. of Standon, near Eccleshall, Staffordshire.

== Collections and legacy ==
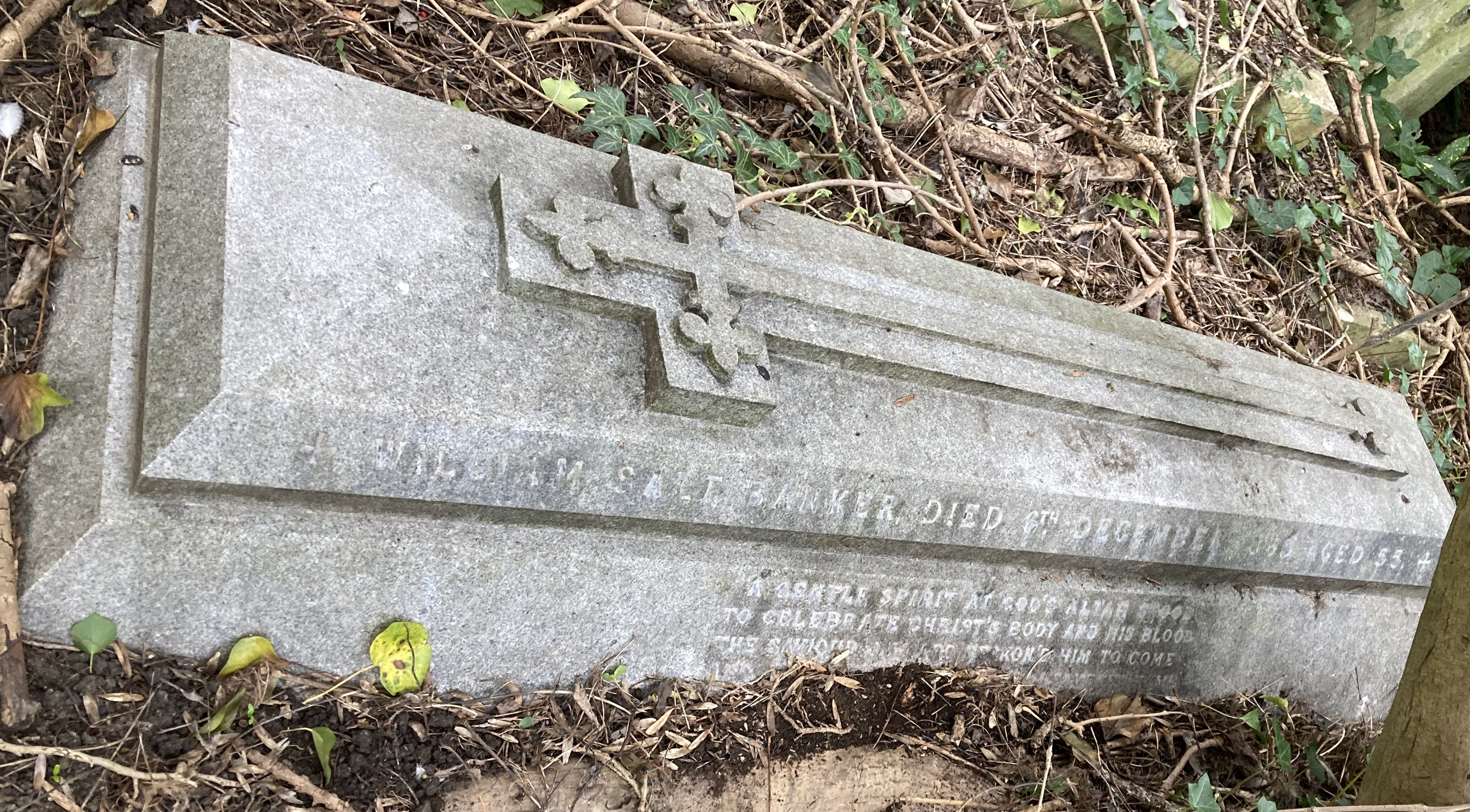
Grave of William Salt in Highgate Cemetery

Salt was an avid collector of topographical and genealogical books and records, particularly those relating to Staffordshire. After his death his extensive collection was catalogued and donated to the County of Stafford, which financed the opening in 1872 of the William Salt Library in Market Square, Stafford.

He was also commemorated in the name of the William Salt Archaeological Society, founded in 1879 as a text publication society to publish local and national documents relating to the history of Staffordshire. The society changed its name in 1936 to the Staffordshire Record Society.

He died on 6 December 1863 and is buried in Highgate Cemetery.
