= Agnes Pochin =

British women's rights campaigner

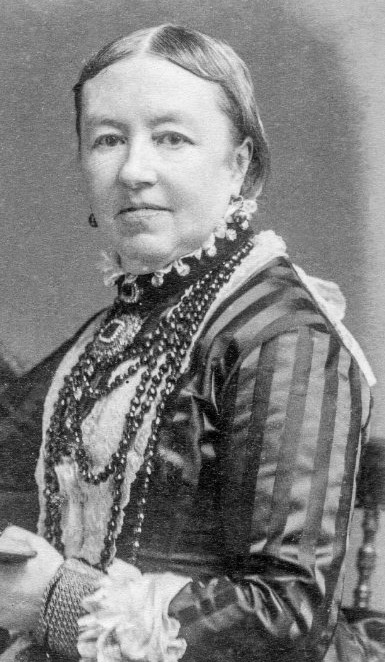
- Born: Agnes Heap; 1825; Timperley, Cheshire, England
- Died: 1908 (aged 82–83); Llanrwst, Clwyd, Wales
- Other name: Mrs Henry Davis Pochin Justitia (Pen Name)
- Known for: Early advocate for women's suffrage
- Spouse: Henry Davis Pochin
- Children: three survived infancy, including Laura McLaren, Baroness Aberconway
- Parent(s): George Gretton Heap; Hannah Lord. M. 1813 Rochdale

Agnes Pochin (née Heap; 1825 – 1908) was an early British campaigner for women's rights. She funded campaigns, wrote one of the first tracts and was one of the three speakers at the first suffrage meeting in Manchester.

== Life ==
Agnes Heap was born in 1825 at Timperley, near Manchester. Her sister was married to the chemist James Woolley and she married his business partner Henry Pochin. The marriage took place at the Unitarian Cross Street Chapel in Manchester in 1852.

Pochin wrote in 1855 a frequently overlooked work. John Chapman published her work titled "The Right of Women to Exercise the Elective Franchise". She argues for not only equal voting rights but also equality with respect to education, divorce, ambition or social aspiration. She wrote that "Women's life in the middle classes is, and has been rendered a dull one". It was signed "Justitia", and it was not published under her name until 1873. In 1858 Pochin unsuccessfully tried to get John Bright to introduce a women's right to vote clause into his Reform Bill. Bright could see no reason to oppose such a move personally but he thought that including this clause might jeopardise the bill. From 1866 to 1868, her husband was Mayor of Salford.

== The start of the suffrage campaign ==
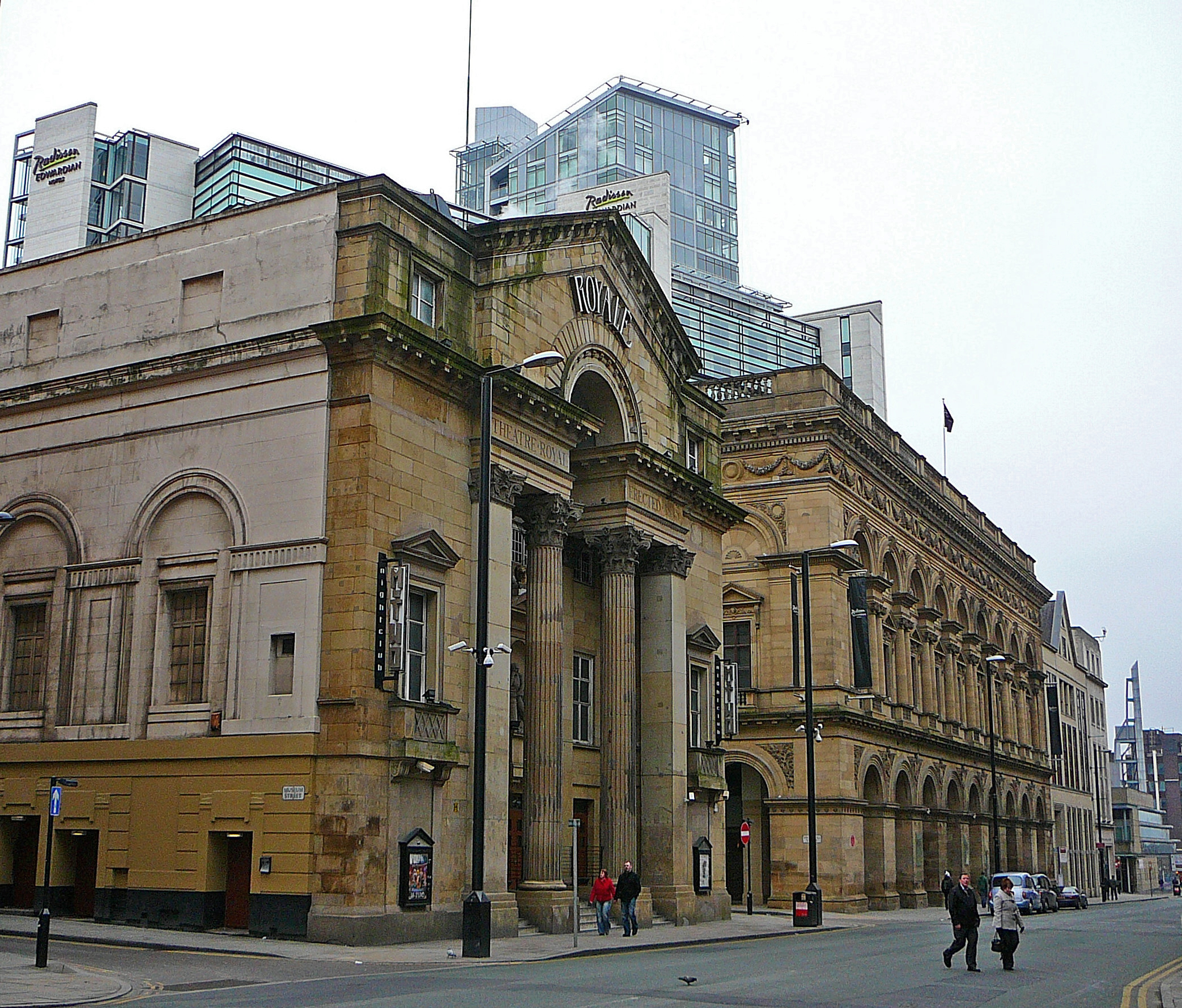
The (former) Free Trade Hall in Manchester

On 14 April 1868 the Manchester National Society for Women's Suffrage which had been formed the year before held its first public meeting. This meeting is one of the milestones that mark the start of the campaign for women's suffrage. The meeting was at the Free Trade Hall in Manchester and the three main speakers were Lydia Becker, Anne Robinson and Agnes Pochin. Pochin's husband who was the Mayor of Salford chaired the meeting. Pochin was criticised for leaving her children, but it is suspected that her daughter, Lydia, was present at the meeting. She would have seen her mother propose the second motion that called on the audience to support the proposal that women who were legally qualified should enter their names on the electoral register.

In 1870 Pochin and her husband moved south in order that her husband could travel more easily to the House of Commons. The Pochins still paid for a survey of Salford women and as a result over a thousand women were added to the voting register. Moreover, the Pochins paid for legal defence when the legality of this approach was challenged. In 1872 Agnes became a member of the executive Central Committee for Women's Suffrage. Her husband addressed the committee and he expressed the opinion that the committees meeting would mark a turning point in history. In 1873 her call for the women's suffrage was republished at last with non-de-plume but with the name of "Mrs Henry Davis Pochin". Over the next few years the central and Manchester committees received large sums from the Pochins. Pochin moved on to the Women's Emancipation Union in 1892 and over the next decade she made donations to local and national committees.

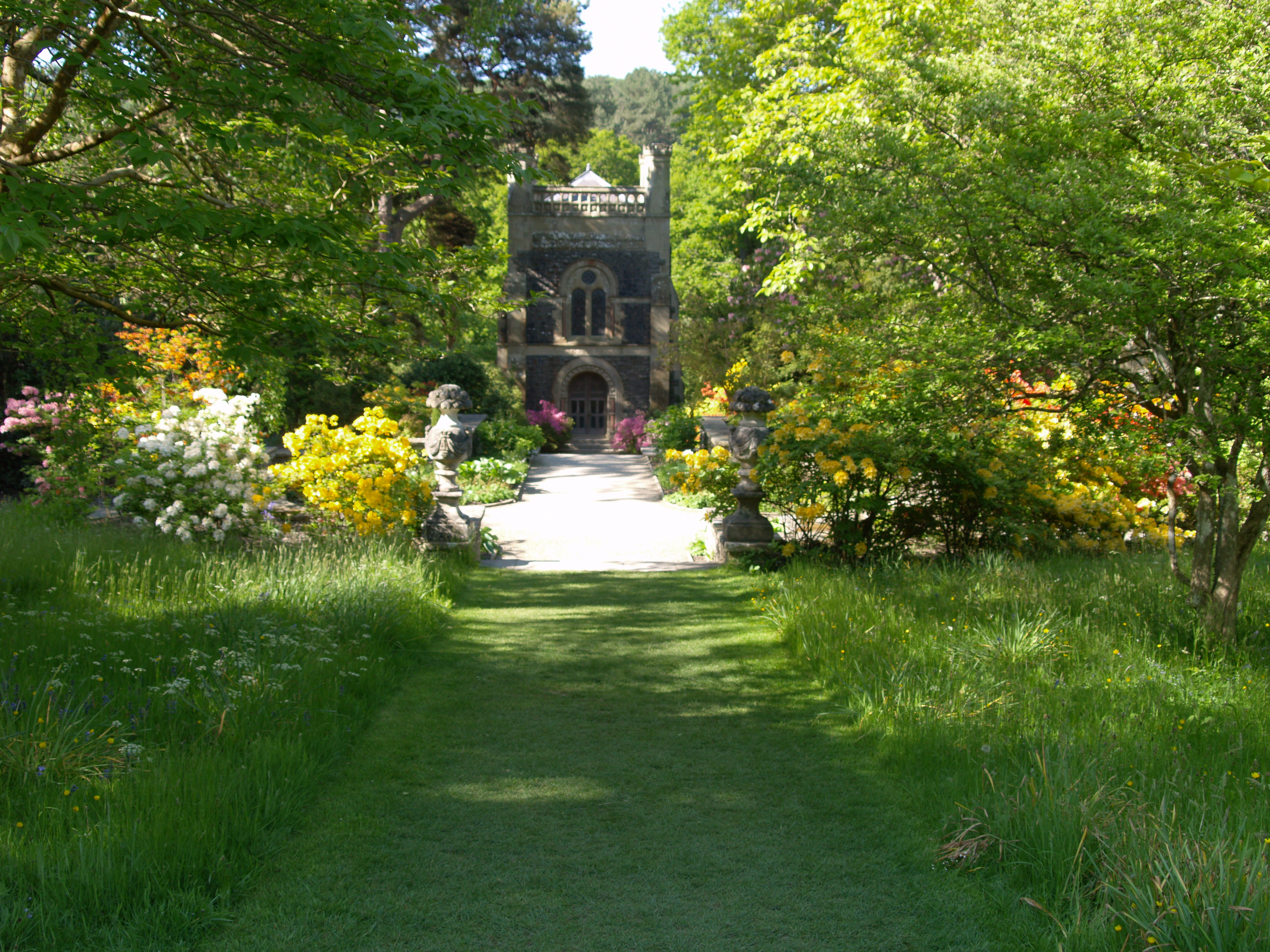
The Poem at Bodnant Garden

In 1892 Pochin was given the honour of launching the battleship HMS Revenge. She took the opportunity to challenge the church's historical poor regard for women.

Pochin died in 1908 and she was buried in the mausoleum known as "the POEM" in the grounds of Bodnant Hall, where she had lived since 1874 in the Conwy valley.

== Posthumous recognition ==
Her name and picture (and those of 58 other women's suffrage supporters) are on the plinth of the statue of Millicent Fawcett in Parliament Square, London, unveiled in 2018.
