= Barbara Salt =

British diplomat

Dame Barbara Salt DBE
- Born: 30 September 1904; Oroville, California, US
- Died: 28 December 1975 (aged 71); London, England
- Occupation: Diplomat

Dame Barbara Salt, DBE (30 September 1904 – 28 December 1975) was a British diplomat.

Salt was born in Oroville, California to Reginald Salt, an English banker and his wife, Maud, who returned to England not long after her birth. She was the granddaughter of banker and politician Sir Thomas Salt. She grew up in Oxford and Seaford, Sussex and was educated at universities in Munich and Cologne.

Salt was the first British woman in the Diplomatic Service to become Counsellor, Minister and Ambassador-Designate. She was appointed Ambassador to Israel in 1962, the first such post to go to a woman. Due to a serious illness, which resulted in the amputation of both of her legs, she was unable to take up the post. She spent time in Morocco, the former USSR, and Switzerland in official capacities.

She was appointed Member of the Order of the British Empire (MBE) in 1946, Commander of the Order of the British Empire (CBE) in 1959, and Dame Commander of the Order of the British Empire (DBE) in 1963.

She retired in 1973 and died at her home in London, aged 71, on 28 December 1975.
