= Henry Pochin =

British industrial chemist

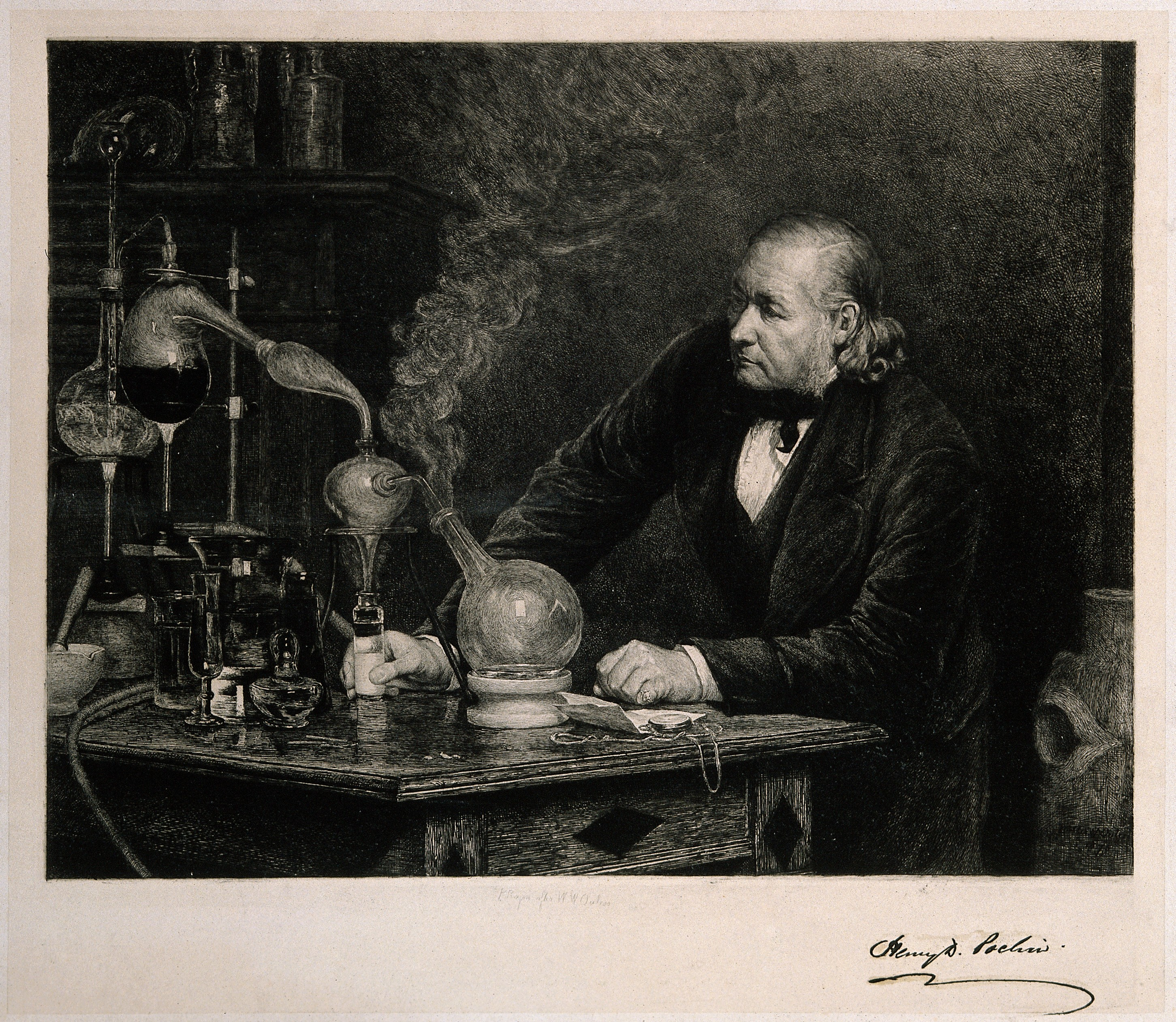
- Etching by P. A. Rajon after W. W. Ouless
- Born: Henry Davis Pochin; 25 May 1824; Wigston, Leicestershire
- Died: 28 August 1895 (aged 71)
- Occupations: Chemist and industrialist
- Political party: Liberal
- Spouse: Agnes Heap
- Children: three survived infancy (of whom Laura)

Henry Davis Pochin (25 May 1824 – 28 August 1895) was a British industrial chemist. He invented a process that enabled white soap to be made and a means of using china clay to create better quality paper. He owned several china clay pits in Cornwall, and a mine at Tredegar in South Wales, and was briefly a Liberal Member of Parliament. His wife was Agnes Pochin who was a leading suffragist.

== Life ==
Pochin was born on 25 May 1824 in Wigston. He was the son of a yeoman farmer of Leicestershire who served an apprenticeship to James Woolley (1811–1858), a manufacturing chemist in Manchester. In 1852 he married Agnes Heap (the sister of Woolley's wife) at the Unitarian Church in Manchester. In time Pochin became James Woolley's partner. Woolley died in 1858 and Pochin kept a manuscript diary of the illness, treatment and death of his partner. On Woolley's death Pochin became the sole proprietor.

Pochin is noted for two important inventions. Firstly, he developed a process for the clarification of rosin, a brown substance used to make soap, by passing steam through it so that after distillation it came out white, thus enabling the production of white soap. He sold the rights to this process to raise money to exploit his second invention, which was a process using ammonium sulfate and alumina as a low cost alternative to alumstone in the production of alum cake used in the manufacture of paper.

The process required china clay, and Pochin bought several china clay mines in Cornwall for this purpose. In time H. D. Pochin & Co. became one of the three largest British producers of china clay until they were acquired in 1932 by the English China Clays along with the second largest producer, Lovering, to form English China Clays Lovering Pochin & Co. Ltd (ECLP), with both Lovering and Pochin remaining shareholders.

Pochin's principal china clay works was the Gothers drying complex, near Roche, Cornwall. This consisted of a number of kilns, each served by a narrow gauge tramway, and was considered to be an extensive works in its day. The tramway was known simply as Pochin's Tramway, and ran from the Gothers works, across the Goss Moor to a loading wharf on the St Dennis Branch. The tramway was operated by a small fleet of steam locomotives known as "Pochin's Puffing Billies", carrying clay to the wharf in crude three plank wagons. Upon reaching the wharf, the clay would be loaded into standard gauge wagons. Coal for firing the kilns was transferred from standard gauge wagons into the narrow gauge tramway wagons for the return journey, the wagons were then cleaned of coal dust at Gothers before being loaded with clay for another trip. Because the crude tramway wagons had no braking mechanism, the train operators developed a novel solution that involved jamming a piece of timber between the spokes of the wheels while the train was in motion.

Between 1863 and 1867, Alderman Pochin led a consortium of Manchester business men in the formation of a number of companies in the iron, steel and coal industries. The first of these, the Staveley Coal and Iron Company Limited, was also the first to be formed by David Chadwick (1821–1885) a Manchester accountant whose accounting methods in relation to capitalisation and depreciation have attracted interest even 100 years or more later.

Pochin was elected to the Parliament of the United Kingdom in 1868 as one of two members of parliament for Stafford. He also held public office at times as a Deputy Lieutenant, Justice of the Peace and for two years, 1866–8, Mayor of Salford.

Henry Pochin was a director of the Tredegar Iron and Coal Company, that sunk two shafts (North and South) at Pochin Colliery, Tredegar, in 1876 to a depth of 340 yards (310 m); the first coal was brought to the surface in 1881. The mine was named after Pochin's daughter, Laura, who later married Charles McLaren, the Tredegar Company chairman later created first Baron Aberconway.

Between 1871 and 1876 Henry Pochin had a residence in Llandudno, North Wales at Haulfre, on the south facing landward side of the Great Orme where he was able to pursue his passion for gardening in an extensive and steeply terraced garden that since 1929 has been under the care of the local authority and is freely open to the public.

In 1874 Pochin bought the Bodnant estate at Tal-y-Cafn in the Conwy Valley comprising 25 farms with the Bodnant House and over 80 acres (32 ha) of garden where he lived in active retirement. At Bodnant, Pochin realised the superb qualities of the Dell through which the estate river ran and after first strengthening the banks to deter erosion he set about planting with great American and Oriental conifers. The development of the garden was continued by Pochin's daughter Laura McLaren, Baroness Aberconway, who married Charles McLaren, 1st Baron Aberconway. In 1949, Bodnant Garden was given to the National Trust.

Parliament of the United Kingdom
| Preceded by Michael Bass; Walter Meller | Member of Parliament for Stafford; 1868–1869; With: Walter Meller | Succeeded by Thomas Salt; Reginald Talbot |
