= Harold Salt (British Army officer) =

British Army officer (1879–1971)

Major-General Harold Salt CB CMG DSO
- Born: 30 December 1879; Weeping Cross, Stafford
- Died: 10 August 1971 (aged 91); Battle, Sussex
- Military career
- Allegiance: United Kingdom
- Branch: British Army
- Service years: 1900–1939
- Rank: Major-General
- Commands: Commander of the Territorial Army Air Defence Formations
- Conflicts: First World War
- Awards: Companion of the Order of the Bath, Companion of the Order of St Michael and St George, Distinguished Service Order, Croix de guerre, Mentioned in Dispatches

Major-General Harold Francis Salt CB CMG DSO (30 December 1879 – 10 August 1971) was a senior British Army officer.

Salt was the son of Thomas Salt and Mary Anderdon. He was commissioned into the Royal Regiment of Artillery in 1900. He served in the First World War, being promoted to Brigade Major in March 1915. His appointments as a Staff Officer saw him deployed on a variety of fronts, such as the Western Front, Gallipoli, Salonika, Palestine and Syria. He finished the war with the temporary rank of Brigadier-General. He was awarded the Distinguished Service Order in 1918 and made a Companion of the Order of St Michael and St George in 1919.

He was Assistant Commandant at the Royal Military Academy, Woolwich between 1925 and 1929, Commander Royal Artillery in the 54th (East Anglian) Infantry Division between 1930 and 1931, and Commander of the Territorial Army Air Defence Formations from 1931 to 1935. He was made a Companion of the Order of the Bath in 1932. He subsequently held military appointments in India until his retirement in April 1939.

Salt married Phyllis Dulce Cameron on 5 August 1914, and together they had one child.
