= Harriet Angelina Fortescue =

British writer

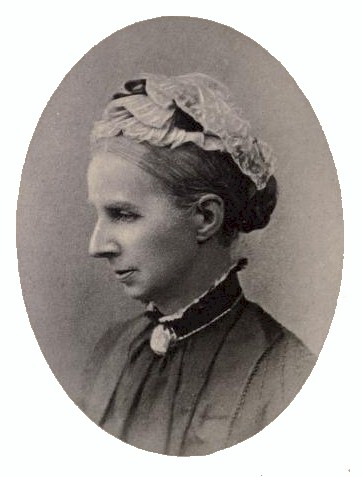
Harriet Angelina Fortescue

Harriet Angelina Fortescue (1825 – 1889) was a British writer on international affairs.

She was the wife of diplomat David Urquhart and wrote numerous articles in his publication, the Diplomatic Review, under the signature of Caritas. A Memoir of Mrs. Urquhart (1897) was written by Maria Catherine Bishop.

== Her work with David Urquhart ==
For some time before her marriage to Urquhart she had helped him with his political writing. After their marriage she was indispensable as author and organiser, both of his political work in the running of his Foreign Affairs Committees, and in the promulgation of the so-called Turkish bath. This, in conjunction with Dr Richard Barter, he introduced into the British Isles in 1856.
