= John Stevenson Salt =

- Born: 25 June 1775; England
- Died: 16 August 1845 (aged 70); Russell Square, London
- Occupations: Barrister; Banker; Land owner; High Sheriff of Staffordshire (1838)
- Children: Ten, including William Salt
- Relatives: Sir Thomas Salt Bt. MP (grandson)

John Stevenson Salt (25 June 1775 – 16 August 1845) was an English barrister, banker and land owner.

He was born in June 1775, the son of Thomas Salt (died 1788) of Rugeley, Staffordshire and Elizabeth Stevenson. He was baptised 7 August 1775 in Aston, Warwickshire.

He married in 1800 Sarah Stevenson, granddaughter of William Stevenson, founder in 1737 of Stevenson's Bank in Stafford. The bank was established at Cheapside, London in 1788. Salt became a partner in the bank, which in 1801 was renamed Stevenson and Salt. In 1867 it merged with Bosanquet & Co and later with Lloyds Banking Company.

He owned estates at Weeping Cross, Stafford where in 1813 he built the White House, and at Standon Hall, Staffordshire. He served as High Sheriff of Staffordshire in 1838.

His ten children included:

- Thomas Salt (b 1791) his heir, who replaced the White House with a new mansion, Baswich House, built in 1850 (and demolished in March 2009). His son was Sir Thomas Salt Bt. MP.
- William Salt (1808–1863), banker and antiquarian, after whom the William Salt Library at Stafford is named.
- Rev Joseph Salt (1810–1862), Rector of Standon, Staffordshire from 1845.

Honorary titles
Preceded by George Thomas Whitgreave	High Sheriff of Staffordshire; 1838	Succeeded by William Moore
