= Thomas Salt =

British banker and politician

Sir Thomas Salt Bt
- Born: 12 May 1830
- Died: 8 April 1904 (aged 73)
- Occupations: Banker; Politician
- Organization: Conservative Party
- Relatives: John Stevenson Salt (grandfather); William Salt (uncle); Dame Barbara Salt, DBE (granddaughter)

Sir Thomas Salt, 1st Baronet (12 May 1830 – 8 April 1904), was a British banker and Conservative politician.

== Career ==
His grandfather John Stevenson Salt, (High Sheriff of Staffordshire in 1838), married Sarah Stevenson, the granddaughter of John Stevenson, founder in 1737 of a banking company in Stafford. Salt became a partner in the firm of Stevenson Salt & Co which had opened in Cheapside, London in 1788 and which in 1867 merged with Bosanquet & Co and later with Lloyds Banking Company. Salt went on to be a director, and later chairman, of Lloyds from 1884 to 1896. He was also chairman, from 1883 to 1904, of the North Staffordshire Railway. He was also chair of the New Zealand Midland Railway Company in 1889.

He was returned to Parliament for Stafford in 1859, a seat he held until 1865, and again from 1869 to 1880, 1881 to 1885 and 1886 to 1892. From January 1876 to April 1880, he was Parliamentary Secretary to the Local Government Board, a junior post, in the second ministry of Benjamin Disraeli's government. In 1899 he was created a Baronet, of Standon, and of Weeping Cross in the County of Stafford. His estates included Baswich House, built by his father in 1850, and Standon Hall, which his son later rebuilt in 1901. He died in April 1904, aged 73.

== Personal life ==
His youngest son was a major-general in the army, and his uncle was the banker William Salt, after whom the William Salt Library at Stafford is named. His granddaughter was the diplomat Dame Barbara Salt, DBE .

== Arms ==
Coat of arms of Thomas Salt
| Crest Three annulets interlaced Sable thereon a dove holding in the beak an olive branch Proper and charged on the neck with a chevron also Sable. Escutcheon Argent a chevron rompu between three mullets in chief and a lion rampant in base Sable. Motto In Sale Salus |

== Notes ==
Parliament of the United Kingdom
| Preceded by John Ayshford Wise; Viscount Ingestre | Member of Parliament for Stafford; 1859–1865; With: John Ayshford Wise 1859–1860; Thomas Sidney 1860–1865 | Succeeded by Michael Bass; Walter Meller |
| Preceded by Walter Meller; Henry Pochin | Member of Parliament for Stafford; 1869–1880; With: Reginald Talbot 1869–1874; Alexander Macdonald 1874–1880 | Succeeded by Alexander Macdonald; Charles McLaren |
| Preceded by Alexander Macdonald; Charles McLaren | Member of Parliament for Stafford; 1881–1885; Served alongside: Charles McLaren | Succeeded by Charles McLaren (representation reduced to one member 1885) |
| Preceded by Charles McLaren | Member of Parliament for Stafford; 1886–1892 | Succeeded by Charles Shaw |
Political offices
| Preceded by Clare Sewell Read | Parliamentary Secretary to the Local Government Board; 1876–1880 | Succeeded by John Tomlinson Hibbert |
Church of England titles
| Preceded by George Cubitt | Second Church Estates Commissioner; 1879–1800 | Succeeded by Evelyn Ashley |
Baronetage of the United Kingdom
| New creation | Baronet (of Standon and Weeping Cross); 1899–1904 | Succeeded by Thomas Anderson Salt |
