= Haddon Salt =

American entrepreneur and businessman

- Born: Haddon Norman Salt; October 18, 1928 (age 97); Stanfree, Derbyshire, England
- Occupations: Businessman; entrepreneur; musician; restaurateur
- Board member of: H. Salt Esq. Fish & Chips (founder); Kentucky Fried Chicken

Haddon Norman Salt (born 18 October 1928) is a British–American businessman, best known for founding the fast food chain H. Salt Esq. Fish & Chips and for acting as that company's brand ambassador, spokesman, and symbol. Salt followed his father and grandfather's careers, becoming a master fish cook and purveyor of fish and chips.

"I came over not simply to start a restaurant, but to introduce America to fish and chips, as grandiose as that dream sounds now". When Salt arrived in America in 1964, Britons ate an average of 100 pounds of fish per year, while Americans ate only 10 pounds per year. Salt said, "The way some of it is handled, I can see why".

Salt opened his first fish and chips shop in California in 1965. His business was acquired by the Kentucky Fried Chicken corporation in 1969. The sale made Salt the third largest stockholder in KFC, at the time the world's largest fast-food company.

KFC was not successful in the large-scale expansion of the H. Salt Esq. chain and sold the brand and business in 1972. Salt explained the brand's failure, saying "They started lowering the standards of the quality of the fish, and so the [sales] volumes of the restaurants went down and people stopped buying franchises, so that was the end of it. And it didn't grow anymore".

Salt left the company in 1972.

== Early life ==
Salt was born October 18, 1928, in Stanfree, Derbyshire, England, the only child to Charles Haddon and May (née London) Salt. Diagnosed with a terminal ailment at eight years old, doctors said nothing could be done. In 2016, Salt said "My parents turned to Christian Science and its primitive healing philosophy by which you could measure the outcome. Now at 88 and healthy, I look at Christianity from a scientific viewpoint."

Salt attended a private school in England. At 16, he worked at "Salt's Sea Fresh", his father's fish and chip store at the family's seaside resort in Skegness, Lincolnshire, England where he saw enthusiastic acceptance and demand for fish and chips from United States Air Force airmen stationed at nearby RAF East Kirkby station. He spent two years in the Royal Navy. Salt married Grace Lawson in 1949 and the couple emigrated to Canada with $37. After three years and a series of odd jobs, they returned to Skegness where Salt went back to work, helping at his father's fish and chips shop.

== Emigration from Great Britain ==
In 1960, Salt purchased a restaurant in England, sold it in 1964, and emigrated with his wife and three children to California with $10,000. "I decided to bring the business here because all the tourists told me if they had fish and chips in America like I cooked them, I'd have a great business". "Frankly, our family and friends thought my wife Grace and I a bit daft to chuck it all for a dream".

== Fish and chips career in America ==
Salt entered the restaurant business in America, first purchasing the Griddle, an existing 24-hour diner located at Fourth and Tamalpais in San Rafael, California in November 1964. Salt sold the Griddle diner in San Rafael in January 1966.

=== Fish and chips store expansion ===
Salt next opened "Salt's English Fish & Chips Shop", initially offering "take home" service at 813 Bridgeway in Sausalito, California in August 1965.

Salt's wife Grace managed their first fish and chip shop in Sausalito, while Salt opened another store in Berkeley. It was reported that the Salts planned "to establish a number of franchised shops in various locations throughout the Bay Area and perhaps even more extensively". By 1966, the Sausalito store was selling fish and chips in a checked paper basket and encouraging customers to "eat fish as you walk along... very common in England".

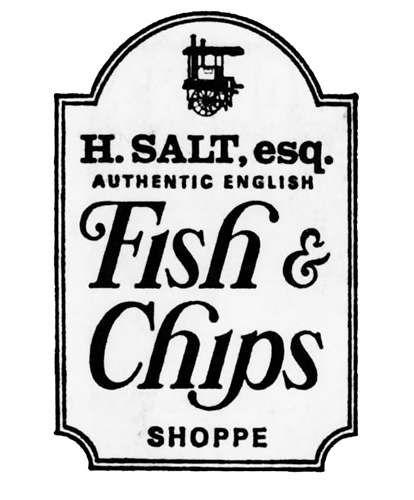
H. Salt, esq. Authentic English Fish & Chips Shoppe logo c. 1967

By 1967, Salt owned two more fish and chips stores, one in Sunnyvale and one in Santa Cruz. They were now named "H. Salt, esq. Authentic English Fish and Chips Shoppe".

=== Sales plan for fish frying ranges ===
Salt was the sole United States and Canadian sales agent for Henry Nuttall fish and chip frying ranges and related equipment. Salt specified Nuttall equipment for his franchised fish and chip stores. Salt often referred to the brand during news interviews. "...I believe you must have the proper cooking equipment. We insist on special stoves to get the heat up properly and even enough to turn out decent fish and chips. We import our stoves from Henry Nuttall in Britain, a master at the art of making frying ranges". The Nuttall ranges used by Salt were 18 feet long and had glass fronts so patrons could watch their orders being cooked. Salt said the ranges were "the heart of the operation".

== Growth from franchised stores ==
When Salt sold his first franchise store in San Rafael, he was negotiating the sale of three additional franchises in Menlo Park, San Jose, and Walnut Creek. Salt had settled on "that fertile field of franchises – Southern California".

By October 1968, there were 45 H. Salt, Esq. locations in Southern California. 44 of those were franchised. 30 additional stores were under construction and a total of 100 were planned "before the end off the year". Salt was referred to as "president of the world's largest chain of fish and chips stores". The company also had offices in Los Angeles, California and Chicago, Illinois.

=== Unique interlocking franchise fees ===
An H. Salt Esq. franchise in 1968 cost approximately $22,000 (equivalent to $203,684 in 2025). A prospective franchisee had to have $10,000 to $12,000 in cash and could finance the rest. Salt reasoned "A man may walk away from a $5,000 investment if things get tough, but he probably has $10,000 only once in his life and he'll fight to protect it". The average H. Salt Esq. store at the time made $100,000 per year and a franchisee netted an average of $25,000 annually before taxes.

However, Salt's franchise fee structure required more from a franchisee than a simple five percent franchise fee on gross sales. Salt pointed out that five percent would not cover his ongoing overhead. "We are spending more than five percent on marketing and promotion and we are marketing oriented". In addition to a franchise fee, Salt required franchisees to purchase all of their raw products and equipment from him. He said "After all, franchising is just distributing", and he pointed out that his insistence on offering consistently high-quality food required the high-quality ingredients specified by him. A franchisee agreed to purchase everything their store needed from Salt.

=== Insistence on providing customers with both quality food and experience ===
Salt understood he was dealing with potential American customers who had little experience with fish and chips. He knew he had to offer the highest quality product and experience to convert the public. He said he "must be frank in stating that there might be a wait for an order simply because we fry on request to assure the product is piping hot which is the only way to enjoy fish and chips". Customer service was important to Salt as well. "We impress upon our proprietors the importance of genuinely caring for the interests of our customers".

=== Managed sources and quality of fish ===
Salt's stores used cod from Iceland and haddock from Boston, Massachusetts. He said "You need the frigid waters of the Atlantic to turn the trick. That's why we get our fish from Iceland". Salt hired Captain Ingolfur Moller as the chain's quality control coordinator who monitored the quality of the fish caught by the Icelandic fishing fleets. Salt said "the fish must be treated with loving care".

=== Training franchisees in the art of fish and chips ===
Salt spent "several weeks" training each owner at the outset of learning his franchise operation. "The making of fish and chips is really considered an art in Great Britain and we are determined it should remain an art in America". "It is a delicate product that must be made well or not at all". Salt's attention to detail extended to the kind and quality of malt vinegar he specified, Penistone Pure Malt Vinegar, brewed by British Vinegars in Penistone, England.

== Salt's marketing built awareness and demand ==
Salt quickly built a strong brand identity through his carefully crafted marketing. After branding the franchise using his identity, he immediately started using area newspaper and radio advertising to build awareness and demand for his fish and chips. Building on the British tradition of wrapping fish and chips in pages of newsprint, Salt used special food wrapping paper printed with London Times newspaper articles to give his orders a feeling of authenticity. Salt advertised his stores would accept "either British or American currency".

=== Naming the brand ===
When Salt decided to start franchising his fish and chips stores, marketing advisers suggested he use "a real English name such as 'British' or 'London', or 'Picadilly' or 'Old English'" to name his brand. He disagreed, saying "I turned thumbs down on the idea. In England, as you may know, a good shop carries the name of the merchant. A man who takes pride in the product he is offering the public and who personally stands behind it. It is not a matter of ego but of responsibility to your customers... Therefore, I insisted my name be on the sign".

=== "English" store design ===
Salt wanted his stores to remind American customers of England but made concessions in their design. "They [the shops] are 'English' to the point where it will not conflict with the food service Americans have come to expect. We even accept British and American currency, but we refuse to clutter them up". Service personnel behind the glass windowed store fryer counters wore uniforms that reminded customers of traditional British street vendors – red or white aprons, white caps, and vintage white maid's caps.

== Acquired by Kentucky Fried Chicken in 1969 ==
Salt had 129 franchised stores in operation with annualized sales "over $10 million" (equivalent to $87,794,918 in 2025) when Kentucky Fried Chicken offered him $12.5 million in KFC stock (equivalent to $109,743,648 in 2025) and a "joint agreement to open 200 units in seven states".

== Negotiating the sale of H. Salt. Esq. Fish & Chips ==
Salt discussed the reasons and process involved in his 1968 decision to sell his business to KFC in The New York Times film documentary The King of Fish and Chips:

We were opening stores everywhere. We eventually wound up with 500. We were growing so quickly. I realized how many components it would take to make this thing work, but only if you do it right. And that's the hard part... getting people to do it right. I admired KFC as the leading food company. They were ahead of McDonald's in those days. When they went public, every franchisee became a multi-millionaire. Within a year the company was worth 500 million [dollars], from two million [dollars].

Salt's company, Salt Enterprises, based in San Francisco, California would become "a wholly-owned subsidiary of KFC" and "receive an undisclosed amount of KFC common stock for all issued and outstanding capital stock of Salt Enterprises". KFC president and chief executive John Y. Brown Jr. said, "this is a sound step toward (KFC) diversification". The transaction made Salt the third-largest holder of KFC stock. At that time, KFC was the world's largest fast-food company.

When the deal was consummated, KFC said they planned to have 1,000 combined company-owned and franchised H. Salt Fish & Chips stores by 1973. KFC newspaper ads offered franchise opportunities, saying:

Haddon Salt, Esq., an urbane 41-year-old Englishman, who, with his Savile Row suits, trim bowler, and tightly furled umbrella, cuts the perfect figure of a proper English gentleman.

In the copy, Salt claimed, "I'll do for English fish and chips what the colonel did for chicken". Salt would "continue as president of the company, which will be a Kentucky Fried Chicken subsidiary" and "will perform a publicity role like other corporate figureheads".

== Aggressive franchise program begins, abruptly stops, restarts ==
KFC immediately started to change Salt's business model, The company began a series of confusing and contradictory changes to the fish and chips franchise operation, promoting franchises priced 450 percent higher than those sold by Salt, then abruptly buying back those franchises and just as quickly restarting a different franchise format.

=== KFC promotes H. Salt Esq. Fish & Chips franchise opportunities ===
In 1969, KFC heavily promoted H. Salt Esq. franchise opportunities in newspaper and magazine print ads. Comparing KFC's having built 2,400 units since 1957, the company claimed they had "invested capital in opening and operating over 400 [H.Salt Esq.] units in 18 markets". The ads promised franchisees would receive "the proven ingredients they need for profitable operation" with "management and operational guidance by the world's most experienced franchise operators, exclusive fish-fry equipment, a quality-controlled source of Icelandic filets, secret batter ingredients and expert training to make your employees master fish fryers". Current and former KFC franchisees were given "first crack" at purchasing H. Salt Esq. franchises.

=== KFC increased franchise fees by 450% ===
KFC increased the fee to franchise an H. Salt Esq. Fish & Chips store from $20,000 to $90,000 (equivalent to $790,154 in 2025). The first store to open under the terms of the new agreement was in Louisville, Kentucky. When an H. Salt Esq. store opened in Dayton, Ohio in November 1969, the store saw a first-day total of 2,300 orders of fish and chips.

=== Changes to store format and menu ===
In 1970 the footprint of the new H. Salt Esq. stores were expanded to include 34 seats. "We found that a lot of people like to sit down to eat, rather than carry out, so we will be taking this approach in the new units".

In 1971, KFC pared back additions to the H. Salt fish and chips menu. Salt said, "We tried shrimp... but it spoiled the taste of the fish". After Salt left the company in 1972, KFC once again added shrimp and other seafood to the H. Salt Fish & Chips menu.

=== Corporate buy-back of existing franchises ===
KFC quickly started a buy-back program of franchised H. Salt Esq. stores in late 1969, quickly purchasing previously franchised units. By November 1969, KFC owned 464 H. Salt Esq. outlets.

=== Franchises once again offered ===
One year later, KFC recommenced offering franchises for existing and new H. Salt Esq. locations. Salt was quoted as preferring franchised operations over the company store model. "The franchisee does a better job... We made a mistake with so many company stores, but that is changed".

== KFC acquired by Heublein ==
In July 1971, KFC president John Y. Brown sold the company to the Connecticut-based Heublein, a packaged food and liquor corporation, for $285 million (equivalent to $2,265,714,873 in 2025). The business model moving forward called for the closing or franchising of 168 H. Salt Esq. outlets. Salt's contract as "chairman of the fish and chips division" would be assumed by Hueblein according to the sale agreement.

=== "The Colonel's" store format offered H. Salt Fish & Chips ===
"The Colonel's", a new small-scale franchise store format initiated by KFC in 1971 was meant for communities of less than 10,000. The stores sold H. Salt Fish & Chips as well as Kentucky Fried Chicken, hamburgers, milkshakes, soft ice cream, and "tasty sandwiches created by Colonel Sanders".

== End of Salt's involvement with H. Salt Fish & Chips ==
=== Salt reflecting on his franchise's end ===
External videos
- Remarks by Haddon Salt, reflecting on his career as the founder and spokesperson of H. Salt Fish & Chips

"All my life, everything I touched turned to gold. Then suddenly, it went the other way. They weren't selling chicken, they were selling Colonel Sanders. They weren't selling fish, they were selling me. They really didn't grasp what the idea was. I was trying to get middle-class people into a business and give them the joy of self-employment. They [KFC] didn't get that. They worked on me big time, they didn't work on the company. They started lowering the standards of the quality of the fish, and so the (sales) volumes of the restaurants went down and people stopped buying franchises, so that was the end of it. And it didn't grow anymore. I don't feel responsible. I don't feel guilty. I did sell out".

== Other activities ==
=== Musician ===
Salt was an early musician, teaching himself the fiddle and the saxophone "for independence money". He felt he wasn't being paid enough while working for his father. He played "semi-professionally in dance bands from the age of 12" and was a member of the Royal Marines Band Service. He joined the Lake County (California) Symphony Orchestra in 1995, playing the violin. Salt owns and plays a Zeta Music Systems electric violin.

=== Cutting horse supporter and competitor ===
In the 1970s, Salt developed an interest in cutting horses, becoming a breeder, rider, and supporter of the breed and associated equine activities in California and across America. In 1971, Salt's quarter horse "Joe Duhan", ridden by Matlock Rose ranked fifth in the Open Horse category of that year's National Cutting Horse Association World Championship. Salt's horse "Joy Joe", ridden by NCHA Hall of Fame rider Leon Harrel was the 1974 winner of the National Cutting Horse Futurity.

Salt allowed various NCHA Championship competitions to be held on his 350-acre "H. Salt Esquire Ranch" in Sonoma, California. The ranch featured an indoor, full-size horse show arena. In 1974, a Pacific Coast Cutting Horse Association competition saw 20 of "the nation's top horses and riders" compete for a total of $20,000 (equivalent to $175,590 in 2025) in prize money.

=== Land developer ===
In 1975, Salt was president of Mirasol Corporation and a partner in Salt-Ballard Properties. Both businesses were involved in land development in San Rafael, California, and Mazatlan, Mexico.

=== Fish farming and conservation ===
Salt has had a continued interest in improving fish stocks through farming and conservation. In 1970 he said "It is difficult to order good fish in American restaurants". Salt suggested propagation practices in use at the time in Iceland would allow farming codfish "on a sustained yield basis". He also decried the practice of trawling codfish on long voyages saying the practice "impairs the flavor". Salt preferred the practice of line-caught fishing from smaller boats which allowed for faster freezing of a catch. In 1970, Salt said the fishing industry is "in deplorable condition" and was "dying". He helped establish and finance legislative lobby groups to help the industry. He created two "healthy and successful" fisheries, including Sea Fresh Fisheries, Inc. in 1978, based in Borrego Springs, California.

== Awards ==
1971 • Gold Medal – California State Exposition and Fair "for excellence in product". H. Salt Esq., Fish and Chips earned the award with a 98.8% rating of "Superior".
