= Jesse David Watts-Russell =

British politician (1812–1879)

Member of Parliament for North Staffordshire
- In office 5 July 1841 – 12 August 1847 Serving with Charles Adderley
- Preceded by: Bingham Baring; Edward Buller-Yarde-Buller
- Succeeded by: Charles Adderley; George Egerton

Personal details
- Born: 1812
- Died: 7 March 1879 (aged 66–67)
- Party: Conservative

Jesse David Watts-Russell (1812 – 7 March 1879) was a British Conservative politician.

He was the son of Jesse Watts-Russell, an MP for Gatton and Mary Watts, and married Mary Nevill Wright, daughter of John Smith Wright and Lydia Gray, and had at least nine children, including Josephine (died c. 1893).

Watts-Russell was elected Conservative MP for North Staffordshire at the 1841 general election, and held the seat until 1852 when he stood down.

He was also, at some point, a Justice of the Peace.

Parliament of the United Kingdom
Preceded by Bingham Baring; Edward Buller-Yarde-Buller	Member of Parliament for North Staffordshire; 1841–1847; With: Charles Adderley	Succeeded by Charles Adderley; George Egerton
