= Charles Chetwynd-Talbot =

Charles Chetwynd-Talbot may refer to:

- Charles Chetwynd-Talbot, 2nd Earl Talbot (1777–1849), British politician, Lord Lieutenant of Ireland
- Charles Chetwynd-Talbot, 19th Earl of Shrewsbury (1830–1877), British Conservative politician
- Charles Chetwynd-Talbot, 20th Earl of Shrewsbury (1860–1921), British peer and businessman
- Charles Chetwynd-Talbot, 22nd Earl of Shrewsbury (born 1952), English nobleman, Lord High Steward of Ireland
