= Ellen Chetwynd-Talbot, Countess of Shrewsbury =

The Right Honourable The Countess of Shrewsbury
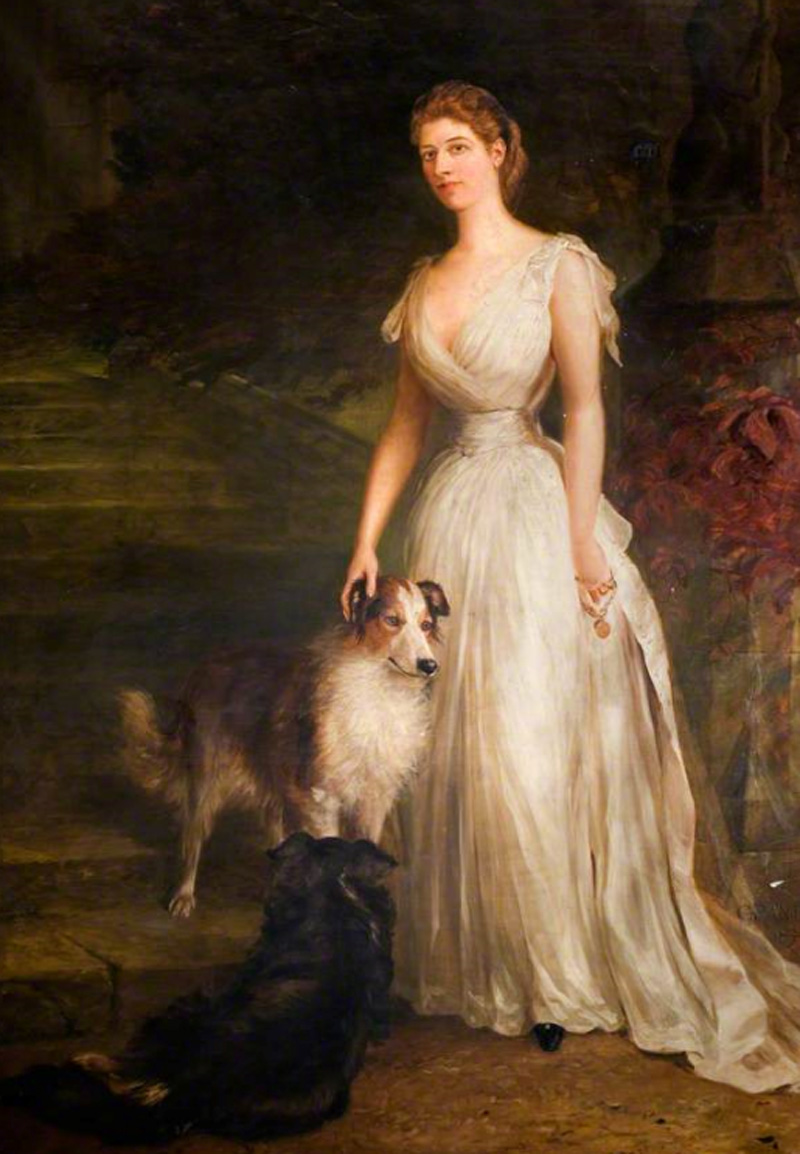
- Portrait of Lady Shrewsbury, 1894
- Born: Ellen Mary Palmer-Morewood; April 1856; Ladbroke Hall, Warwickshire
- Died: 23 August 1940 (aged 84)
- Spouse(s): Alfred Edward Miller Mundy (m. 1873; div. 1881) Charles Chetwynd-Talbot, 20th Earl of Shrewsbury (m. 1882; died 1921)
- Children: 3
- Parent(s): Charles Rowland Palmer-Morewood; Hon. Georgiana Byron
- Relatives: George Byron, 7th Baron Byron (grandfather); John Chetwynd-Talbot, 21st Earl of Shrewsbury (grandson)

Ellen Mary Chetwynd-Talbot, Countess of Shrewsbury (née Palmer-Morewood; April 1856 – 23 August 1940) was an English aristocrat.

== Early life ==
Ellen was the daughter of Charles Rowland Palmer-Morewood and Hon. Georgiana Byron. Her father, the Deputy Lieutenant of Warwickshire, lived at Alfreton Hall in Derbyshire, and at Ladbroke Hall, Warwickshire. Among her siblings were Georgiana Millicent Palmer-Morewood (wife of Samuel Allsopp, 2nd Baron Hindlip), Charles Rowland Palmer-Morewood (who married Patience Mary Hervey, a daughter of Rt. Rev. Lord Arthur Hervey).

Her paternal grandparents were William Palmer-Morewood and Clara Blois (the daughter of Sir Charles Blois, 6th Baronet). Her maternal grandparents were Adm. George Byron, 7th Baron Byron (cousin of the poet Lord Byron) and Elizabeth Mary Chandos-Pole (a daughter of Sacheverell Chandos-Pole of Radbourne Hall).

== Personal life ==
On 25 September 1873, she married Alfred Edward Miller Mundy of Shipley Hall, son of Alfred Miller Mundy and Jane Hindmarsh (eldest daughter of John Hindmarsh). Before they divorced, they were the parents of:

- Evelyn Hester Mundy (1874–1947), who married Capt. Hugh Robert Edward Harrison, a Welsh first-class cricketer and British Army officer, in 1898. They divorced in January 1909, and she married Francis Annesley, 6th Earl Annesley, son of Lt.-Col. Hugh Annesley, 5th Earl Annesley and Mabel Wilhelmina Frances Markham, on 14 February 1909. He was killed near Diksmuide, Belgium in November 1914 during World War I. After his death, she married Guy Aylwin on 15 May 1919.

After their divorce, Alfred married Catherine Louisa Cradock-Hartopp, daughter of Sir John Cradock-Hartopp, 4th Baronet on 14 June 1883.

=== Second marriage ===
On 21 June 1882, she eloped to marry the 19 year-old Charles Henry John Chetwynd-Talbot, 20th Earl of Shrewsbury, the only son and heir of Charles Chetwynd-Talbot, 19th Earl of Shrewsbury and Anna Theresa Cockerell. After her marriage, she was styled as Countess of Shrewsbury. Before his death, they were the parents of two children:

- Charles John Alton Chetwynd-Talbot, Viscount Ingestre (1882–1915), who was born less than three months after their marriage; he married Lady Winifred Constance Hester Paget, daughter of Lord Alexander Victor Paget and Hon. Hester Alice Stapleton-Cotton, in 1904.
- Nellie Viola Castlia Florence Chetwynd-Talbot (1885–1951), who married Commander Reginald Edward Gore, son of Lt.-Gen. Edward Arthur Gore, in 1907. They divorced in 1916 and she married Walter Arnold Conduitt, son of Henry Walter Conduitt, in August 1916.

Lord Shrewsbury died in 1921. As their only son died during her husband's lifetime, upon Lord Shrewsbury's death, the title passed to their grandson, The 21st Earl of Shrewsbury and 21st Earl of Waterford (the father of the current Earl). Lady Shrewsbury died on 23 August 1940.
