= Lord Norton =

Lord Norton may refer to:

- Baron Norton, a hereditary title in the Peerage of the United Kingdom created in 1878
  - Charles Adderley, 1st Baron Norton (1814–1905), British Conservative politician
- Philip Norton, Baron Norton of Louth (born 1951), British constitutional expert and Conservative peer
