= Countess of Shrewsbury =

Countess of Shrewsbury is a title used by the wife of the Earl of Shrewsbury.

Countess of Shrewsbury may refer to:

- Margaret Beauchamp, Countess of Shrewsbury, countess 1425–1467
- Anne Hastings, Countess of Shrewsbury, countess c.1481–1520
- Gertrude Talbot, Countess of Shrewsbury, countess 1539–1567
- Bess of Hardwick, countess 1568–1590
- Mary Talbot, Countess of Shrewsbury, countess 1590–1616
- Anna Maria Talbot, Countess of Shrewsbury, countess 1658–1668
- Ellen Chetwynd-Talbot, Countess of Shrewsbury, countess 1882–1921
- Nadine, Countess of Shrewsbury, countess 1936–1963
