= 1874 North Staffordshire by-election =

UK Parliamentary by-election

The 1874 North Staffordshire by-election was fought on 23 March 1874. The by-election was fought due to the incumbent Conservative MP, Charles Adderley, becoming President of the Board of Trade. It was retained by the incumbent.
