= Jesse Watts-Russell =

English landowner and politician; (1786–1875)

- Born: Jesse Russell; 6 May 1786
- Died: 26 March 1875 (aged 88)
- Education: Worcester College, Oxford
- Known for: Conservative MP for Gatton (1820–1826)
- Children: 9, including Jesse and John

Jesse Watts-Russell (6 May 1786 – 26 March 1875) was a landowner and Conservative MP for the rotten borough of Gatton in Surrey. In the 1800s, he came up with the concept of creating chalet-style houses in the style of a Swiss village; examples of his legacy can be seen in the village of Ilam in Staffordshire.

== Biography ==
Born Jesse Russell, he was the second son of Jesse Russell Sr. (1743–1820) from Newcastle-under-Lyme in Staffordshire, who had made his fortune as a soap manufacturer in the East End of London, and Elizabeth née Noble from Yorkshire. He graduated from Worcester College, Oxford, in 1808 with a B.A., followed by an M.A. in 1811, and was awarded a D.C.L. in 1819.

He was married three times. His first wife was Mary Watts, the daughter of David Pike Watts who was a wealthy wine merchant. The couple married in January 1811 and took on the new family name of Watts-Russell in 1817. They had eight children – four sons and four daughters. Their eldest son was Jesse David Watts-Russell, born in 1812, who became Conservative MP for North Staffordshire in 1841. Their youngest son was John Charles Watts-Russell, born in 1825, who emigrated to New Zealand in 1850 where he held a seat on the Legislative Council and became a successful sheep farmer.

The Watts-Russell family lived at the Ilam Park estate in the Peak District. The old hall had belonged to Mary's father, David Pike Watts, who died in 1816. The hall passed down to his daughter who was by then married to Jesse. He commissioned James Trubshaw to build a new hall in the Gothic Revival style, to the designs of the architect John Shaw. The new Ilam Hall (now a Grade II* listed building) was built between 1821 and 1826.

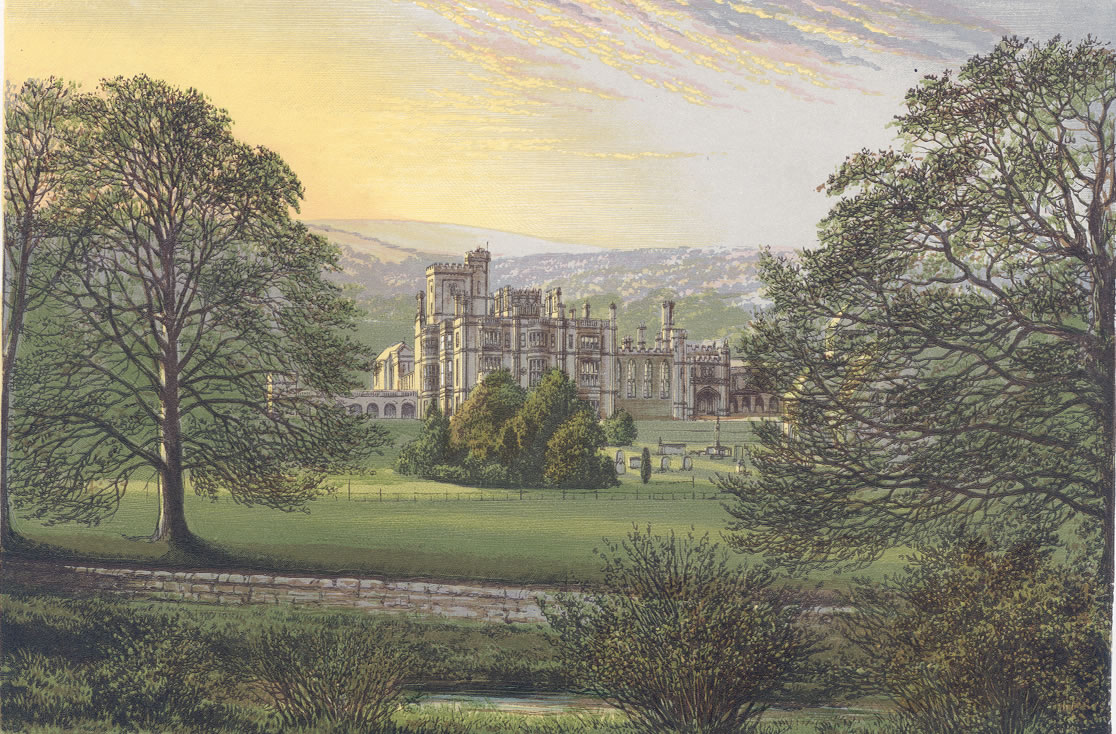
Ilam Hall circa 1880. Illustration from Morris's County Seats of The Noblemen and Gentlemen of Great Britain and Ireland.

Watts-Russell created the picturesque village of Ilam adjacent to the estate. The valley and surrounding hills reminded him of the Swiss Alps, and consequently he had some new cottages built in a Swiss chalet style and rehoused most of the villagers. The English architect George Gilbert Scott was commissioned to design the cottages around 1840. In 1857, Watts-Russell built a school in matching style and funded its operation, at a time when schooling was not compulsory. The village has a conspicuous landmark, the Grade II* listed Mary Watts-Russell Memorial Cross, which imitates the Eleanor Crosses and is dedicated to his first wife who died in 1840.

He was High Sheriff of Staffordshire in 1819 and Conservative MP for the rotten borough of Gatton from 1820 to 1826. He was appointed as a Fellow of the Royal Society in June 1821. He received a large inheritance on his father's death in 1820, and bought the Biggin Hall estate in Benefield, Northamptonshire, two years later. He became a vice-president of the Staffordshire Conservative Association on its foundation in 1835.

Watts-Russell remarried in June 1843; his second wife, Maria Ellen Barker, died giving birth to their only son, Edward, in October 1844. His third wife was Martha Leach whom he married in November 1862.

Parliament of the United Kingdom
Preceded by Abel Rous Dottin; John Fleming	Member of Parliament for Gatton; 1820 – 1826; With: Thomas Divett	Succeeded by William Scott; Michael George Prendergast
