= William Young Craig =

William Young Craig (May 1827 – 1924) was a mining engineer, colliery owner and Liberal politician who sat in the House of Commons from 1880 to 1885.

Craig was the son of John Craig of Burntisland, Fife, but was himself born at Haggerston, a village near Lindisfarne, Northumberland. He became a mining engineer and a coal and ironstone proprietor in North Staffordshire. He was president of the North Staffordshire Institute of Mining and Mechanical Engineers in 1879 and 1880.

At the 1880 general election Craig was elected Member of Parliament for North Staffordshire. He held the seat until 1885. In the 1880s he purchased the Brynkinalt colliery near Chirk.

Craig died in Wrexham at the age of 96.

Craig married Harriet Milton Stanney daughter of Captain Richard Stanney of the Isle of Wight in 1857. Their daughter Jean married Sir Walter Palmer, 1st Baronet MP for Salisbury.

Parliament of the United Kingdom
Preceded by Colin Minton Campbell; Robert William Hanbury	Member of Parliament for North Staffordshire; 1880 – 1885; With: Harry Davenport	constituency abolished
