= Hugh Harrison =

Hugh Harrison may refer to:

- Hugh Harrison (cricketer)
- Hugh G. Harrison, mayor of Minneapolis, Minnesota.
