= John Chetwynd-Talbot =

John Chetwynd-Talbot may refer to:

- John Chetwynd-Talbot, 1st Earl Talbot (1749–1793), British peer and politician
- John Chetwynd-Talbot, 21st Earl of Shrewsbury (1914–1980), British peer
