= 1878 North Staffordshire by-election =

UK Parliamentary by-election

The 1878 North Staffordshire by-election was fought on 24 April 1878. The by-election was fought due to the elevation to the peerage of the incumbent Conservative MP, Charles Adderley. It was won by the Conservative candidate Robert William Hanbury who was unopposed.
