= Admiral Carnegie =

Admiral Carnegie may refer to:

- George Carnegie, 6th Earl of Northesk (1716–1792), British Royal Navy admiral
- Swynfen Carnegie (1813–1879), British Royal Navy admiral
- William Carnegie, 7th Earl of Northesk (1756–1831), British Royal Navy admiral
