= Francis Egerton, 3rd Earl of Ellesmere =

British peer, soldier and author

The Right Honourable The Earl of Ellesmere VD DL JP
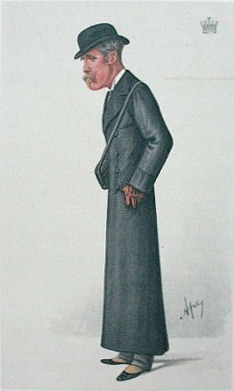
- "Bridgewater House"; The Earl of Ellesmere as caricatured by Ape (Carlo Pellegrini) in Vanity Fair, January 1887

Earl of Ellesmere
- In office 19 September 1862 – 13 July 1914
- Preceded by: George Egerton
- Succeeded by: John Egerton

Personal details
- Born: Francis Charles Granville Egerton; 5 April 1847 London, England
- Died: 13 July 1914 (aged 67)
- Spouse: Lady Katherine Louisa Phipps (m. 1868)
- Children: Lady Mabel Egerton; Lady Alice Egerton; Beatrice Kemp, Baroness Rochdale; John Egerton, 4th Earl of Ellesmere; Major Hon. Francis Egerton; Hon. Thomas Egerton; Lady Katherine Hardy; Lt-Col Hon. Wilfred Egerton; Lady Leila Egerton; Lady Helen Egerton; Hon. Reginald Egerton
- Parents: George Egerton, 2nd Earl of Ellesmere; Lady Mary Louisa Campbell
- Relatives: Egerton family; Egert family
- Education: Eton College; Trinity College, Cambridge (B.A., 1867)
- Occupation: Peer, soldier, author

Arms of the Egerton family

Francis Charles Granville Egerton, 3rd Earl of Ellesmere VD, DL, JP (5 April 1847 – 13 July 1914), styled Viscount Brackley between 1857 and 1862, was a British peer, soldier and author from the Egerton family. He owned several racehorses and 13,300 acres (54 km^{2}) land.

== Background ==
Born in London, he was the eldest son of George Egerton, 2nd Earl of Ellesmere, and his wife, Lady Mary Louisa, the youngest daughter of John Campbell, 1st Earl Cawdor. In 1862, aged only fifteen, he succeeded his father as earl. Egerton was educated at Eton College and then at Trinity College, Cambridge, where he graduated with Bachelor of Arts in 1867.

== Career ==
On 13 May 1864 Egerton was commissioned as a cornet in the part-time Duke of Lancaster's Own Yeomanry, in which his father had previously served and which was commanded by his uncle, the Hon Algernon Egerton. He was promoted to captain in 1869 From 14 April 1875 he also served as Lieutenant-Colonel Commandant of the 40th (3rd Manchester) Lancashire Rifle Volunteer Corps (later the 4th Volunteer Battalion, Manchester Regiment) in succession to his uncle.

He was granted an honorary majorship in the Duke of Lancaster's Yeomanry in July 1884 and was confirmed to the full rank in October. Two years later, Egerton became an honorary lieutenant-colonel and in January 1891 received command of the regiment.

In March 1891 he retired from the Volunteers and he was appointed Honorary Colonel of the 4th Volunteer Battalion, Manchester Regiment (later the 7th Battalion Manchester Regiment in the Territorial Force). He retired from the Yeomanry in January 1896 and became the regiment's honorary colonel two months later. Egerton received the Volunteer Decoration (VD) in November that year.

He was appointed a Knight of Grace of the Venerable Order of Saint John in 1908 and was advanced to a Knight of Justice in 1910. Egerton was a Justice of the Peace for the counties of Lancaster and Northampton and a Deputy Lieutenant of Lancashire.

== Family ==
On 9 December 1868, he married Lady Katherine Louisa Phipps, second daughter of George Phipps, 2nd Marquess of Normanby. They had eleven children, six daughters and five sons.

- Lady Mabel Laura Egerton (16 December 1869 – 25 November 1946)
- Lady Alice Constance Egerton (12 November 1870 – 6 November 1932)
- Lady Beatrice Mary Egerton, MBE (5 November 1871 – 7 September 1966); married George Kemp, 1st Baron Rochdale
- John Francis Granville Scrope Egerton, 4th Earl of Ellesmere (14 November 1872 – 24 August 1944)
- Major Hon. Francis William George Egerton, Duke of Lancaster's Own Yeomanry, (4 December 1874 – 4 April 1948)
- Hon. Thomas Henry Frederick Egerton (10 September 1876 – 1 October 1953); married 1902 Lady Bertha Anson, daughter of Thomas Anson, 3rd Earl of Lichfield, grandfather of Francis Egerton, 7th Duke of Sutherland
- Lady Katherine Augusta Victoria Egerton, DGStJ (2 December 1877 – 27 October 1960); married Charles Hardy, JP (d. 11 November 1940)
- Lt-Col Hon. Wilfred Charles William Egerton, Royal Air Force (21 September 1879 – 27 December 1939)
- Lady Leila Georgina Egerton (23 December 1881 – 22 August 1964)
- Lady Helen Constance Egerton (24 September 1884 – 3 April 1901)
- Hon. Reginald Arthur Egerton (6 July 1886 – 13 September 1904).

Egerton died in 1914 and was succeeded in his titles by his eldest son, John. His wife survived him until 1926.

== Works ==
- Sir Hector's Watch
- A Broken Stirrup-Leather
- A Sapphire Ring
- Mrs John Foster

Military offices
Preceded by ?	Honorary Colonel of the Duke of Lancaster's Own Yeomanry; 1896–1912	Succeeded by John Rutherford
Peerage of the United Kingdom
Preceded by George Egerton	Earl of Ellesmere; 1862–1914	Succeeded by John Egerton
