= Charles Chetwynd-Talbot, 20th Earl of Shrewsbury =

British peer

Major The Right Honourable The Earl of Shrewsbury KCVO
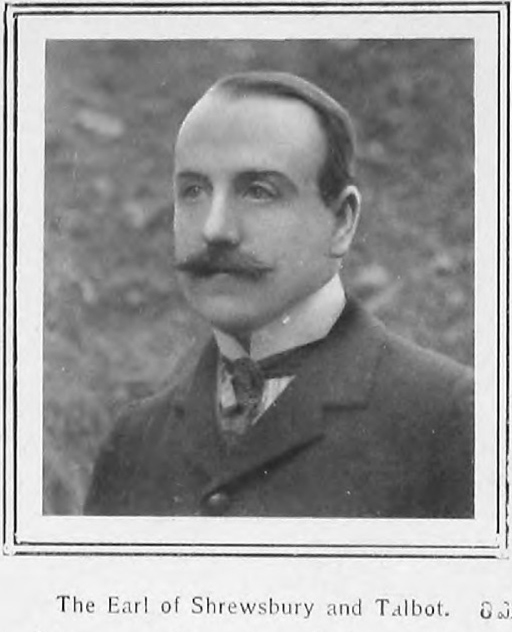

Lord High Steward of Ireland
- In office 1877–1921
- Preceded by: The Earl of Shrewsbury
- Succeeded by: The Earl of Shrewsbury

Personal details
- Born: Charles Henry John Chetwynd-Talbot; 13 November 1860 Eaton Place, Belgravia, London
- Died: 7 May 1921 (aged 60)
- Spouse: Ellen Palmer-Morewood Mundy (m. 1882)
- Children: Charles Chetwynd-Talbot, Viscount Ingestre
- Parent(s): Charles Chetwynd-Talbot, 19th Earl of Shrewsbury; Anna Theresa Cockerell
- Education: Eton College

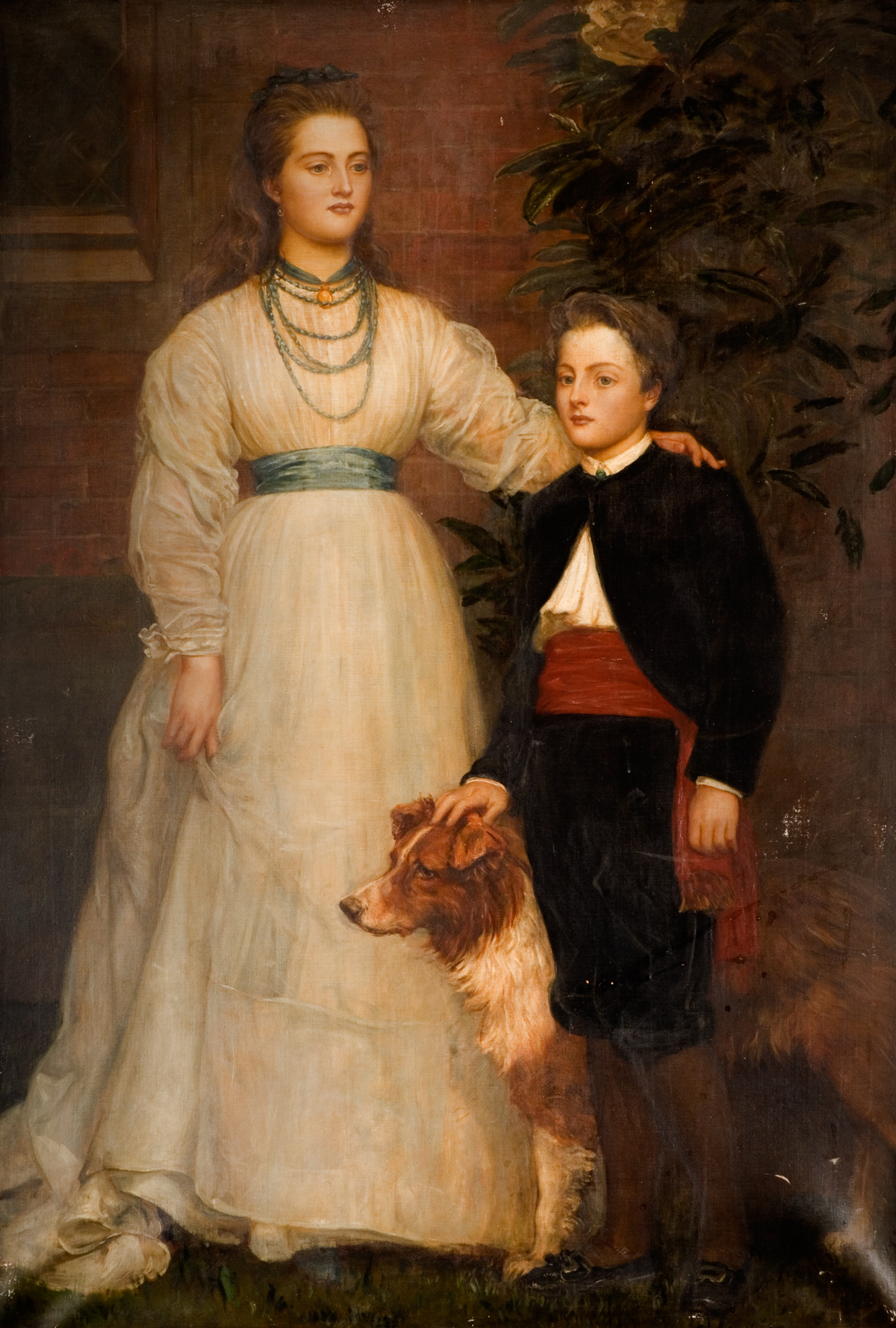
Lord Shrewsbury with his sister Theresa

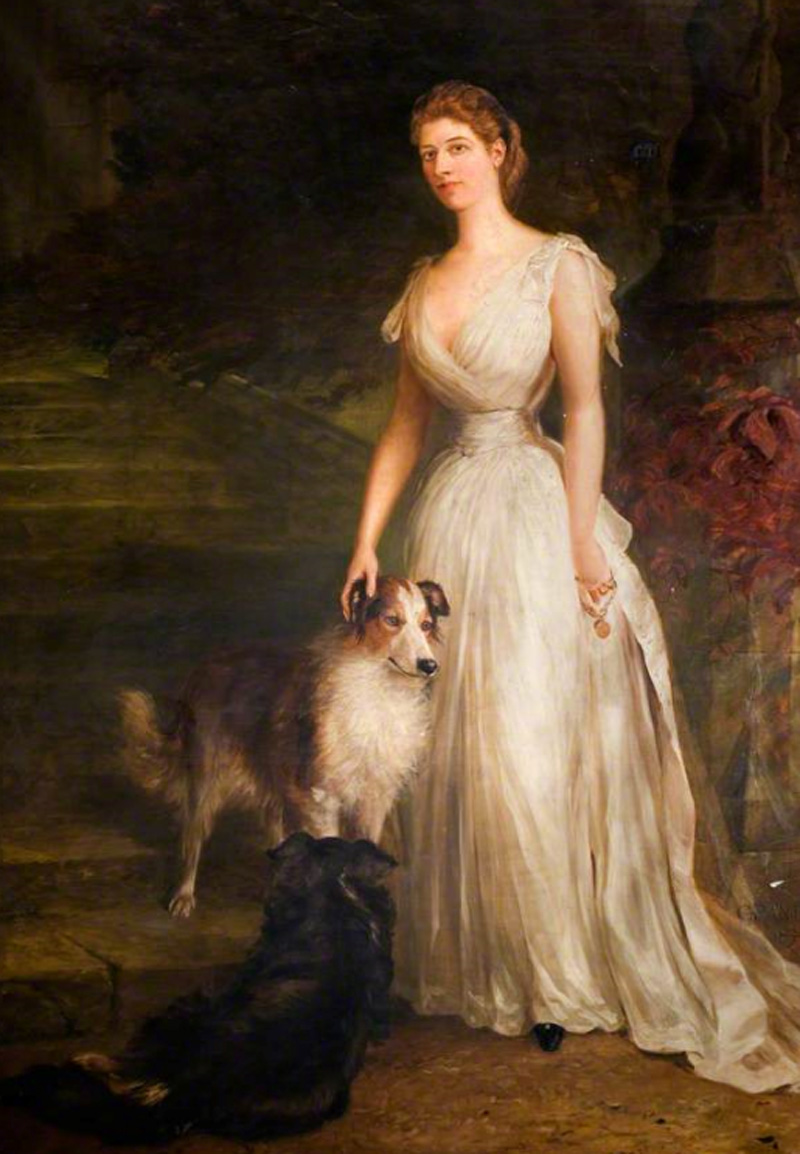
Lord Shrewsbury's wife, Ellen, Countess of Shrewsbury, in 1894

Major Charles Henry John Chetwynd-Talbot, 20th Earl of Shrewsbury, 20th Earl of Waterford, 5th Earl Talbot , KCVO (13 November 1860 – 7 May 1921), styled Viscount Ingestre from 1868 to 1877, was a British peer. Unlike other wealthy noblemen of the period, he went into business, opening several ventures connected to road transport, with mixed success.

== Family background ==
Shrewsbury, who was born at Eaton Place, Belgravia, London, was the only son and heir of Charles Chetwynd-Talbot, 19th Earl of Shrewsbury and 4th Earl Talbot. His grandfather, The 18th Earl of Shrewsbury, had inherited the earldoms from a very distant cousin, and had to prove his claim to the premier earldoms of Great Britain and Ireland on the Roll in the House of Lords by demonstrating his descent from the 2nd Earl of Shrewsbury and 2nd Earl of Waterford. Shrewsbury was the nephew of: Constance, who married The 8th Marquess of Lothian; Gertrude, who married The 13th Earl of Pembroke; and Adelaide, who married The 3rd Earl Brownlow, the brother of Theresa, a notable hostess, who married The 6th Marquess of Londonderry.

== Inheritance ==
Shrewsbury's very rich father died when Shrewsbury, then styled as Viscount Ingestre, was a schoolboy of 16. All his father's property and personal wealth were left to the young Lord Shrewsbury's mother, the former Anna Theresa Cockerell. She lived until 1912, when he was aged 51.

== Education and marriage ==
Lord Shrewsbury was educated at Eton College and inherited his titles when only 16 years of age. On 21 June 1882, at the age of 19, he eloped with an older married woman, Ellen, née Palmer-Morewood, wife of commoner, Alfred Edward Miller Mundy of Shipley Hall, whom she had married in 1873. Ellen was a granddaughter of The 7th Baron Byron (a cousin of The 6th Baron Byron, the famous poet), and already had a daughter. Shrewsbury's heir, Lord Ingestre, was born less than three months after the marriage of his parents. Ingestre died in the lifetime of his parents, but had several children, including The 21st Earl of Shrewsbury and 21st Earl of Waterford, the father of the current Earl.

Before his marriage, in July 1879 Shrewsbury began an affair with the actress Lillie Langtry, although then married to her husband Edward; in January 1880, Langtry and Shrewsbury were reportedly planning to run away together, but the relationship was superseded by his elopement with his future Countess.

== Public offices and honours ==
In right of his peerage, Lord Shrewsbury became Hereditary Lord High Steward of Ireland, in which capacity he took part in the coronations of Kings Edward VII and George V, and accompanied the former on his state visit to Dublin in July 1903. He was made KCVO in 1907. He also became High Steward of the Borough of Stafford in 1892.

== Equestrian interests ==
He started his own polo club in 1893. In 1895, Lord Shrewsbury founded the Staffordshire Polo Club at his house, Ingestre Hall. Players included The 8th Earl of Harrington, Algernon Burnaby, Captain Daily Fergusson, Captain The Hon. Robert Greville, Gerald Hardy, Albert Jones, Captain "Wendy" Jones, Edward and George Miller, Norman Nickalls, Bertram Portal, Captain Gordon Renton, Jasper Selwyn and John Reid Walker.

=== Greyhound coach ===
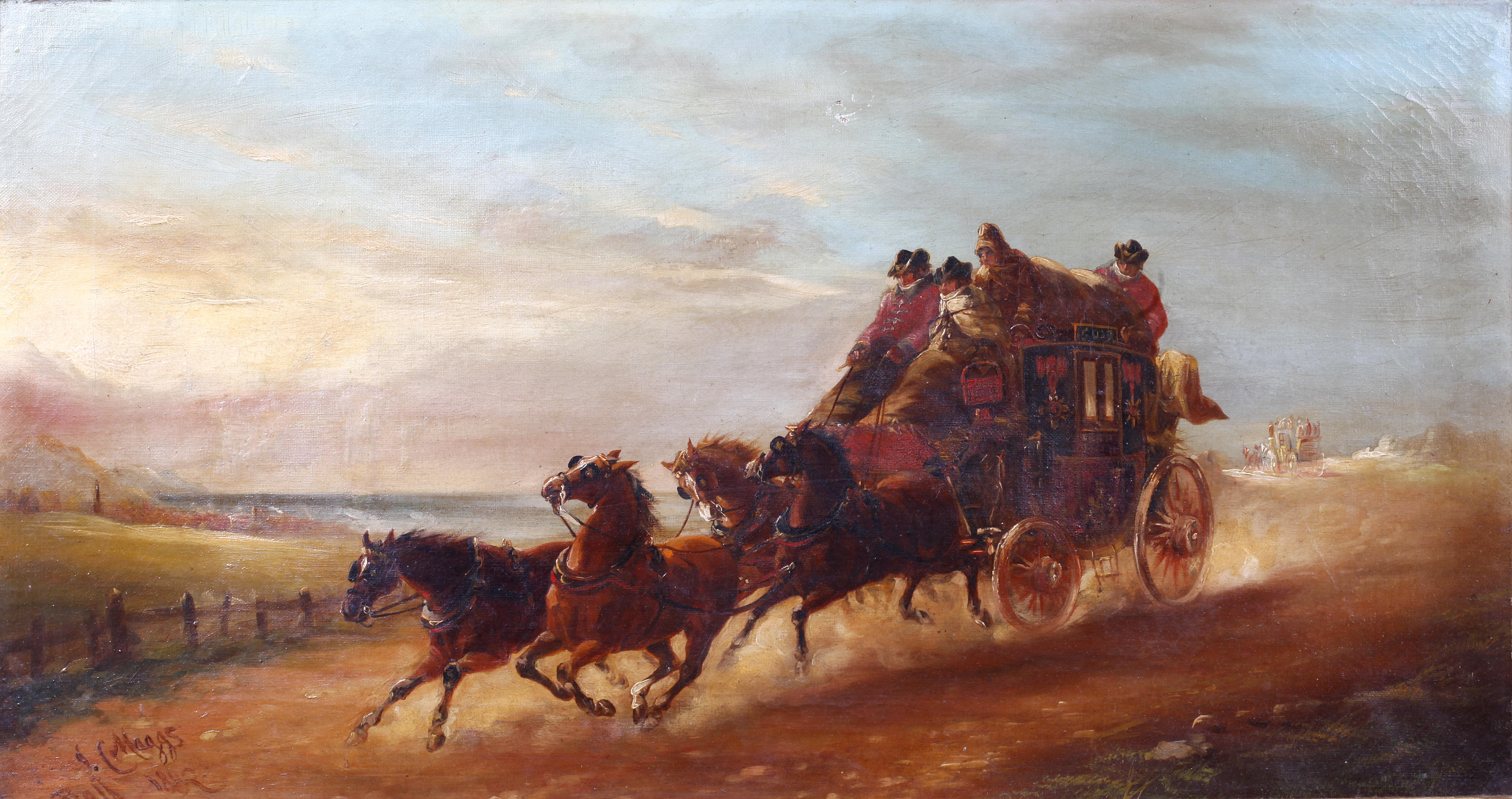
1884

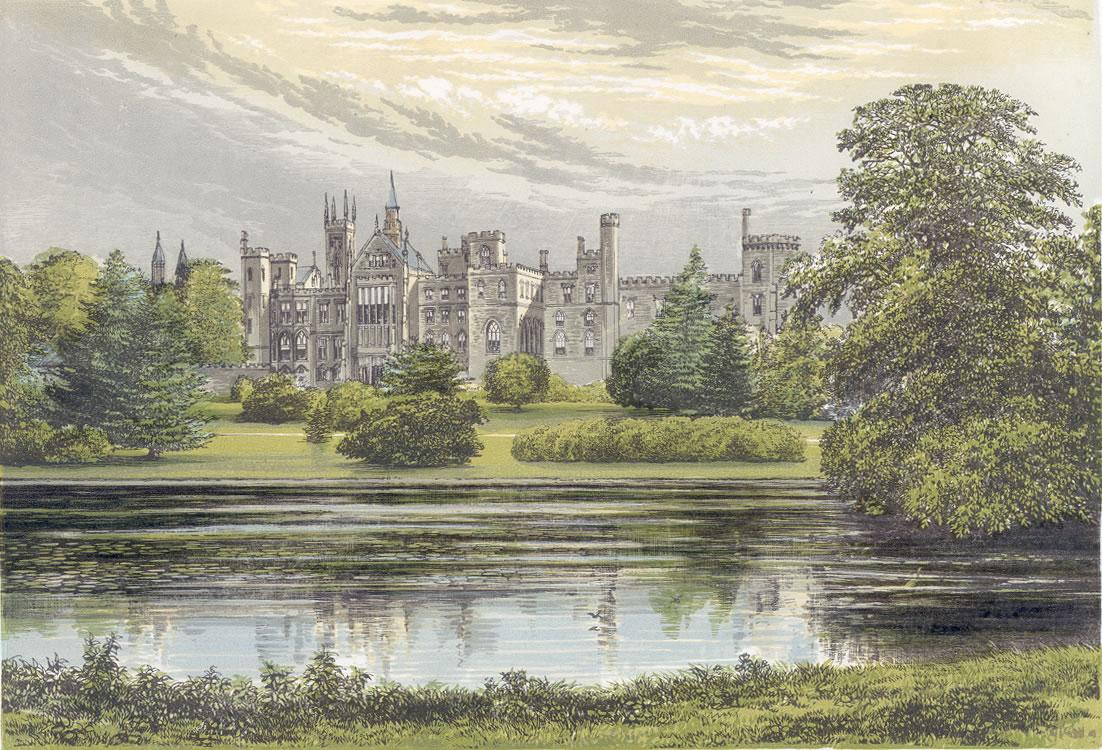
Alton Towers c. 1880

A devotee of coach driving, for several seasons Lord Shrewsbury ran the daily Greyhound coach service the 20 miles from Buxton Spa to his house, Alton Towers, now the site of a theme park.

== Investing in personal transportation ==
=== Hansom cabs de luxe ===
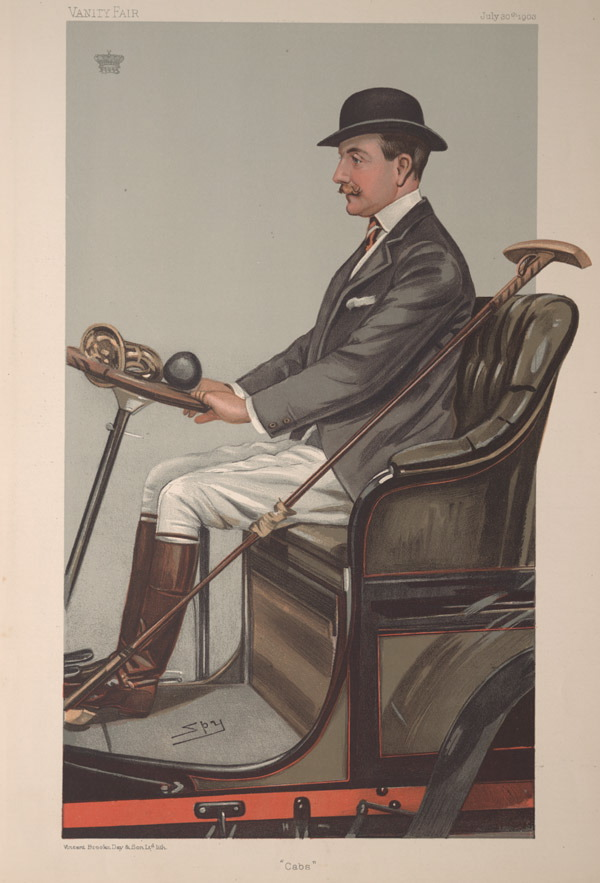
Caricature of Lord Shrewsbury in 1903

For many years he was in business as a hansom cab owner, his vehicles marked "S.T." (for Shrewsbury and Talbot) and the horses "being of the best possible quality", and he was the first owner to have cabs that were fitted with noiseless tyres operating in London and Paris.

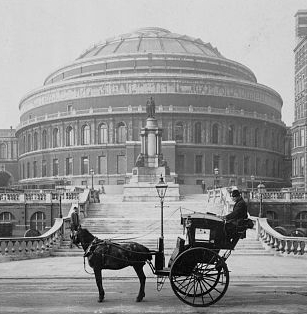
A hansom cab, London, 1904.

Then, aged only 23, he began in Westminster, London, in the summer of 1884 with 35 Forder Royal Hansom cabs made by Forder of Wolverhampton, who held Royal Warrants for their carriages and made luxury hansoms for private use. Lord Shrewsbury's were built to Forder's special patented design and they were of Forder's special lightweight construction. Each was fitted with rubber tyres (Note: An invention patented in 1883 allowed the manufacture of rubber tyred wheels at about one-tenth of the previous cost. The Shrewsbury And Talbot S. T. Cab Company (Limited) v. Sterckx. The TimesThursday, 19 December 1895; pg. 3; Issue 34764.) for passenger comfort which also had a side effect of lengthening the carriage's life. All his horses were hog-maned (Note: The mane is cut very short and stands erect) and on the side of each cab was a coronet and the initials S and T at either side of it. The telephone was laid on to the stables so a cab might be called at a moment's notice.

To begin with, drivers paid £1 a day for the use of the horse and cab, keeping the remainder of their takings. In slack periods the drivers would strike, asking Lord Shrewsbury for a price reduction. In the summer of 1888, he floated a public listed company, The Shrewsbury and Talbot Cab and Noiseless Tyre Company Limited, to buy two businesses. Firstly, the business of cab proprietor and job master worked by the earl himself, and secondly the business of The Noiseless Tyre Company Limited, manufacturers of steel and rubber tyres in Manchester and London.

In the spring of 1891, following almost annual strikes by his cab drivers, Lord Shrewsbury put his company's 300 horses up for sale, under police protection, in the company's Battersea premises. At that time they operated from a number of yards in different parts of London. The press reported the terms offered to drivers in detail, then the prices of the horses, and advised that every animal put up for sale had been sold. Strong competition from other rubber tyred cabs seems to have become a serious problem. The business was restarted in October 1891 with cabmen friendly to the company.

== Motoring ==
In November 1900, Lord Shrewsbury formed another public listed company, Shrewsbury S T and Challiner Tyre Company Limited, to manufacture and deal in cabs, carriages, motor cars, cycles, vehicles, tyres, tubes, wire, India rubber and gutta percha goods, etc. In December 1903, he was described in a court action brought by Dunlop over the importation of Michelin tyres as "proprietor of the business known as Maison Talbot in London's Long Acre managed by Mr Weigel." (Note: "Daniel M Weigel, managing director of the British Automobile Commercial Syndicate Limited. Started motoring in 1893 and has been a prominent figure in the business side of the industry ever since. In 1900 in conjunction with the Earl of Shrewsbury and Talbot, he formed the British Automobile Commercial Syndicate Limited. Introduced the first "Clément-Talbot" car into England in 1901. In 1902 formed the firm of J Rothschild et fils Limited opening a London branch of that famous firm of Parisian motor-carriage builders. Is now connected with the firms of J Rothschild et fils Limited and the Maison Talbot, of the latter of which he is the managing director. Club A.C.G.B.&I." The Motoring Annual and Motorist's Year Book, 1904)

In March 1901 he formed British Automobile Commercial Syndicate Limited "with objects sufficiently indicated by the title". The shareholders were not people of note but provided addresses in the then almost semi-rural Ladbroke Grove, Notting Hill, Shepherd's Bush areas and Hatton Garden EC. One of the shareholders was a Mr R. Weigel of 25 Maxilla Gardens, North Kensington. Lord Shrewsbury was the first chairman. The other first directors were M. Chabert, president of the Société Commerciale d'Automobiles, Paris, and Mr D.M. Weigel, managing director. The new premises, (formerly occupied by carriage builders) at 97-98 Long Acre (adjoining 1 Endell Street), covered "four large floors". Twelve months later, Lord Shrewsbury was made chairman of Messrs J. Rothschild and Son Limited, incorporated to carry on the business of making motor car bodies by expanding the London activities of the well-known French businesses of Clément-Rothschild and Messrs J. Rothschild and Son. The second floor of the same building was to be Maison Talbot, suppliers of Talbot tyres (as fitted by The Hon. C.S. Rolls), the third floor to be automobile clothing. In March 1909, Shrewsbury made a formal announcement that he would close the business which could be seen to be competing with his Talbot agents.

In 1909, he floated Homoil Trust Limited, leading a board of the late engineer-in-chief of the Navy, another colliery owner and a well-known consulting engineer. The company was formed to purchase and develop various patents for the production of a cheaper home-produced and more efficient substitute for petrol made from coal-tar. It was voluntarily wound up at the end of 1910.

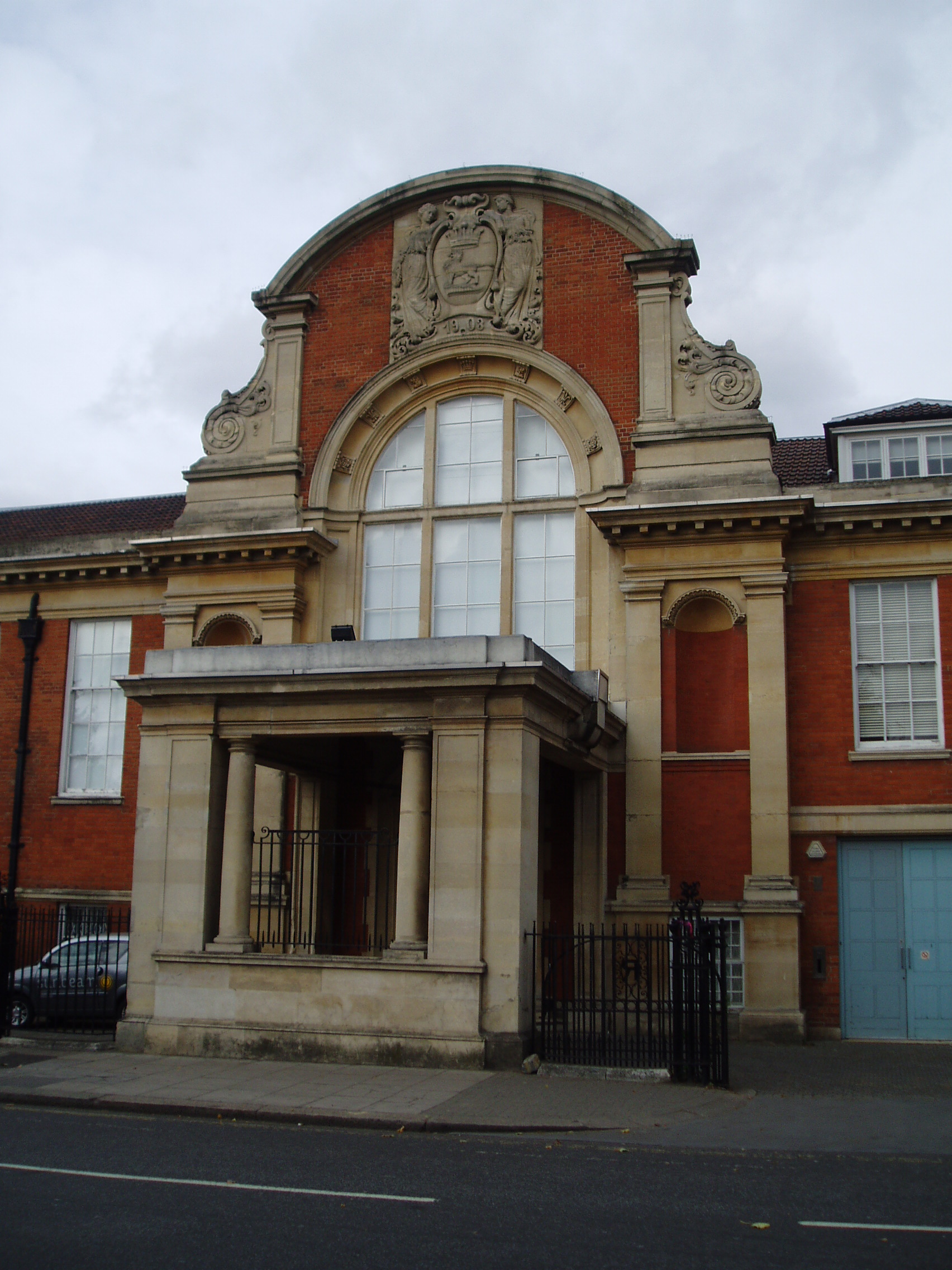
Clément-Talbot Works, North Kensington, showing Lord Shrewsbury's personal crest

=== Talbot motorcars ===
Lord Shrewsbury founded Clément-Talbot Limited in 1902. He built for it the United Kingdom's first purpose-built automotive-manufacturing plant in London's North Kensington with his own personal crest set high above the entrance to the administration building. He involved Adolphe Clément-Bayard as his "engineer" and began by importing his popular French Clément-Bayard cars into Britain.

At Brooklands in November 1912, Lord Shrewsbury's Talbot car of only 25.6 horsepower rating, driven by Percy Lambert, attained a speed of 113.28 miles per hour and broke many other class records. The only faster car on the Brooklands track was a Mercedes-Benz of 84.8 horsepower rating.

== Military service ==
The earl served entirely on home service in Britain during the First World War. He was a major in the Army Remount Service of the Army Service Corps from 1914 to 1915, and temporary major with the Royal Welch Fusiliers 1916 to 1917. In January 1915, his only son, Viscount Ingestre, a reservist in the Royal Horse Guards at Regent's Park Barracks, died in London of influenza followed by pneumonia.

== Later life ==
Lord Shrewsbury died in May 1921, aged 60, and was buried at the parish church of Ingestre. There then ensued an inheritance battle for his estate between his wife and his grandson. His grandson, John, 21st Earl of Shrewsbury, claimed the late 20th earl had not been of sound mind when his last will was written and won a court settlement. Ellen left the house the late Earl had built for her, 'Cariad' in Goring-on-Thames, moving to 'Cariad Cottage' in an equally tranquil setting. Prior to Lord Shrewsbury's death, he had already bequeathed her the sum of £2,000 per month until she died.

== Ancestry ==
Ancestry of Charles Chetwynd-Talbot, 20th Earl of Shrewsbury

8. Charles Chetwynd-Talbot, 2nd Earl Talbot
4. Henry Chetwynd-Talbot, 18th Earl of Shrewsbury
9. Frances Thomasine Lambart, Countess Talbot
2. Charles Chetwynd-Talbot, 19th Earl of Shrewsbury
10. Henry Beresford, 2nd Marquess of Waterford
5. Lady Sarah Elizabeth Beresford, Countess of Shrewsbury
11. Susanna Carpenter, Marchioness of Waterford
1. Charles Chetwynd-Talbot, 20th Earl of Shrewsbury
12. Samuel Pepys Cockerell
6. Cpt. Richard Howe Cockerell, RN
13. Anne Whetham
3. Anna Theresa Cockerell
14. Thomas Gleadowe-Newcomen, 2nd Viscount Newcomen
7. Hon. Anna Theresa Newcomen
15. Harriet Holland

== Notes ==
Honorary titles
Preceded by The Earl of Shrewsbury	Lord High Steward of Ireland; 1877–1921	Succeeded by The Earl of Shrewsbury
Peerage of England
Preceded by Charles Chetwynd-Talbot	Earl of Shrewsbury; 1877–1921	Succeeded by John Chetwynd-Talbot
Peerage of Ireland
Preceded by Charles Chetwynd-Talbot	Earl of Waterford; 1877–1921	Succeeded by John Chetwynd-Talbot
Peerage of Great Britain
Preceded by Charles Chetwynd-Talbot	Earl Talbot; 1877–1921	Succeeded by John Chetwynd-Talbot
