= Muriel, Viscountess Helmsley =

British noble

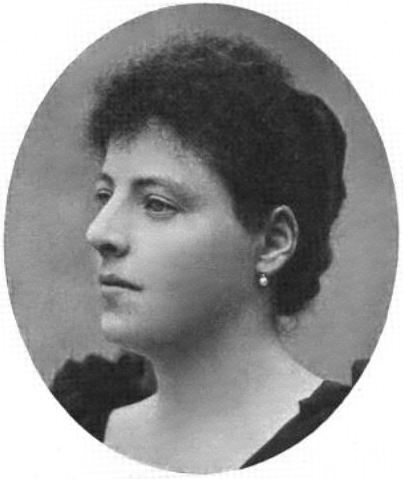
- Born: Muriel Frances Louisa Chetwynd-Talbot; 1859
- Died: 2 March 1925 (aged 66); London, England
- Occupation(s): Social reformer, politician
- Spouses: William Duncombe, Viscount Helmsley (m. 1876; died 1881) Hugh Darby Annesley Owen (m. 1885; died 1908)
- Children: 2

Muriel Duncombe, Viscountess Helmsley (1859–1925) was a prominent figure in the Garden City movement in the UK at the turn of the 20th century, and was the first Secretary of the Garden City Association's Women's League.

== Early life ==
She was born in 1859 as Lady Muriel Frances Louisa Chetwynd-Talbot, the daughter of Charles Chetwynd-Talbot, 19th Earl of Shrewsbury, and Anna Theresa Cockerell. At the age of seventeen, in 1876, she married William Duncombe, Viscount Helmsley, and they had a son and a daughter. Lord Helmsley died in 1881, and in 1885 she married Hugh Darby Annesley Owen. He died in 1908.

== Involvement in the Garden City movement ==
Viscountess Helmsley was one of the leading female figures in the early Garden City movement, which developed during a period of intense social change and the consolidation of the women's suffrage movement. The Garden City Association (GCA), the forerunner of the Town and Country Planning Association, was created in 1899 to promulgate the movement's aims, and by 1903 a Women's League had formed, which sought specifically to provide a forum to consider the needs of a home from the viewpoint of "wives and mothers". Viscountess Helmsley was the leader and first Secretary of this league, and encouraged other women to further the cause by talking to friends, circulating leaflets, seeking to arrange meetings and lectures, speaking to other groups, and encouraging people to buy shares in the First Garden City Ltd company, the developer and owner of Letchworth Garden City.

She published articles highlighting the work of the Women's League and argued that "if the women clearly understood the benefits of living in an atmosphere such as Garden City will afford, they would demand a change from the slums, and would influence their mankind and children to go and live where homes – real homes, not barracks – can be procured for less rent in a wholesome area, thus helping the children to grow up stronger and healthier in mind and body." In June 1907 a meeting her home in Chelsea, London, concluded with the election of six Women's League officers and herself as President, and it was decided to raise money to finance the building of two cottages at Letchworth.

== Other activities ==
Viscountess Helmsley was an active Conservative politician in Islington, London, chaired the National Society of Day Nurseries and was Honorary Secretary of the Women's Institute Training College Branch for Nursing. She died at her home in London on 2 March 1925.
