= North Staffordshire (constituency) =

Parliamentary constituency in the United Kingdom, 1832–1885

- Former county constituency for the House of Commons
- County: Staffordshire

1832–1885
- Seats: Two
- Created from: Staffordshire
- Replaced by: North West Staffordshire; Leek; Burton

North Staffordshire (formally the Northern division of Staffordshire) was a county constituency in the county of Staffordshire. It returned two Members of Parliament (MPs) to the House of Commons of the Parliament of the United Kingdom, elected by the bloc vote system.

== History ==
The constituency was created by the Reform Act 1832 for the 1832 general election, and abolished by the Redistribution of Seats Act 1885 for the 1885 general election.

== Boundaries ==
1832–1868: The Hundreds of Pirehill, Totmonslow and North Offlow.

1868–1885: The Hundreds of Totmonslow and Pirehill North.

== Members of Parliament ==
Election	1st Member	1st Party	2nd Member	2nd Party
1832	Sir Oswald Mosley, Bt	Whig	Edward Buller-Yarde-Buller	Whig
1837	Hon. Bingham Baring	Conservative	Edward Buller-Yarde-Buller	Whig
1841	Jesse David Watts-Russell	Conservative	Charles Adderley	Conservative
1847	Viscount Brackley	Conservative	Charles Adderley	Conservative
1851 by-election	Smith Child	Conservative	Charles Adderley	Conservative
1859	Viscount Ingestre	Conservative	Charles Adderley	Conservative
1865	Sir Edward Manningham-Buller, Bt	Liberal	Charles Adderley	Conservative
1874	Colin Minton Campbell	Conservative	Charles Adderley	Conservative
1878 by-election	Colin Minton Campbell	Conservative	Robert William Hanbury	Conservative
1880	William Young Craig	Liberal	Harry Davenport	Conservative
1885	constituency abolished			

== Election results ==
=== Elections in the 1830s ===
General election 1832: North Staffordshire
Party	Candidate	Votes	%
Whig	Oswald Mosley	4,777	37.4
Whig	Edward Buller-Yarde-Buller	4,595	36.0
Tory	Jesse David Watts-Russell	3,387	26.5
Majority		1,208	9.5
Turnout		7,886	90.1
Registered electors		8,756	
Whig win (new seat)			
Whig win (new seat)			

General election 1835: North Staffordshire
Party	Candidate	Votes	%
Whig	Oswald Mosley	Unopposed	
Whig	Edward Buller-Yarde-Buller	Unopposed	
Registered electors		8,717	
Whig hold			
Whig hold			

General election 1837: North Staffordshire
Party	Candidate	Votes	%
Conservative	Bingham Baring	4,332	43.9
Whig	Edward Buller-Yarde-Buller	3,182	32.3
Whig	Oswald Mosley	2,351	23.8
Turnout		7,182	75.3
Registered electors		9,540	
Majority		1,981	20.1
Conservative gain from Whig			
Majority		831	8.5
Whig hold			

=== Elections in the 1840s ===
General election 1841: North Staffordshire
Party	Candidate	Votes	%	±%
Conservative	Charles Adderley	Unopposed		
Conservative	Jesse David Watts-Russell	Unopposed		
Registered electors		10,282		
Conservative hold				
Conservative gain from Whig				

General election 1847: North Staffordshire
Party	Candidate	Votes	%	±%
Conservative	Charles Adderley	4,092	35.5	N/A
Conservative	George Egerton	4,076	35.4	N/A
Whig	Edward Buller-Yarde-Buller	3,353	29.1	New
Majority		723	6.3	N/A
Turnout		7,437 (est)	78.8 (est)	N/A
Registered electors		9,438		
Conservative hold		Swing	N/A	
Conservative hold		Swing	N/A	

=== Elections in the 1850s ===
Egerton's resignation caused a by-election.

By-election, 22 February 1851: North Staffordshire
Party	Candidate	Votes	%	±%
Conservative	Smith Child	Unopposed		
Conservative hold				

General election 1852: North Staffordshire
Party	Candidate	Votes	%	±%
Conservative	Charles Adderley	Unopposed		
Conservative	Smith Child	Unopposed		
Registered electors		9,546		
Conservative hold				
Conservative hold				

General election 1857: North Staffordshire
Party	Candidate	Votes	%	±%
Conservative	Charles Adderley	4,112	37.4	N/A
Conservative	Smith Child	3,865	35.1	N/A
Whig	Edward Buller-Yarde-Buller	3,020	27.5	New
Majority		845	7.6	N/A
Turnout		7,009 (est)	73.5 (est)	N/A
Registered electors		9,536		
Conservative hold				
Conservative hold				

Adderley was appointed Vice-President of the Committee of the Privy Council for Education, requiring a by-election.

By-election, 8 March 1858: North Staffordshire
Party	Candidate	Votes	%	±%
Conservative	Charles Adderley	Unopposed		
Conservative hold				

General election 1859: North Staffordshire
Party	Candidate	Votes	%	±%
Conservative	Charles Adderley	Unopposed		
Conservative	Charles Chetwynd-Talbot	Unopposed		
Registered electors		10,859		
Conservative hold				
Conservative hold				

=== Elections in the 1860s ===
General election 1865: North Staffordshire
Party	Candidate	Votes	%	±%
Liberal	Edward Buller	4,628	35.3	New
Conservative	Charles Adderley	4,416	33.7	N/A
Conservative	Charles Chetwynd-Talbot	4,053	30.9	N/A
Majority		575	4.4	N/A
Turnout		8,863 (est)	82.8 (est)	N/A
Registered electors		10,703		
Liberal gain from Conservative				
Conservative hold				

General election 1868: North Staffordshire
Party	Candidate	Votes	%	±%
Conservative	Charles Adderley	Unopposed		
Liberal	Edward Manningham-Buller	Unopposed		
Registered electors		10,261		
Conservative hold				
Liberal hold				

=== Elections in the 1870s ===
General election 1874: North Staffordshire
Party	Candidate	Votes	%	±%
Conservative	Charles Adderley	Unopposed		
Conservative	Colin Minton Campbell	Unopposed		
Registered electors		10,104		
Conservative hold				
Conservative gain from Liberal				

Adderley was appointed President of the Board of Trade, requiring a by-election.

By-election, 23 March 1874: North Staffordshire
Party	Candidate	Votes	%	±%
Conservative	Charles Adderley	Unopposed		
Conservative hold				

Adderley was elevated to the peerage, becoming Lord Norton, and causing a by-election.

By-election, 24 April 1878: North Staffordshire
Party	Candidate	Votes	%	±%
Conservative	Robert William Hanbury	Unopposed		
Conservative hold				

=== Elections in the 1880s ===
General election 1880: North Staffordshire
Party	Candidate	Votes	%	±%
Liberal	William Young Craig	4,821	37.3	New
Conservative	Harry Davenport	4,333	33.5	N/A
Conservative	Robert William Hanbury	3,764	29.1	N/A
Majority		1,057	8.2	N/A
Turnout		8,870 (est)	80.8 (est)	N/A
Registered electors		10,974		
Liberal gain from Conservative		Swing	N/A	
Conservative hold		Swing	N/A	

== Sources ==
- Leigh Rayment's Historical List of MPs – Constituencies beginning with "S" (part 4)
