= Nadine, Countess of Shrewsbury =

English opera soprano

The Right Honourable The Countess of Shrewsbury
- Born: Nadine Muriel Crofton-Atkins; 24 January 1913
- Died: 19 February 2003 (aged 90); Bedford, Bedfordshire
- Spouse: John Chetwynd-Talbot, 21st Earl of Shrewsbury (m. 1936; div. 1963)
- Children: Charles Chetwynd-Talbot
- Parent(s): Cyril Randell Crofton-Atkins; Mary Ruth Josephine Emily Lyne Evans

Nadine Muriel, Countess of Shrewsbury (née Crofton-Atkins; 24 January 1913 – 19 February 2003), known professionally as Nadine Talbot and later as Nadine Credi, was an English opera soprano and the first wife of John Chetwynd-Talbot, 21st Earl of Shrewsbury (1914–1980). They married in 1936.

== Biography ==
Her father was Brigadier-General Cyril Randell Crofton-Atkins, of Crediton, and her mother was Mary Ruth Josephine Emily Lyne Evans, daughter of Arthur Henry Lyne Evans, of the colliery and foundry-owning Evans family of Haydock, Lancashire.

== Career ==
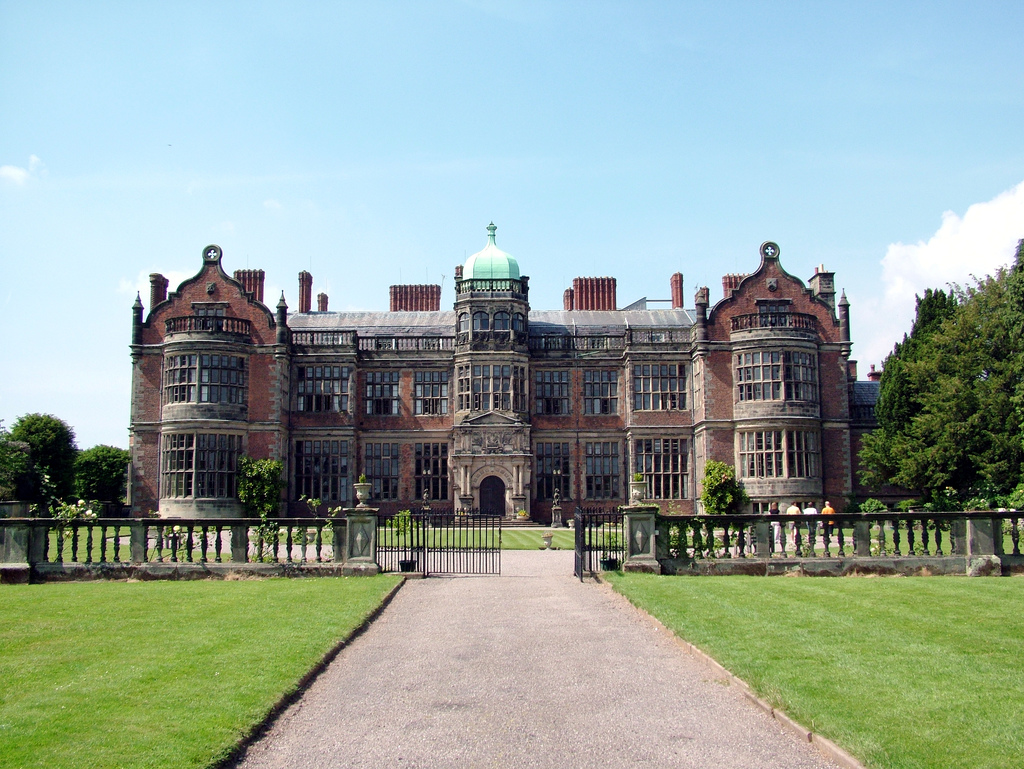
Ingestre Hall

She promoted two seasons of Opera at Ingestre in 1957 and 1958, an opera festival at Ingestre Hall, the couple's home. She was one of a series of society beauties photographed as classical figures by Madame Yevonde.

== Personal life ==
In 1936, Nadine was married to John Chetwynd-Talbot, 21st Earl of Shrewsbury (1914–1980), the son of Charles John Alton Chetwynd-Talbot, Viscount of Ingestre (eldest son of the 20th Earl of Shrewsbury), and Lady Winifred Constance Hester Paget (sister of the 6th Marquess of Anglesey). Together, they had six children, four daughters before the birth of an heir, Charles, in 1952.

- Lady Charlotte Sarah Alexandra Chetwynd-Talbot (b. 1938), who married Camillo Cavazza dei Conti Cavazza, son of Count Alessandro Cavazza of Isola del Garda and Princess Livia Borghese; has seven children.
- Lady (Josephine) Sylvia-Rose Chetwynd-Talbot (b. 1940), who married Stafford Antony Saint; three children.
- Lady Catherine Laura Chetwynd-Talbot (b. 1945), who married Richard Sebastian Endicott Chamberlain, a grandson of Sir Joseph Austen Chamberlain; has three children.
- Lady Marguerite Mary Chetwynd-Talbot (b. 1950), who married Guy William Brisbane; one child.
- Charles Henry John Benedict Crofton Chetwynd Chetwynd-Talbot, Viscount Ingestre (b. 1952), who married Deborah Jane Hutchinson; has three children.
- Hon. Paul Anthony Alexander Bueno Chetwynd-Talbot (b. 1957), who married Sarah Elizabeth Bradley, great-granddaughter of Thomas Brand, 3rd Viscount Hampden; has three children.

Lord Shrewsbury sued for divorce in 1958, claiming that Nadine had been sexually involved with their daughter's tutor, Anthony Lowther, but in 1959 judge Charles A. Collingwood rejected the divorce suit, finding that Lord Shrewsbury had committed adultery with Nina Mortlock. In a subsequent proceeding, a divorce was granted.

Lady Shrewsbury died in Bedford, Bedfordshire, in 2003, aged 90. Following the death of her ex-husband in 1980, her son Charles succeeded to the earldoms.
