= William Fawkener Chetwynd =

British politician

William Fawkener Chetwynd (15 October 1788 – 25 April 1873) was a British politician.

Chetwynd lived at Brocton Hall in Staffordshire. He studied at Brasenose College, Oxford, then served as a captain in the 1st Life Guards. He stood in Stafford at the 1832 UK general election, winning a seat for the Whigs. In Parliament, he argued against non-conformist Protestants being permitted to take their seats. He held his seat until the 1841 UK general election, when he retired. He later served as a major in the British Army.

Parliament of the United Kingdom
Preceded by John Campbell; Thomas Gisborne	Member of Parliament for Stafford; 1832–1841; With: Rees Howell Gronow (1832–1835); Francis Holyoake Goodricke (1835); Robert Farrand (1837–1841)	Succeeded by Swynfen Carnegie; Edward Manningham-Buller
