= Edward Manningham-Buller =

British politician

Sir Edward Manningham-Buller, 1st Baronet (19 July 1800 – 22 September 1882), born Edward Buller-Yarde-Buller, was a politician in the United Kingdom. He was member of parliament (MP) for North Staffordshire from 1833 to 1841, for Stafford from 1841 to 1847, and for North Staffordshire again from 1865 to 1874.

He was made a Baronet on 20 January 1866, of Dilhorne, in the County of Stafford, and, in the same year, legally changed his name to Edward Manningham-Buller by Royal Licence.

Parliament of the United Kingdom
New constituency	Member of Parliament for North Staffordshire; 1833–1841; With: Sir Oswald Mosley	Succeeded by Bingham Baring; Sir Oswald Mosley
Preceded by William Fawkener Chetwynd; Robert Farrand	Member of Parliament for Stafford; 1841–1847; With: Swynfen Carnegie	Succeeded by John Ayshford Wise; Arthur Otway
Preceded by The Viscount Ingestre; Charles Adderley	Member of Parliament for North Staffordshire; 1865–1874; With: Charles Adderley	Succeeded by Colin Minton Campbell; Charles Adderley
Baronetage of the United Kingdom
New creation	Baronet (of Dilhorne); 1866–1882	Succeeded by Morton Manningham-Buller
