= Robert Farrand =

Robert Farrand (14 March 1792 – 2 February 1855) was a British politician.

Farrand was an illegitimate son of Christopher Atkinson Saville, a Member of Parliament for Hedon. He lived at Hale Hall in Norfolk.

Saville arranged for Farrand to stand in Hedon at the 1818 UK general election as a Whig. He won the seat, but was defeated at the 1826 UK general election. He regained it in 1830, this time standing as a Tory. Hedon was disenfranchised in 1832, but Farrand returned to politics when he stood in the 1837 Stafford by-election for the Conservative Party, winning the seat. He held it at the 1837 UK general election, but stood down in 1841.

Farrand died in 1855, and is commemorated by a tablet in the church at Holme Hale.

Parliament of the United Kingdom
Preceded by John Broadhurst; Anthony Browne	Member of Parliament for Hedon; 1818–1826; With: Edmund Turton (1818–1820); John Baillie	Succeeded by John Baillie; Thomas Hyde Villiers
Preceded by John Baillie; Thomas Hyde Villiers	Member of Parliament for Hedon; 1830–1832; With: Thomas Clifford-Constable	Succeeded by Constituency abolished
Preceded by William Fawkener Chetwynd; Francis Holyoake Goodricke	Member of Parliament for Stafford; 1837–1841; With: William Fawkener Chetwynd	Succeeded by Swynfen Carnegie; Edward Manningham-Buller
