= Clément-Rothschild =

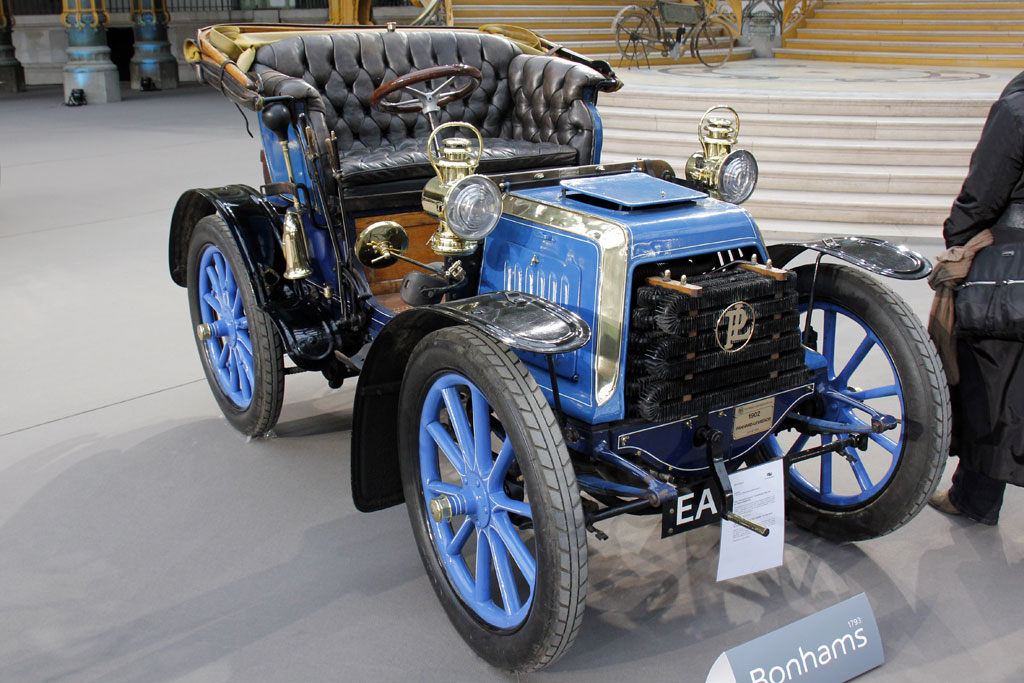
1902 Panhard-Levassor Twin Cylinder 7 hp Two Seater Clement-Rothschild

Carrosserie Clément-Rothschild produced a series of Clément-Rothschild bodied automobiles in 1902, based on the Panhard-Levassor 7 hp chassis.

== History ==
Carrosserie Clément-Rothschild were based at 33 Quai Michelet, Levallois-Perret, either adjacent to or in Adolphe Clément-Bayard's Levallois-Perret factory. (Note: There may have been two Rothschild coach-building enterprises active in Paris at that time, because J. Rothschild & Fils traded from 131 Avenue Malakoff but had been founded by Austrian-born Josef Rothschild in 1838 in Levallois-Perret, and was building automobile coachwork by 1894. By 1896 the business had been purchased by Edmond Rheims and Leon Auscher and pioneered aluminium composite coachwork.)

By 1903 a Clément-Talbot Type CT4K 18hp four cylinder was described as 'Coachwork by J.Rothschild et Fils, Paris'.

== See also ==
- Adolphe Clément-Bayard
