= Swynfen Carnegie =

Royal Navy Admiral (1813–1879)

Admiral The Honourable Swynfen Carnegie
- Born: 8 March 1813
- Died: 29 November 1879 (aged 66)
- Military career
- Allegiance: United Kingdom
- Branch: Royal Navy
- Rank: Admiral
- Commands: HMS Orestes; HMS Devastation; HMS Horatio; HMS Tribune; HMS Leander; HMS Edinburgh; HMS Colossus
- Conflicts: First Carlist War; Crimean War

Admiral Swynfen Thomas Carnegie (8 March 1813 – 29 November 1879) was a Royal Navy officer who went on to be Fourth Naval Lord.

== Early life ==
Swynfen Thomas Carnegie was born the youngest son of Admiral William Carnegie, 7th Earl of Northesk and his wife Mary on 8 March 1813.

== Naval career ==
Carnegie joined the Royal Navy on 3 August 1826 as a midshipman on board the frigate HMS Undaunted. He later served in the same rank on the ship of the line HMS St Vincent, flag ship of Vice-Admiral Sir Henry Hotham, and the brig-sloop HMS Raleigh. He was promoted to lieutenant on 21 April 1832 and was appointed on 9 November to serve on the frigate HMS Castor, commanded by Commodore Lord John Hay, later moving with Hay to the post ship HMS North Star. In these ships he participated in the First Carlist War and was rewarded by Spain with the Order of San Fernando.

He was promoted to commander on 28 June 1838 and given command of the sloop HMS Orestes on 10 August 1842. He transferred to the steam sloop HMS Devastation in November 1843 and served with her until February 1844. Promoted to captain on 10 June 1845, he was given command of the frigate HMS Horatio.

Subsequently, he commanded the frigates HMS Tribune and HMS Leander in the Black Sea during the Crimean War. Later he commanded the ship of the line HMS Edinburgh before being appointed Fourth Naval Lord in 1859. He went on to be Captain of the ship of the line HMS Colossus in 1862 and Commodore of the Coast Guard Service at Harwich in 1863.

== Political career ==
He was Member of Parliament for Stafford from 1841 to 1847. In 1846, he briefly served as a Lord Commissioner of the Treasury.

== Personal life ==
In 1858 Carnegie married Albertine Louise, eldest daughter of John Adrian Hope, the second son of Thomas Hope. The couple divorced in 1872.

== Citations ==
Military offices
Preceded by Sir James Drummond	Fourth Naval Lord; 1859	Succeeded by Sir Alexander Milne, Bt
Parliament of the United Kingdom
Preceded by William Fawkener Chetwynd; Robert Farrand	Member of Parliament for Stafford; 1841–1847; With: Sir Edward Manningham-Buller, Bt	Succeeded by David Urquhart; Thomas Sidney
