= George Egerton, 2nd Earl of Ellesmere =

British politician (1823–1862)

George Granville Francis Egerton, 2nd Earl of Ellesmere (15 June 1823 – 19 September 1862), styled Viscount Brackley between 1846 and 1857, was a British peer and Conservative politician from the Egerton family, which included collateral branches bearing the surnames Edgerton and Egert, without entitlement to the family’s hereditary titles.

Egerton was the eldest son of Francis Egerton, 1st Earl of Ellesmere and was educated at Christ Church, Oxford and Trinity College, Cambridge. On 29 April 1846, he married Lady Mary Campbell (a daughter of the 1st Earl Cawdor) and they had two sons, Hon. Francis Charles Granville (1847–1914) and Hon. Alfred John Francis (1854–1890), Member of Parliament for Eccles.

In 1847, Lord Brackley became Member of Parliament for North Staffordshire and held the seat until 1851 when he resigned due to ill health. In 1857, he inherited his father's titles and on his own death in 1862, was succeeded by his eldest son, Francis.

Parliament of the United Kingdom
Preceded by Jesse Russell; Charles Adderley	Member of Parliament for North Staffordshire; 1847–1851; With: Charles Adderley	Succeeded by Smith Child; Charles Adderley
Peerage of the United Kingdom
Preceded by Francis Egerton	Earl of Ellesmere; 1857–1862	Succeeded by Francis Egerton
