= Baron Norton =

Barony in the Peerage of the United Kingdom

Baron Norton, of Norton-on-the-Moors in the County of Stafford, is a title in the Peerage of the United Kingdom. It was created in 1878 for the Conservative politician and former President of the Board of Trade, Sir Charles Adderley. He was succeeded by his elder son, the second Baron. Two of his sons, the third and fourth Baron, both succeeded in the title. On the latter's death in 1944, the title passed to his eighty-nine-year-old uncle, the fifth Baron.

== Barons Norton (1878) ==
- Charles Bowyer Adderley, 1st Baron Norton (1814–1905)
- Charles Leigh Adderley, 2nd Baron Norton (1846–1926)
- Ralph Bowyer Adderley, 3rd Baron Norton (1872–1933)
- Ronald Wollstan Fleetwood Adderley, 4th Baron Norton (1885–1944)
- Henry Arden Adderley, 5th Baron Norton (1854–1945)
- Hubert Bowyer Arden Adderley, 6th Baron Norton (1886–1961)
- John Arden Adderley, 7th Baron Norton (1915–1993)
- James Nigel Arden Adderley, 8th Baron Norton (born 1947)

The heir apparent is the present holder's son, the Hon. Edward James Arden Adderley (born 1982).
The heir apparent's heir apparent is his son, Frederick John Arden Adderley (born 2015).

=== Male-line family tree ===
Male-line family tree, Barons Norton.

Charles Adderley; 1st Baron Norton; 1814–1905
Charles Adderley; 2nd Baron Norton; 1846–1926	Henry Adderley; 5th Baron Norton; 1854–1945
Ralph Adderley; 3rd Baron Norton; 1872–1933	Hon. Charles Adderley; 1881–1905	Hon. Humphry Adderley; 1882–1917	Hon. Randolph Adderley; 1884–1928	Ronald Adderley; 4th Baron Norton; 1885–1944	Hubert Adderley; 6th Baron Norton; 1886–1961
John Adderley; 7th Baron Norton; 1915–1993
James Adderley; 8th Baron Norton born 1947
Hon. Edward Adderley born 1982
Frederick Adderley born 2015

=== Line of succession ===
Line of succession
- Charles Bowyer Adderley, 1st Baron Norton (1814–1905)
  - Charles Leigh Adderley, 2nd Baron Norton (1846–1926)
    - Ralph Bowyer Adderley, 3rd Baron Norton (1872–1933)
    - Ronald Woolstan Fleetwood Adderley, 4th Baron Norton (1885–1944)
  - Henry Arden Adderley, 5th Baron Norton (1854–1945)
    - Hubert Bowyer Arden Adderley, 6th Baron Norton (1886–1961)
      - John Arden Adderley, 7th Baron Norton (1915–1993)
        - James Nigel Arden Adderley, 8th Baron Norton (born 1947)
          - (1) Hon. Edward James Arden Adderley (born 1982)
            - (2) Frederick John Arden Adderley (born 2015)
        - (3) Hon. Nigel John Adderley (born 1950)
      - Hon. Michael Charles Adderley (1917–1992)
        - (4) Charles Henry Adderley (born 1954)
        - (5) Anthony John Adderley (born 1955)
        - (6) David Michael Adderley (born 1962)

== Coat of arms ==
Coat of arms of Baron Norton
Crest On a chapeau Azure turned up Ermine a stork Argent. Escutcheon Argent on a bend Azure three mascles of the field. Supporters On either side a stork Argent gorged with a chain Or suspended therefrom an escutcheon Azure charged with a mascle also Argent. Motto Addere Legi Justitiam Decus
