= Hugh Harrison (cricketer) =

Welsh cricketer and British Army officer

Personal information
- Full name: Hugh Robert Edward Harrison
- Born: 16 April 1875; Forden, Montgomeryshire, Wales
- Died: 15 May 1912 (aged 37); Folkestone, Kent, England
- Batting: Right-handed
- Bowling: Right-arm fast

Domestic team information
- Years: Team
- 1896–1897: Marylebone Cricket Club

Career statistics
Competition	First-class
Matches	4
Runs scored	123
Batting average	17.57
100s/50s	–/1
Top score	55
Balls bowled	110
Wickets	2
Bowling average	36.50
5 wickets in innings	–
10 wickets in match	–
Best bowling	2/47
Catches/stumpings	1/–
- Source: Cricinfo, 19 April 2021

Hugh Robert Edward Harrison JP (16 April 1875 – 15 May 1912) was a Welsh first-class cricketer and British Army officer.

The son of Robert Harrison, he was born at the Montgomeryshire village of Forden in April 1875 and was educated at Eton College, where he was in the cricket eleven. He served in the British Army with the South Wales Borderers, gaining the rank of lieutenant with them in August 1894. He played at county level below first-class for Shropshire between 1893 and 1896. He played first-class cricket for the Marylebone Cricket Club in 1896 and 1897, making four appearances. His four appearances yielded him 123 runs with a highest score of 55, in addition to two wickets with his right-arm fast bowling. He was transferred to the Grenadier Guards in October 1896, which saw him demoted to second lieutenant.

He was promoted back to lieutenant in September 1898, with promotion to captain following in February 1899, at which point he had returned to the South Wales Borderers. Harrison resigned his commission in February 1901. A sometime justice of the peace for Montgomeryshire, he suffered financial hardship in the latter years of his life, being declared bankrupt in November 1906. He was divorced from his wife, Evelyn Hester Miller, in January 1909 on account of "desertion and misconduct". They had been married since 1898. Harrison later died in England at Folkestone on 15 May 1912.
