= John Chetwynd-Talbot, 21st Earl of Shrewsbury =

British peer, Earl in 3 peerages

The Right Honourable The Earl of Shrewsbury
- The Earl of Shrewsbury in 1935

Lord High Steward of Ireland
- In office 1921–1980

Personal details
- Born: John George Charles Henry Alton Alexander Chetwynd Chetwynd-Talbot; 21 January 1914
- Died: 12 November 1980 (aged 66)
- Spouse(s): Nadine Crofton (m. 1936; div. 1963) Nina Mortlock (m. 1963; died 1980)
- Children: Charles Chetwynd-Talbot
- Relatives: Marquess of Anglesey (uncle); Charles Chetwynd-Talbot (grandfather)

John George Chetwynd-Talbot, 21st Earl of Shrewsbury, 21st Earl of Waterford, 6th Earl Talbot (21 January 1914 – 12 November 1980), styled Viscount of Ingestre from 1915 to 1921, was a British peer.

== Early life ==
He was the son of Charles John Alton Chetwynd-Talbot, Viscount of Ingestre (1882–1915), and Lady Winifred Constance Hester Paget. From his parents' marriage, he had three elder sisters, Lady Ursula Winifred Chetwynd-Talbot, Lady Victoria Audrey Beatrice Chetwynd-Talbot, and Lady Joan Chetwynd-Talbot. After his father's death, his mother married Richard Edmunds Pennoyer, son of Albert Adams Pennoyer and brother of Albert Pennoyer and Paul Pennoyer Sr.

His maternal grandparents were Lord Alexander Victor Paget (third son of the 2nd Marquess of Anglesey) and Hon. Hester Alice Stapleton-Cotton (a daughter of Col. Wellington Stapleton-Cotton, 2nd Viscount Combermere). His maternal uncle was Charles Paget, 6th Marquess of Anglesey.

He inherited the title Earl of Shrewsbury when his grandfather Charles Chetwynd-Talbot, 20th Earl of Shrewsbury, died in 1921.

== Career ==
Shrewsbury was the Honorary Air Commodore of No. 3509 (Staffordshire) Fighter Control Unit before it was disbanded on 11 May 1957.

== Personal life ==
He married his first wife, Nadine Muriel Crofton (1913–2003), in 1936. Together, Nadine and Lord Shrewsbury had six children. They had four daughters before the birth of an heir, Charles.

- Lady Charlotte Sarah Alexandra Chetwynd-Talbot (b. 1938), who married Camillo Cavazza dei Conti Cavazza, son of Count Alessandro Cavazza of Isola del Garda and Princess Livia Borghese.
- Lady (Josephine) Sylvia-Rose Chetwynd-Talbot (b. 1940), who married Stafford Antony Saint.
- Lady Catherine Laura Chetwynd-Talbot (b. 1945), who married Richard Sebastian Endicott Chamberlain, a grandson of Sir Joseph Austen Chamberlain.
- Lady Marguerite Mary Chetwynd-Talbot (b. 1950), who married Guy William Brisbane.
- Charles Henry John Benedict Crofton Chetwynd Chetwynd-Talbot, Viscount Ingestre (born 1952), married Deborah Jane Hutchinson.
- Hon. Paul Anthony Alexander Bueno Chetwynd-Talbot (b. 1957), who married Sarah Elizabeth Bradley, granddaughter of Thomas Brand, 3rd Viscount Hampden.

He sued for divorce in 1958, but in 1959 judge Charles A. Collingwood rejected the divorce suit. In a subsequent proceeding in 1963, a divorce was granted.

Thereafter, Lord Shrewsbury married his second wife, Doris Aileen "Nina" Mortlock, on 18 October 1963. Nina was a daughter of Sandes Alexander Mortlock.

Upon his death, his eldest son Charles succeeded to Lord Shrewsbury's titles. His widow died in 1993.

Honorary titles
Preceded by The Earl of Shrewsbury	Lord High Steward of Ireland; 1921–1980	Succeeded by The Earl of Shrewsbury
Peerage of England
Preceded by Charles Chetwynd-Talbot	Earl of Shrewsbury; 1921–1980	Succeeded by Charles Chetwynd-Talbot
Peerage of Ireland
Preceded by Charles Chetwynd-Talbot	Earl of Waterford; 1921–1980	Succeeded by Charles Chetwynd-Talbot
Peerage of Great Britain
Preceded by Charles Chetwynd-Talbot	Earl Talbot; 1921–1980	Succeeded by Charles Chetwynd-Talbot
