= Charles Chetwynd-Talbot, 19th Earl of Shrewsbury =

British Conservative politician

The Right Honourable The Earl of Shrewsbury PC
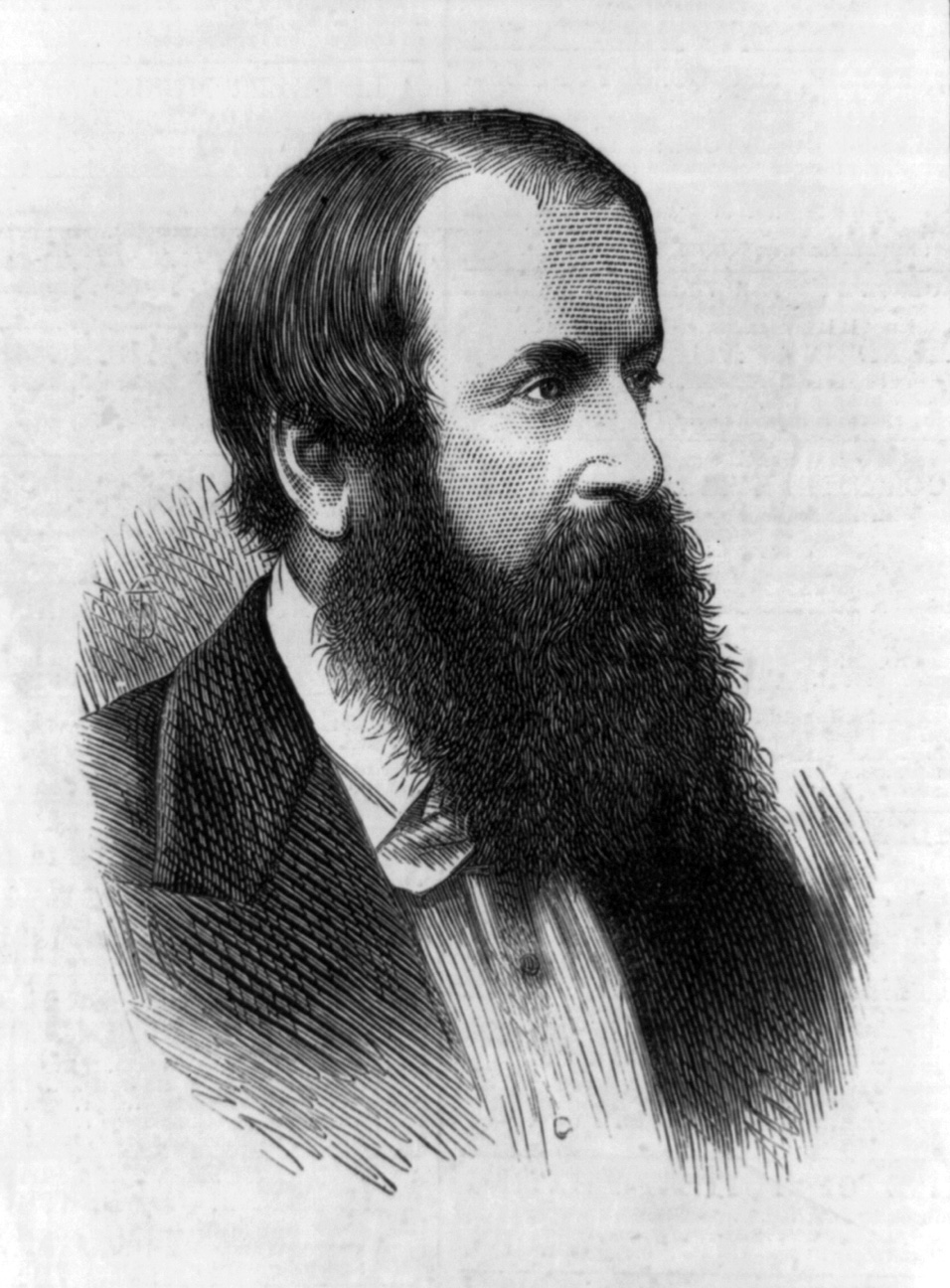

Captain of the Honourable Corps of Gentlemen-at-Arms
- In office 4 February 1875 – 11 May 1877
- Monarch: Victoria
- Prime Minister: Benjamin Disraeli
- Preceded by: The Marquess of Exeter
- Succeeded by: The Earl of Coventry

Personal details
- Born: 13 April 1830
- Died: 11 May 1877 (aged 47)
- Party: Conservative
- Spouse(s): Theresa Cockerell (1836–1912)
- Children: Theresa Vane-Tempest-Stewart, Marchioness of Londonderry; Lady Guendolen Little; Muriel, Viscountess Helmsley; Charles Chetwynd-Talbot, 20th Earl of Shrewsbury
- Parent(s): Henry Chetwynd-Talbot, 18th Earl of Shrewsbury; Lady Sarah Elizabeth Beresford

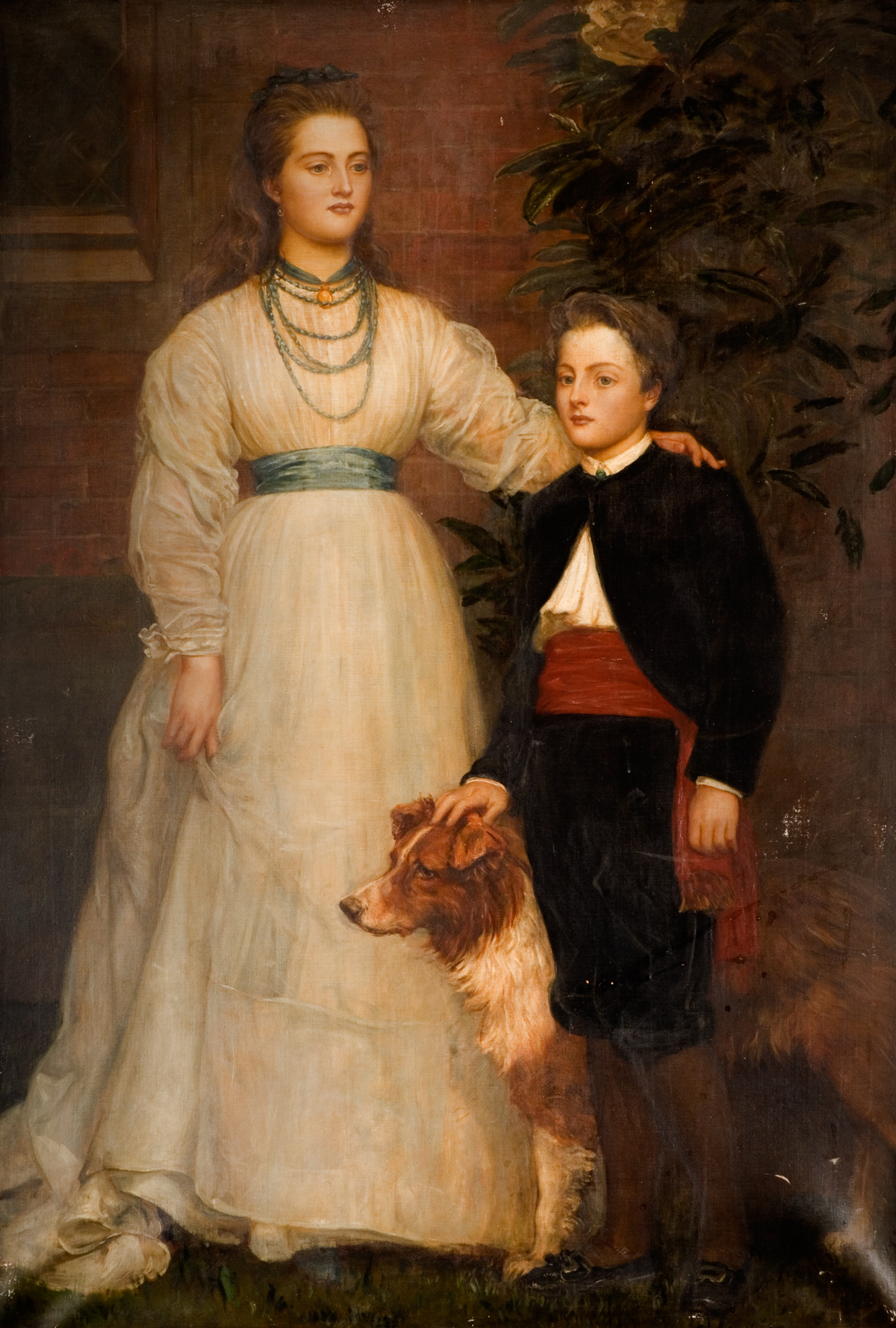
Portrait of his children Theresa and Charles

Charles John Chetwynd-Talbot, 19th Earl of Shrewsbury, 19th Earl of Waterford, 4th Earl Talbot, PC (13 April 1830 – 11 May 1877), styled Viscount Ingestre between 1849 and 1868, was a British Conservative politician. He served as Captain of the Honourable Corps of Gentlemen-at-Arms under Benjamin Disraeli between 1875 and 1877.

== Early life ==
Chetwynd-Talbot was the eldest son of Admiral Henry Chetwynd-Talbot, 18th Earl of Shrewsbury, and Lady Sarah Elizabeth Beresford, daughter of Henry Beresford, 2nd Marquess of Waterford.

== Career ==
On 22 May 1849, he was commissioned a lieutenant in the Staffordshire Yeomanry. He purchased a commission as cornet & sub-lieutenant in the 1st Regiment of Life Guards on 17 January 1851. Ingestre was promoted to a captaincy in the Yeomanry on 25 March 1851, and purchased a lieutenancy in the Life Guards on 5 August 1853. He resigned his Life Guards commission in late 1854, but remained in the Staffordshire Yeomanry, in which he was promoted to major on 13 July 1864. On 1 November 1856, he was appointed a deputy lieutenant of Staffordshire.

=== Political career ===
Ingestre entered the House of Commons as one of two representatives for Stafford in 1857, a seat he held until 1859, and later represented Staffordshire North from 1859 to 1865. On 13 July 1864, he was promoted to major in the Staffordshire Yeomanry. He represented Stamford in 1868. The latter year he succeeded his father in the earldom. He resigned his Yeomanry commission on 14 April 1875, and served from 1875 to 1877 as Captain of the Honourable Corps of Gentlemen-at-Arms in the second Conservative administration of Benjamin Disraeli and was sworn of the Privy Council in 1874.

== Personal life ==
Lord Shrewsbury married Anna Theresa Cockerell (1836–1912), daughter of Captain Richard Howe Cockerell RN (d 1839 Calcutta) by his wife Theresa Newcomen, later Lady Eglinton, in 1855. The new Lady Shrewsbury was stepdaughter to the 13th Earl, and half-sister to the 14th and 15th Earls. Together, they had four children:

- Lady Theresa Susey Helen Chetwynd-Talbot (1856–1919), who married the 6th Marquess of Londonderry, and was the mother of the 7th Marquess.
- Lady Guendolen Theresa Chetwynd-Talbot (–1937), who married Col. Edward Chaplin, son of Rev. Henry Chaplin and brother of the 1st Viscount Chaplin, in 1877. After his death in 1883, she married Maj. Archibald Cosmo Little, son of Gen. Sir Archibald Little and Jane Orme, in 1887.
- Lady Muriel Frances Louisa Chetwynd-Talbot (1859–1925), who was active in the Garden City movement; she married William Duncombe, Viscount Helmsley, and was the mother of the second Earl of Feversham.
- Charles Henry John Chetwynd-Talbot, 20th Earl of Shrewsbury (1860–1921), who eloped with Ellen Palmer-Morewood Mundy in 1882.

Shrewsbury died suddenly in May 1877, aged only 47, and was succeeded in the earldom by his only legitimate son Charles. The Countess of Shrewsbury died in July 1912, aged 76.

Lord Shrewsbury also had an illegitimate child with a maid, producing a son. The son was educated through funding from Lord Shrewsbury. Lord Shrewsbury's illegitimate grandson Arthur Talbot won the Croix de Guerre during the First World War, saving a Padre from behind enemy lines, despite only being a medic.

== Ancestry ==
Ancestry of Charles Chetwynd-Talbot, 19th Earl of Shrewsbury

8. John Chetwynd-Talbot, 1st Earl Talbot
4. Charles Chetwynd-Talbot, 2nd Earl Talbot
9. Lady Charlotte Hill, Countess Talbot
2. Henry Chetwynd-Talbot, 18th Earl of Shrewsbury
10. Charles Lambart
5. Lady Frances Thomasine Lambart, Countess Talbot
11. Frances Dutton
1. Charles Chetwynd-Talbot, 19th Earl of Shrewsbury
12. George Beresford, 1st Marquess of Waterford
6. Henry Beresford, 2nd Marquess of Waterford
13. Elizabeth Monck, Marchioness of Waterford
3. Lady Sarah Elizabeth Beresford, Countess of Shrewsbury
14. George Carpenter, 2nd Earl of Tyrconnell
7. Susanna Carpenter, Marchioness of Waterford
15. Lady Sarah Hussey Delaval, Countess of Tyrconnell

Parliament of the United Kingdom
Preceded by John Ayshford Wise; Arthur Otway	Member of Parliament for Stafford; 1857–1859; With: John Ayshford Wise	Succeeded by John Ayshford Wise; Thomas Salt
Preceded by Charles Adderley; Smith Child	Member of Parliament for Staffordshire North; 1859–1865; With: Charles Adderley	Succeeded by Charles Adderley; Edward Manningham-Buller
Preceded by Viscount Cranborne; Sir John Dalrymple Hay, Bt	Member of Parliament for Stamford; 1868; With: Sir John Dalrymple Hay, Bt	Succeeded by Sir John Dalrymple Hay, Bt; William Unwin Heygate
Political offices
Preceded by The Marquess of Exeter	Captain of the Honourable Corps of Gentlemen-at-Arms; 1875–1877	Succeeded by The Earl of Coventry
Honorary titles
Preceded by The Earl of Shrewsbury	Lord High Steward of Ireland; 1868–1877	Succeeded by The Earl of Shrewsbury
Peerage of England
Preceded by Henry Chetwynd-Talbot	Earl of Shrewsbury; 1868–1877	Succeeded by Charles Chetwynd-Talbot
Peerage of Ireland
Preceded by Henry Chetwynd-Talbot	Earl of Waterford; 1868–1877	Succeeded by Charles Chetwynd-Talbot
Peerage of Great Britain
Preceded by Henry Chetwynd-Talbot	Earl Talbot; 1868–1877	Succeeded by Charles Chetwynd-Talbot
