= Charles Chetwynd-Talbot, 22nd Earl of Shrewsbury =

English peer (born 1952)

The Right Honourable The Earl of Shrewsbury DL
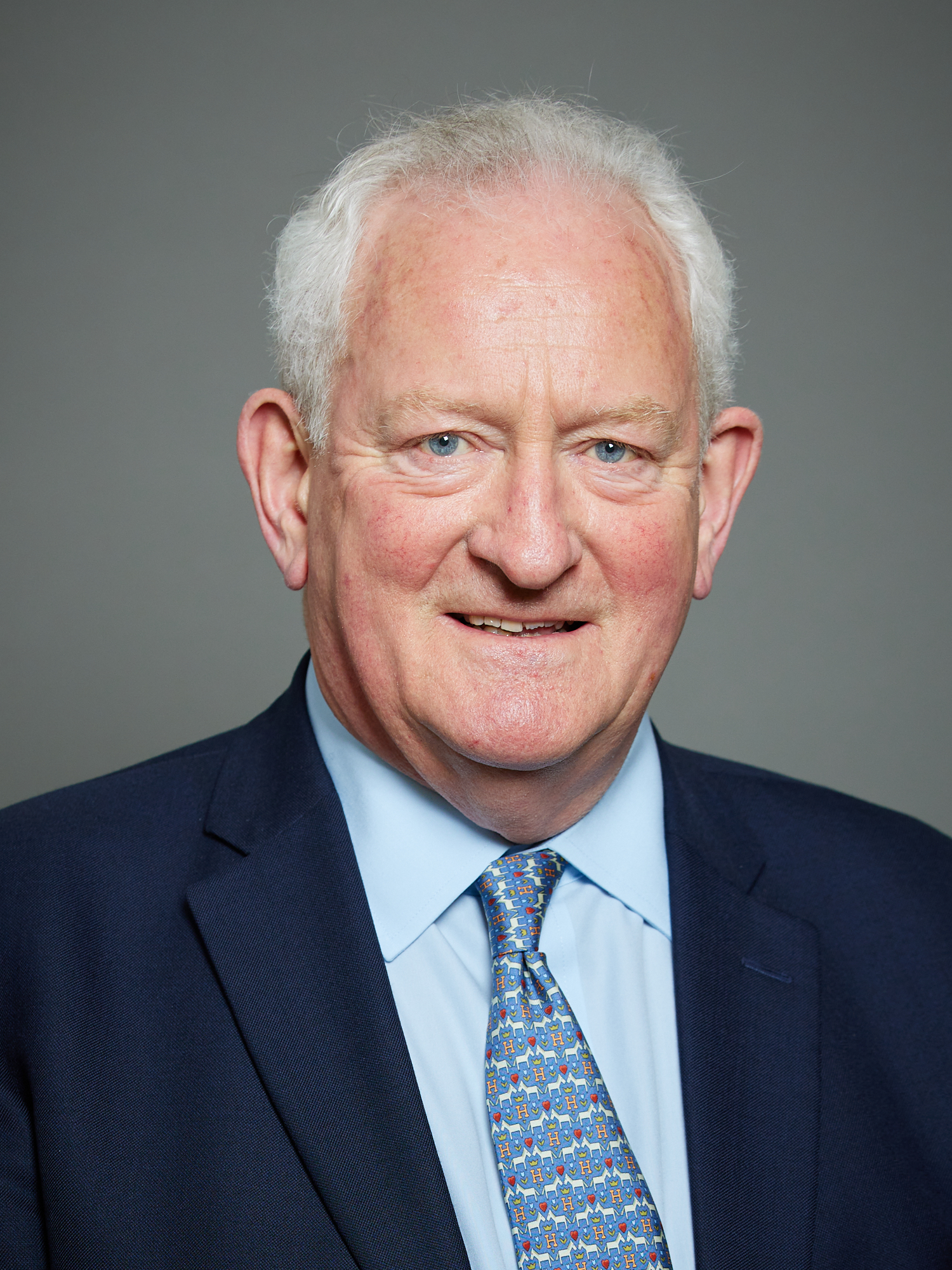
- Official portrait, 2022

Lord High Steward of Ireland
- Incumbent
- Assumed office 12 November 1980

Member of the House of Lords
- Lord Temporal
- Hereditary peerage 16 February 1981 – 11 November 1999
- Preceded by: The 21st Earl of Shrewsbury
- Succeeded by: Seat abolished
- Elected Hereditary Peer; 11 November 1999 – 29 April 2026
- Election: 1999
- Preceded by: Seat established
- Succeeded by: Seat abolished

Personal details
- Born: Charles Henry John Benedict Crofton Chetwynd Chetwynd-Talbot; 18 December 1952 (age 73) Ingestre Hall, Staffordshire
- Party: Independent (2022–2026)
- Other political affiliations: Conservative (1999–2022)
- Spouse: Deborah Jane Hutchinson (m. 1973)
- Children: 3
- Parent(s): John Chetwynd-Talbot, 21st Earl of Shrewsbury; Nadine Crofton
- Education: Harrow School

Charles Henry John Benedict Crofton Chetwynd Chetwynd-Talbot, 22nd Earl of Shrewsbury (born 18 December 1952), styled Viscount Ingestre until 1980, is an English aristocrat. He is the premier earl in the Peerage of England as the Earl of Shrewsbury (created 1442). He also holds the titles of Earl of Waterford, Earl Talbot and Baron Talbot. He was a peer in the House of Lords until the abolition of hereditary peers in April 2026.

== Irish titles ==
He is an earl in the Peerage of Ireland as the Earl of Waterford, the oldest earldom in that peerage held by someone with no higher title (1446). He also holds the title of Lord High Steward of Ireland.

== Background and education ==
Shrewsbury is the fifth child and eldest son of John Chetwynd-Talbot, 21st Earl of Shrewsbury, and his first wife, Nadine Crofton, a daughter of Brigadier General Cyril Randell Crofton. Prince Henry, Duke of Gloucester, was his godfather. His parents divorced in 1963. He was educated at Harrow School.

He is descended from John Talbot, 1st Earl of Shrewsbury, 1st Earl of Waterford, 7th Baron Talbot KG (c. 1387–1453), an English military commander of the Hundred Years' War.

== Career ==
Shrewsbury joined the House of Lords when he succeeded to his father's peerages in 1980, at that time enjoying the automatic right to sit in parliament. He lost the right as a result of the reforms of the House of Lords Act 1999, but was then one of the 92 hereditary peers elected at that time to sit in the Lords. He has served as a whip for the Conservatives.

From 1992 to 1998, Shrewsbury was the first chancellor of the University of Wolverhampton and was awarded an honorary degree of Doctor of Laws.

In 1994 he was appointed a Deputy to the Lord Lieutenant of Staffordshire, Sir James Hawley.

He is High Steward of Sheffield Cathedral, a former president of the Staffordshire Historic Churches Trust, patron or honorary president of a number of charities or voluntary bodies, and patron of ten Church of England benefices.

An enthusiastic supporter of country sports, Shrewsbury is a former president of the Gun Trade Association and remains deputy-chairman of the Standing Conference on Country Sports. He is a liveryman of three City of London livery companies: the companies of Weavers, Gunmakers and Blacksmiths. He is a former chairman of the Firearms Consultative Committee at the Home Office, and former chairman and president of the British Shooting Sports Council. Shrewsbury has derived additional income by divesting himself of manorial titles through auction houses, a practice which has brought him into the public eye.

He retired as director and deputy chairman of the Britannia Building Society and then was appointed as president of the Building Societies Association.

== Breaches of parliamentary standards ==
In April 2022, the House of Lords Commissioners for Standards began an investigation into an allegation that Shrewsbury had failed to comply with rules preventing peers from profiting financially from their membership of the Lords. He was largely exonerated in May, when the Commissioners concluded that he was guilty of a minor breach of the peers' Code of Conduct and ordered him to write a letter of apology.

In August 2022, the House of Lords Commissioners for Standards launched a second investigation into Shrewsbury's dealings with SpectrumX, a healthcare firm that had paid him £3,000 a month between the summer of 2020 and January 2022, after leaked documents revealed that he had boasted of "very considerable" potential to open doors for SpectrumX, through what he described as his "high-level contacts".

In September 2022, the Office of the Registrar of Consultant Lobbyists concluded that Shrewsbury had failed to register his company, Talbot Consulting Ltd, before contacting Lady Barran, a junior minister at the Department for Culture Media and Sport, and Alex Burghart, a junior education minister, regarding SpectrumX. The registrar found that Shrewsbury had contravened the Transparency of Lobbying, Non-Party Campaigning and Trade Union Administration Act 2014. In October 2022, it was revealed that Shrewsbury had failed to register that he was being paid by SpectrumX. This contradicted his earlier claims that he had reported his financial interest when promoting a SpectrumX product in 2021.

On 16 December 2022, the House of Lords Conduct Committee recommended that he be suspended from the House of Lords for nine months after being paid £57,000 over two years to lobby ministers and officials, which was described as "extremely serious" misconduct that damaged the reputation of the House of Lords.

In January 2026, Shrewsbury was suspended from the House of Lords for two weeks for making false travel expenses claims and using a House of Lords rail season ticket for non-parliamentary business.

== Family ==
On 5 January 1973, Shrewsbury married Deborah Jane Hutchinson, a daughter of Noel Staughton Hutchinson and Jenifer Hutchinson of Ellerton, Shropshire. They have three children:

- Lady Victoria Chetwynd-Talbot (born 7 September 1975). Married Daniel Goodall in 2005 and has one child,
  - Charles Goodall (born 15 September 2006)
- James Chetwynd-Talbot, Viscount Ingestre (born 11 January 1978). Married Polly Blackie of Debden, Essex, in 2006, and has four children:
  - The Hon. Matilda Chetwynd-Talbot (born 3 November 2008)
  - The Hon. Rose Chetwynd-Talbot (born 20 February 2010)
  - The Hon. Flora Chetwynd-Talbot (born 30 September 2011)
  - The Hon. George Chetwynd-Talbot (born 3 May 2013)
- The Hon. Edward Chetwynd-Talbot (born 18 September 1981). Married Rosie Myers of Scamblesby, Lincolnshire, in 2010; has one child:
  - Jemima Grey Chetwynd-Talbot

Shrewsbury and his family live near Ashbourne in Derbyshire – a house a few yards into Staffordshire. Lady Shrewsbury was High Sheriff of Staffordshire in 2001–2002.

== Arms ==
Coat of arms of Charles Chetwynd-Talbot, 22nd Earl of Shrewsbury
| Coronet A Coronet of an Earl Crest 1st: on a Chapeau Gules turned up Ermine a Lion statant with the tail extended Or (Talbot); 2nd: a Goat's Head erased Argent attired Or (Chetwynd) Escutcheon Quarterly: 1st and 4th, Gules a Lion rampant within a Bordure engrailed Or (Talbot); 2nd and 3rd, Azure a Chevron between three Mullets Or (Chetwynd) Supporters On either side a Talbot Argent Motto Prest d'Accomplir ("Ready to accomplish") |

Honorary titles
| Preceded by The Earl of Shrewsbury | Lord High Steward of Ireland; 1980–present | Incumbent |
Peerage of England
| Preceded by John Chetwynd-Talbot | Earl of Shrewsbury; 1980–present Member of the House of Lords (1981–1999) | Incumbent; Heir apparent: James Chetwynd-Talbot, Viscount Ingestre |
Peerage of Ireland
| Preceded by John Chetwynd-Talbot | Earl of Waterford; 1980–present | Incumbent; Heir apparent: James Chetwynd-Talbot, Viscount Ingestre |
Peerage of Great Britain
| Preceded by John Chetwynd-Talbot | Earl Talbot; 1980–present | Incumbent; Heir apparent: James Chetwynd-Talbot, Viscount Ingestre |
Parliament of the United Kingdom
| New office created by the House of Lords Act 1999 | Elected hereditary peer to the House of Lords under the House of Lords Act 1999; 1999–2026 | Office abolished under the House of Lords (Hereditary Peers) Act 2026 |
Orders of precedence in the United Kingdom
| Preceded by Earl of Southesk | Gentlemen | Succeeded by The Earl of Derby |
