= Charles Adderley, 1st Baron Norton =

British politician (1814–1905)

The Right Honourable The Lord Norton KCMG PC DL JP
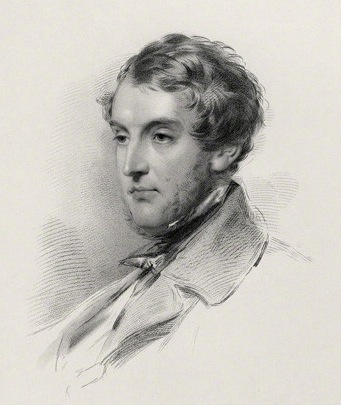

President of the Board of Health
- In office 8 March 1858 – 1 September 1858
- Monarch: Victoria
- Prime Minister: The Earl of Derby
- Preceded by: Hon. William Cowper
- Succeeded by: Office abolished

Under-Secretary of State for the Colonies
- In office 6 July 1866 – 1 December 1868
- Monarch: Victoria
- Prime Minister: The Earl of Derby; Benjamin Disraeli
- Preceded by: William Edward Forster
- Succeeded by: William Monsell

President of the Board of Trade
- In office 21 February 1874 – 4 April 1878
- Monarch: Victoria
- Prime Minister: Benjamin Disraeli
- Preceded by: Chichester Parkinson-Fortescue
- Succeeded by: Viscount Sandon

Personal details
- Born: 2 August 1814
- Died: 28 March 1905 (aged 90)
- Party: Conservative
- Spouse(s): Hon. Julia Leigh (1820–1887)
- Education: Christ Church, Oxford

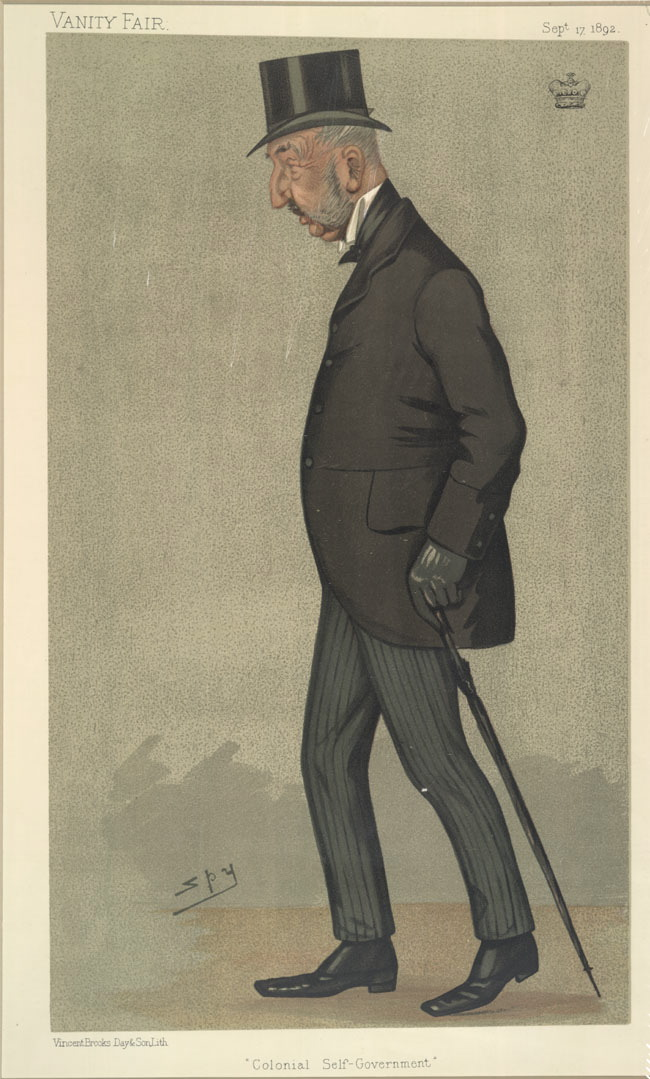
"Colonial Self-Government". Caricature by Spy published in Vanity Fair in 1892.

Charles Bowyer Adderley, 1st Baron Norton KCMG PC DL JP (2 August 1814 – 28 March 1905) was a British Conservative politician.

== Background and education ==
Charles Bowyer Adderley was the eldest son of Charles Clement Adderley (d. 1818), offspring of an old Staffordshire family, and his wife, daughter of Sir Edmund Cradock-Hartopp, 1st Baronet. Adderley inherited Hams Hall, Warwickshire, and the valuable estates of his great-uncle, Charles Bowyer Adderley, in 1826. He was educated at Christ Church, Oxford, where he graduated with a Bachelor of Arts in 1838.

== Political career ==
In 1841, Adderley entered the House of Commons as Member of Parliament for North Staffordshire, retaining his seat until 1878, when he was created Baron Norton.

Adderley's ministerial career began in 1858, when he was appointed President of the Board of Health and Vice-president of the Committee of the Council on Education in Lord Derby's short ministry. Again under Lord Derby, he was Under-Secretary of State for the Colonies from 1866 to 1868, being in charge of the act which created the new Dominion of Canada, and from 1874 to 1878, he was President of the Board of Trade.

He was sworn of the Privy Council in 1858, was appointed a Knight Commander of the Order of St Michael and St George (KCMG) in the 1869 Birthday Honours, and, in 1878, he was elevated to the peerage as Baron Norton, of Norton-on-the-Moors in the County of Stafford.

Norton was a strong churchman and especially interested in education and the colonies. He joined the Canterbury Association on 27 March 1848 and was a member of the management committee from the beginning. In 1852/53, he paid £500 towards the costs of the closure of the association.

Sir Charles Adderley and John Arthur Roebuck were ridiculed by Matthew Arnold for their English complacency.

== Family ==
In 1842 he married Julia Anne Eliza (1820–1887), oldest daughter of Chandos Leigh, 1st Baron Leigh, by whom he had several sons. His eldest son Charles Leigh Adderley succeeded him in the barony. Another son, the Hon. James Granville Adderley, vicar of Saltley, became well known as an advocate of Christian socialism. His daughter Isabel married in 1876 Vauncey Harpur Crewe of Calke Abbey, later 10th Baronet.

== Tributes ==
Adderley Street is a famous street in Cape Town, South Africa, considered the main street of the central business district. In 1850, the Mayor of Cape Town, Hercules Jarvis, named it to honour Adderley who had fought successfully against a proposal to make Cape Town into a penal colony.

In Birmingham, Adderley donated 8 acres (0.032 km^{2}) of land to create Adderley Park, which he managed privately from 1855 to 1864. He also donated land for the construction of St Saviour's Church, Saltley, St Peter's College, Saltley and the reformatory on the Fordrough, later called Norton Boys' Home. In 1879 Lord Norton sold Whitacre Lodge to the city for the construction of the 80 acres (0.32 km^{2}) Shustoke Reservoir, the largest single source of water for Birmingham until the Elan/Claerwen scheme was completed.

In Uppingham, Rutland, where he owned property, both Adderley Street and Norton Street are named after him.

Adderley Head, a headland between Lyttelton Harbour and Port Levy, near Canterbury, New Zealand, is named after him.

== Arms ==
Coat of arms of Charles Adderley, 1st Baron Norton
| Crest On a chapeau Azure turned up Ermine a stork Argent. Escutcheon Argent on a bend Azure three mascles of the field. Supporters On either side a stork Argent gorged with a chain Or suspended therefrom an escutcheon Azure charged with a mascle also Argent. Motto Addere Legi Justitiam Decus ("It is an honour to combine law and justice.") |

Parliament of the United Kingdom
| Preceded by Edward Manningham-Buller; Hon. Bingham Baring | Member of Parliament for Staffordshire North; 1841–1878; With: Jesse David Watts Russell 1841–1847; Viscount Brackley 1847–1851; Smith Child 1851–1859; Viscount Ingestre 1859–1865; Edward Manningham-Buller 1865–1874; Colin Minton Campbell 1874–1880 | Succeeded by Robert William Hanbury; Colin Minton Campbell |
Political offices
| Preceded by Hon. William Cowper | President of the Board of Health; 1858 | Office abolished |
| Preceded by Hon. William Cowper | Vice-President of the Committee on Education; 1858 | Succeeded by Robert Lowe |
| Preceded by William Edward Forster | Under-Secretary of State for the Colonies; 1866–1868 | Succeeded by William Monsell |
| Preceded by Chichester Parkinson-Fortescue | President of the Board of Trade; 1874–1878 | Succeeded by Viscount Sandon |
Peerage of the United Kingdom
| New creation | Baron Norton; 1878–1905 | Succeeded by Charles Leigh Adderley |
