= Colin Minton Campbell =

19th-century British Justice of the Peace

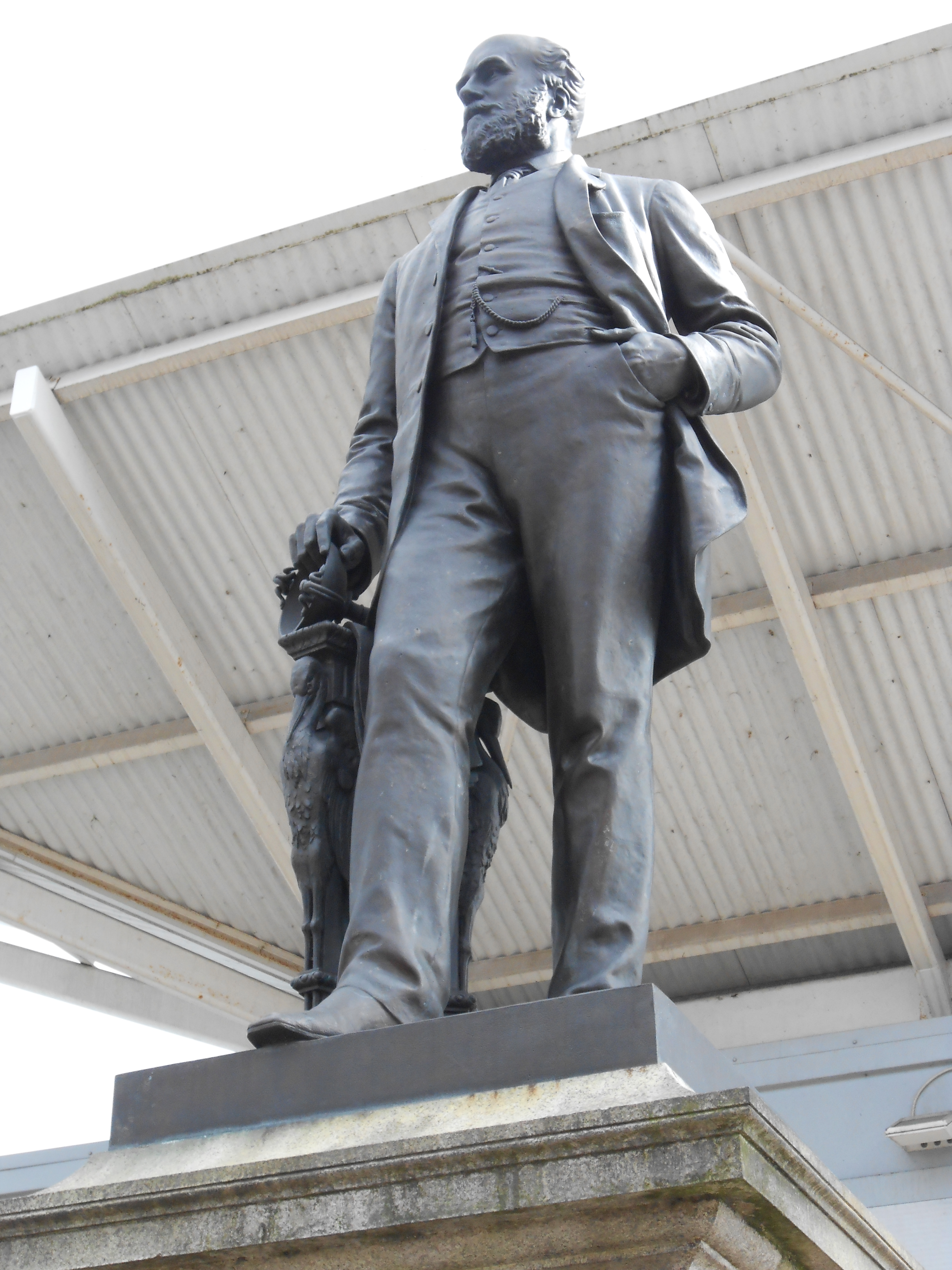
Statue in Stoke-on-Trent, by Sir Thomas Brock.

Colin Minton Campbell (1827–1885), of Woodseat in Staffordshire, was a British businessman and Member of Parliament. On the death of his uncle Herbert Minton in 1858, Colin Minton Campbell took over leadership of the family company Mintons, a leading firm making Staffordshire pottery of many kinds in Stoke-on-Trent.

== Biography ==
Campbell was born on 27 August 1827, the son of John Campbell of Liverpool by his wife Mary, daughter of Thomas Minton of Stoke-upon-Trent. He joined the Mintons partnership in 1849, with a 1/3 share. His uncle Herbert had decreased his involvement in day-to-day management in the years before his death in 1858, and Campbell was probably effectively in charge. Mintons retained its leading position during his period in charge, continuing to innovate.

He served as a justice of the peace for Derbyshire, as a deputy lieutenant, and as High Sheriff of Staffordshire in 1869. He represented North Staffordshire in Parliament from 1874 to 1880. He was mayor of Stoke from 1880 to 1883, and chairman of the North Staffordshire Railway Company from 1873 until 1883.

On 3 August 1853 Campbell married Louisa Wilmot, daughter of the Rev. William A. Cave-Browne-Cave of Stretton en le Field. Their son John Fitzherbert Campbell was born in 1861 and succeeded to Woodseat on his father's death in 1885.
