= Ralph Sadleir =

English landowner (1579–1661)

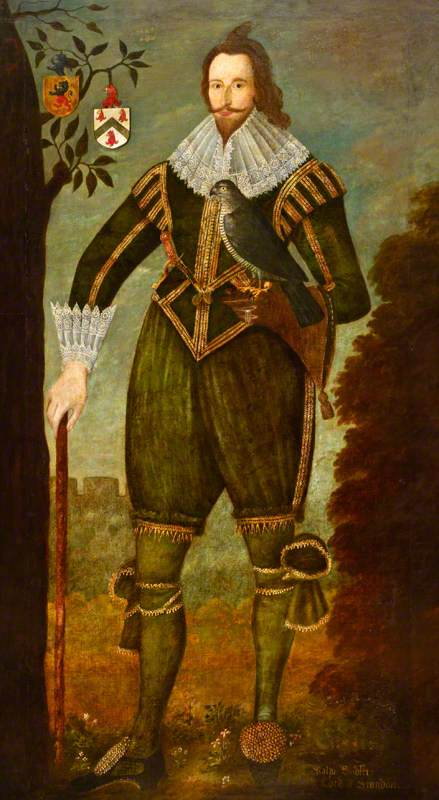
- Ralph Sadleir, c. 1615 – 1625, British (English) School (Sutton House)
- Born: 1579; Standon, Hertfordshire
- Died: 12 February 1661 (aged 81–82)
- Resting place: St. Mary's Church, Standon, Hertfordshire; 51.881111°N 0.027222°E
- Occupation: Landowner
- Spouse: Anne Coke (m. 1601)
- Parents: Sir Thomas Sadleir; Gertrude Markham
- Family: Sadleir

Ralph Sadleir (1579 – 12 February 1661) of Standon, Hertfordshire was an English landowner. He was Sheriff of Hertfordshire in 1609.

== Life ==
He was the only son, and heir, of Sir Thomas Sadleir (c. 1536 – 1607), lord of the manor of Standon, by his second wife, Gertrude, daughter of Robert Markham, of Cotham, Nottinghamshire.

=== Marriage ===
On 13 September 1601, at Burghley House in Lincolnshire, he married Anne Coke (1585 – c. 1671), the eldest daughter of Sir Edward Coke (1552 – 1634) and his first wife, Bridget Paston (d. 1598), daughter of John Paston of Norwich. Standon Lordship, the manor house where the couple lived after their marriage, was built for his grandfather and namesake, the statesman, Sir Ralph Sadler (or Sadleir) (1507 – 1587).

Sadleir delighted in hawking, hunting and the pleasures of country life; was famous for his noble table, his hospitality to his neighbours, and his charity to the poor. Isaac Walton in his "The Compleat Angler" noted how Sadleir was attached to the diversion of hunting. "To-morrow morning we will meet a pack of otter dogs of noble Mr. Sadler's, upon Amwell Hill, who will be there so early, that they intend to prevent the sun rising." In Walton's account, hounds met an hour before sunrise. Ralph Sadleir states that he will have the otter's skin, worth 10 shillings, for gloves "the best defence against wet weather". The otterhound pack that Ralph established evolved into the Essex Otter Hounds eventually becoming, through amalgamation, the Eastern Counties Otter Hounds, then the Eastern Counties Mink Hounds, following the ban on otter hunting, still in existence as the Eastern Counties Mink Hunt.

== Death ==
He died without issue on 12 February 1661 and was buried in the parish church at Standon. His death brought to an end the male line of the Sadleir family. On 5 March an inventory "of all and singular the Goods, Chattells, and Debts of Ralph Sadler, late of Stondon Lordship, in the County of Hertford, Esq. deceased" was taken. The Standon estate was inherited by his nephew, Walter (1609 – 1678), eldest surviving son of his sister, Gertrude, who married Walter Aston, 1st Lord Aston of Forfar (1584 – 1639). His widow continued to live at Standon until her death in late 1671 or early 1672.

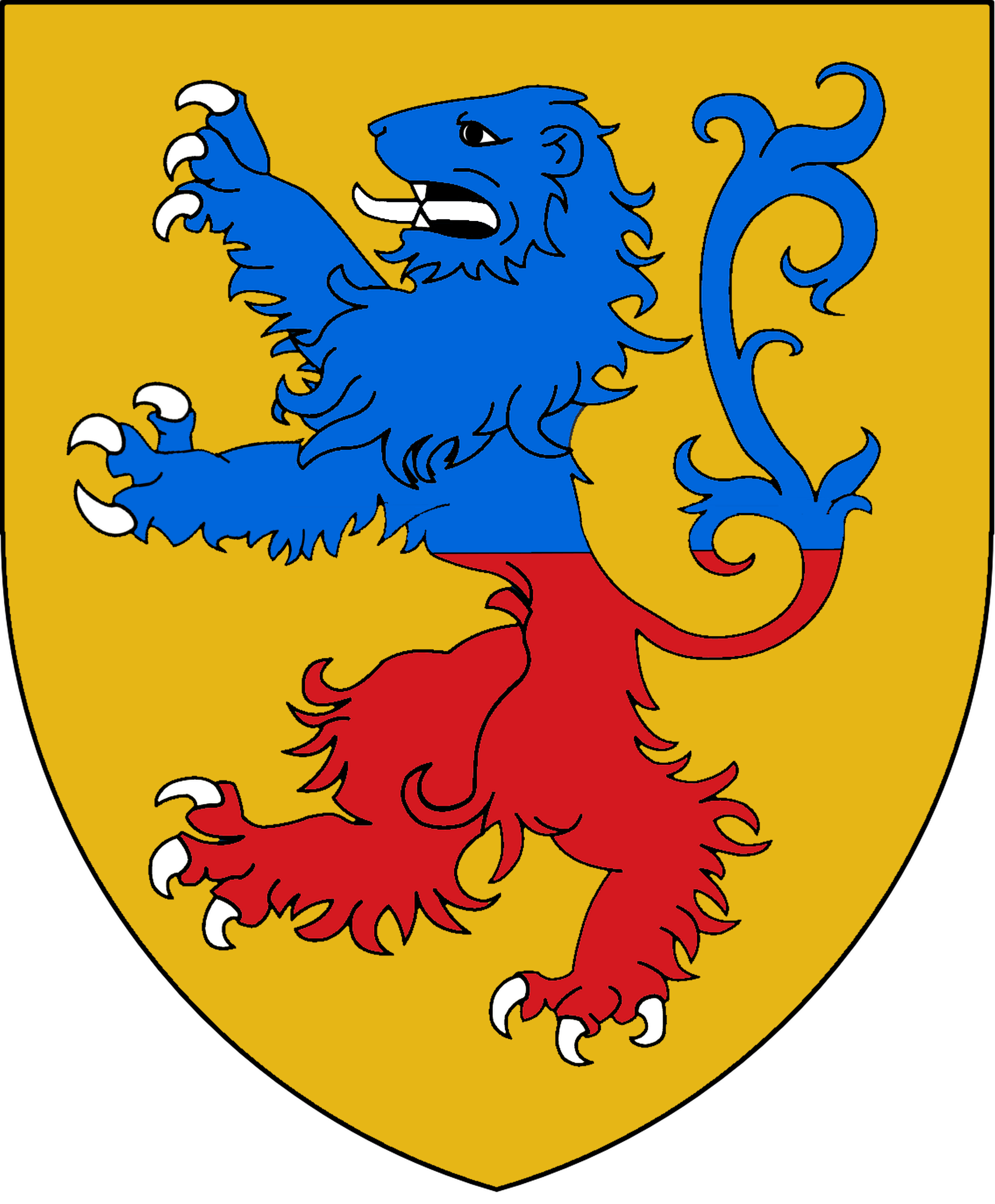
Arms of Sadleir of Standon

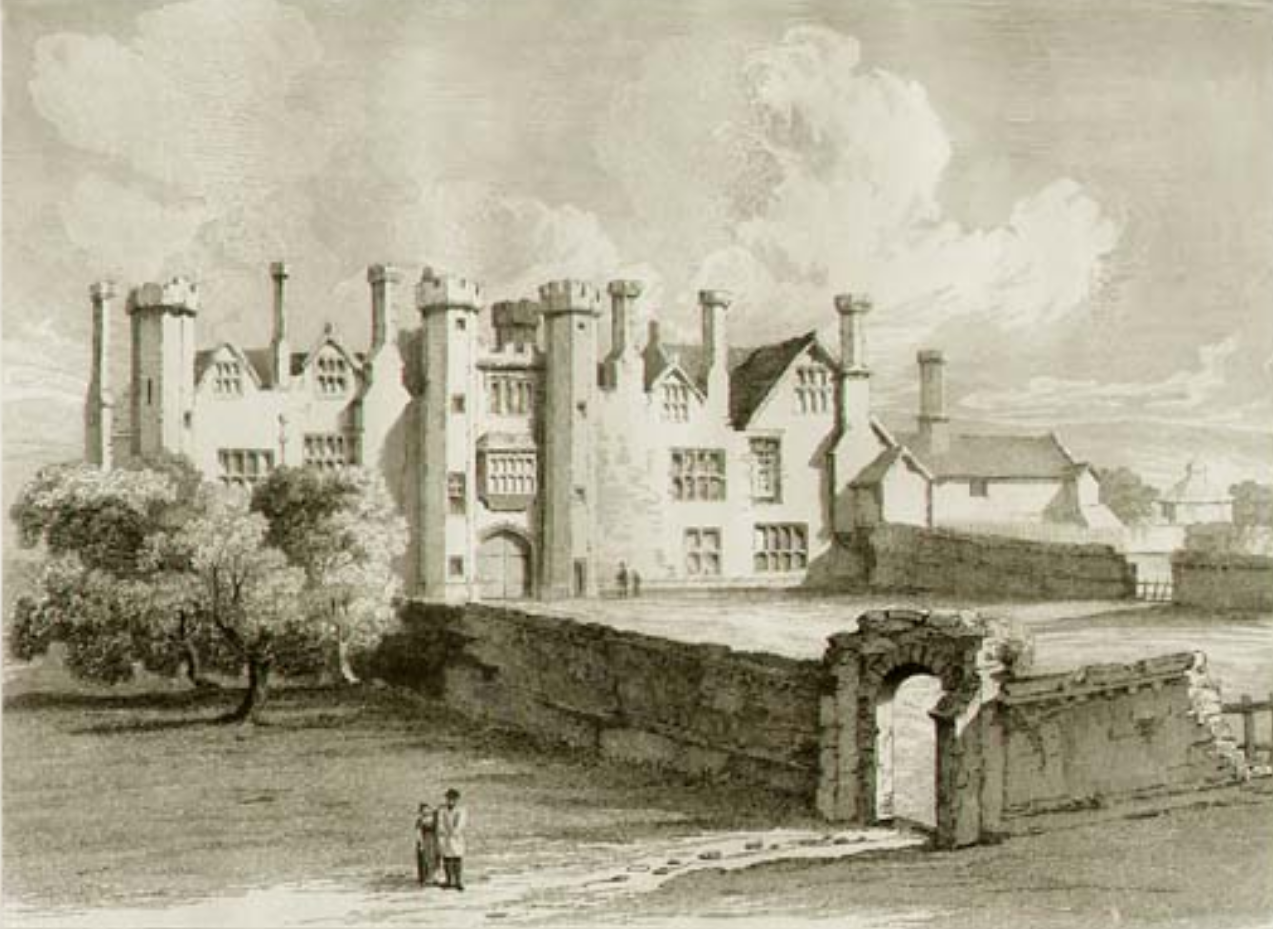
Standon Lordship, Hertfordshire

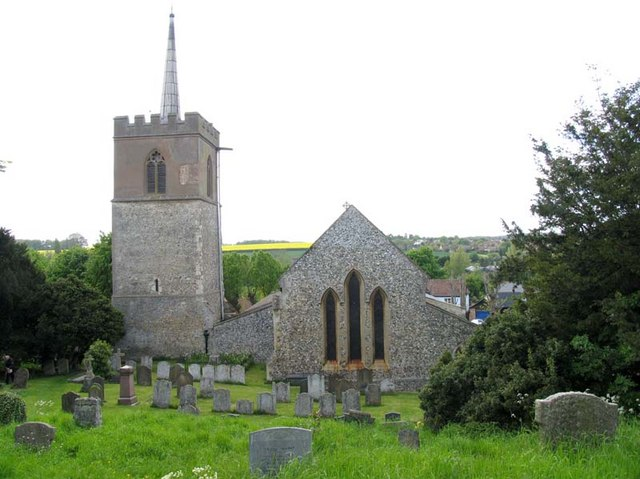
St Mary's Church, Standon, Hertfordshire

Although there are elaborate monuments for his father and grandfather, no monument was erected for him, unless, as Major Sadleir-Stoney suggests, it was one that stands at the east side of the chancel, of which the brass has been taken away.

== Sources ==
- Boyer, Allen D. (2003). Sir Edward Coke and the Elizabethan Age. Stanford: Stanford University Press. p. 293. ISBN 9780804748094.
- Burke, Victoria E. (2004). "Sadleir [née Coke], Anne (1585–1671/2), literary patron". Oxford Dictionary of National Biography (online ed.). Oxford University Press. doi:10.1093/ref:odnb/68095. (Subscription, Wikipedia Library access or UK public library membership required.)
- Burton, Edwin (1906). "Standon Lordship, Hertfordshire". Transactions of the East Hertfordshire Archaeological Society. 3 (2): 140–148.
- Cassidy, Irene (1981). "Sadler, Thomas (c.1536-1607), of Standon, Herts.". In Hasler, P. W. (ed.). The History of Parliament: the House of Commons 1558-1603 – via History of Parliament Online.
- Chauncy, Henry (1826). The Historical Antiquities of Hertfordshire. Vol. 1. Bishops Stortford: J. M. Mullinger. pp. 429–430.
- Clutterbuck, Robert (1827). The History and Antiquities of the County of Hertford: Compiled from the Best Printed Authorities and Original Records Preserved in Public Repositories and Private Collections; Embellished with Views of the Most Curious Monuments of Antiquity and Illustrated with a Map of the County. Vol. 3. London: Nichols and Bentley. pp. 28–29, 226–228. OCLC 62053799.
- Cokayne, G. E. (1910). Gibbs, Vicary (ed.). The Complete Peerage of England, Scotland, Ireland, Great Britain and the United Kingdom. Vol. 1. London: St Catherine Press. pp. 285–286.
- Harvey, William; Cooke, Robert; Owen, George (1884). Blaydes, Frederic Augustus (ed.). The Visitations of Bedfordshire, Annis Domini 1566, 1582, and 1634, Made by William Harvey Robert Cooke and George Owen As Deputy for Richard St. George: Together with Additional Pedigrees Chiefly from Harleian Ms. 1531; and an Appendix Containing a List of Pedigrees Entered at the Visitation of 1669; Also Lists of Bedfordshire Knights and Gentry Taken from Lasdowne Ms. 887. The Publications of the Harleian Society. Vol. 29. London: Harleian Society. p. 136. OCLC 866625909.
- Heal, Ambrose (May 1943). "A Great Country House in 1623". The Burlington Magazine for Connoisseurs. 82 (482): 108–116. JSTOR 868565.
- Hunt, Arnold (2004). "The Books, Manuscripts and Literary Patronage of Mrs Anne Sadleir (1585–1670)". In Burke, Victoria E.; Gibson, Jonathan (eds.). Early Modern Women's Manuscript Writing: Selected Papers from the Trinity/Trent Colloquium. Routledge. pp. 242–279. ISBN 9781138257481.
- James, Charles Warburton (1929). Chief Justice Coke: His Family and Descendants at Holkham. London: Country Life Ltd. pp. 50–68. OCLC 921453.
- Loomie, A. J. (January 2008) [2004]. "Aston, Walter, Baron Aston of Forfar (1584–1639)". Oxford Dictionary of National Biography (online ed.). Oxford University Press. doi:10.1093/ref:odnb/828. (Subscription, Wikipedia Library access or UK public library membership required.)
- Morris, John, ed. (1872). The Troubles of Our Catholic Forefathers, Related by Themselves. 1st series. Vol. 1. London: Burns and Oates. pp. 400–401.
- Sadleir, Thomas Ulick (1905). "Sir Ralph Sadleir". Transactions of the East Hertfordshire Archaeological Society. 3 (1): 79–99.
- Sadler, Ralph; Scott, Walter (1809). Clifford, Arthur (ed.). The State Papers and Letters of Sir Ralph Sadler Knight Banneret. Edited by Arthur Clifford Esq. in Two Volumes. to Which Is Added a Memoir of the Life of Sir Ralph Sadler with Historical Notes by Walter Scott Esq. Vol. 2. Edinburgh: Archibald Constable and Co.
- Stoney, F. Sadleir (1877). A Memoir of the Life and Times of the Right Honourable Sir Ralph Sadleir. London: Longmans, Green & Co. pp. 248–249. OCLC 3930522.
