= Anne Sadleir =

English literary patron (1585–c.1671)

- Born: Anne Coke; 1 March 1585; Huntingfield, Suffolk
- Died: c. 1671 (aged 85–86); Standon Lordship, Hertfordshire
- Resting place: St. Mary's Church, Standon, Hertfordshire; 51.881111°N 0.027222°E
- Known for: Literary patron
- Spouse: Ralph Sadleir (m. 1601; died 1661)
- Parents: Edward Coke; Bridget Paston

Anne Sadleir (née Coke; 1 March 1585 – c. 1671) of Standon, Hertfordshire was an English literary patron. She was born in Huntingfield, Suffolk, the eldest daughter of the prominent lawyer, Sir Edward Coke (1552 – 1634) and his first wife, Bridget Paston (d. 1598), daughter of John Paston of Norwich, Norfolk. In a poem about her early life she wrote that she was educated at Elsing, Norfolk.

== Life ==
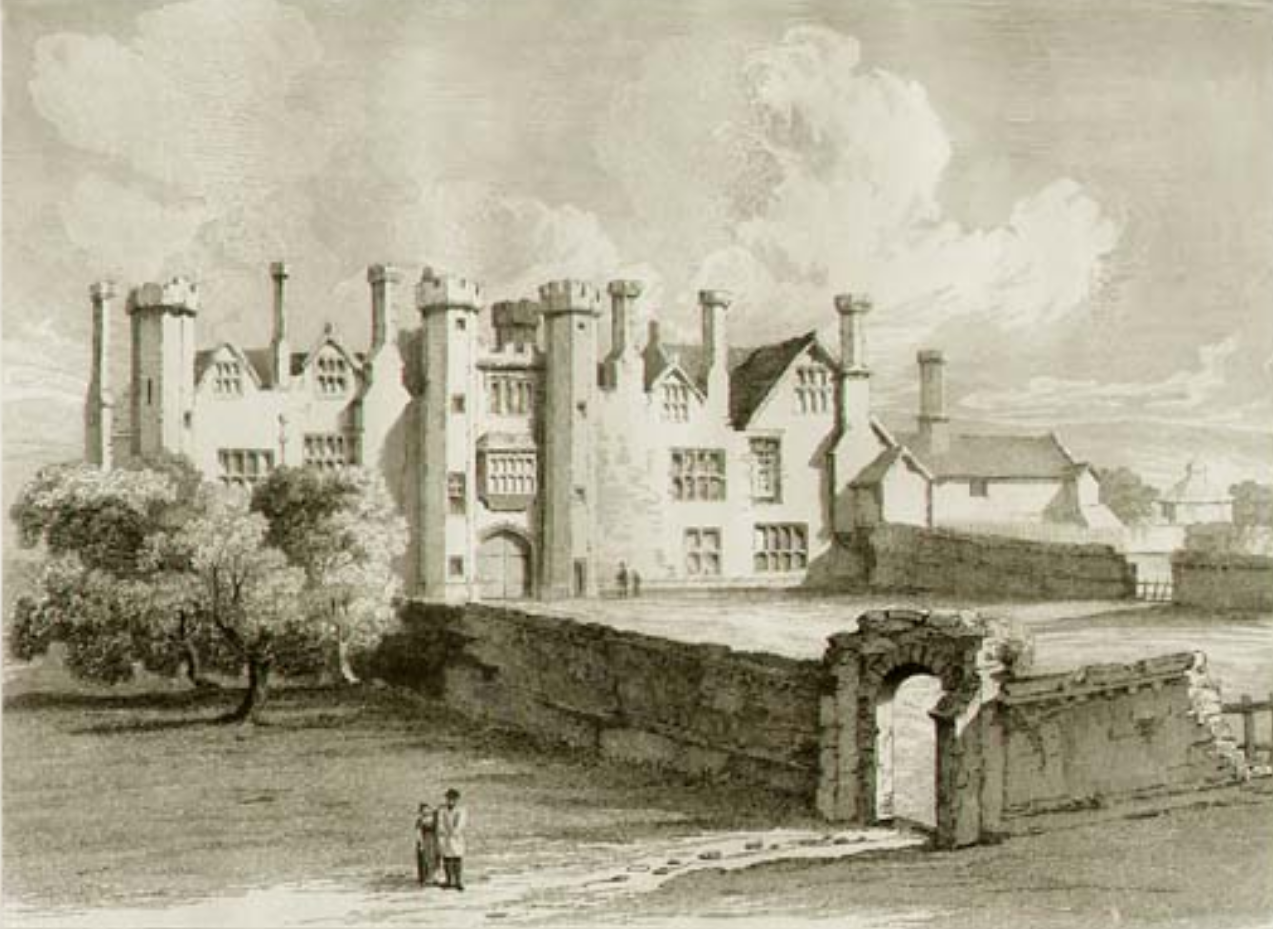
Standon Lordship, Hertfordshire

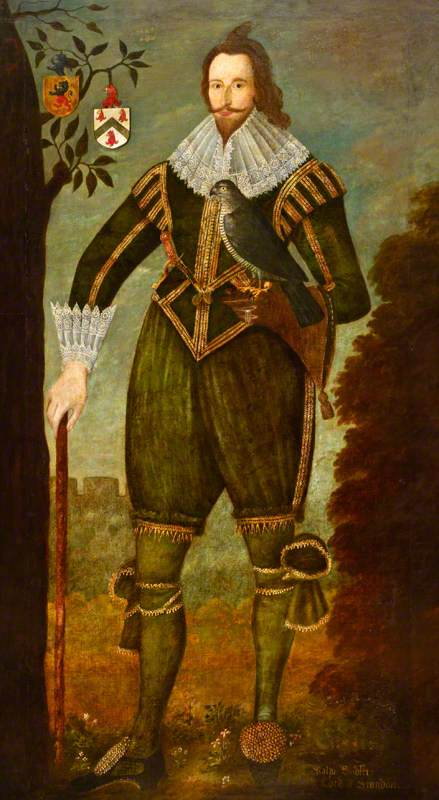
Ralph Sadleir, c. 1615 – 1625 (Sutton House)

On 13 September 1601 "at the age of fifteen" she married Ralph Sadleir (1579 – 1661) of Standon, Hertfordshire, with a dowry of £3,000. The marriage took place at Burghley House in Lincolnshire, where the bride's father, then Elizabeth I's Attorney General, "furnished the feast with all magnificence" and the "plate given by friends to the bride was above £800." Ralph was the eldest son, and heir, of the wealthy landowner, Sir Thomas Sadleir (c. 1536 – 1607), lord of the manor of Standon, and his second wife, Gertrude, daughter of Robert Markham, of Cotham, Nottinghamshire. Sir Henry Chauncy, writing thirty years after his death, says he delighted in hunting and hawking and the pleasures of country life; was famous for his noble table, his great hospitality to his neighbours, and his abundant charity to the poor. Standon Lordship, the grand manor house where the couple lived after their marriage, was built for Ralph's grandfather, Sir Ralph Sadleir (1507–1587).

An autograph poem about her early life appears in the smallest of her commonplace books (R.13.74):

"Hunting-field gave me Birth
Ellsing Education
Standon brought Affliction
Which made Heaven my Meditation"

These lines are thought by some to imply that her childless marriage was not a happy one. Emmerson and McCaffrey speculate about the marriage.

Her mother died in 1598 when she was thirteen and she was particularly close to her father. He visited Anne in 1603 when James VI of Scotland stayed two nights at Standon on his way to London to claim the English throne. He visited her again in 1616 following his dismissal from his post as Chief Justice of the King's Bench. In 1622 he was imprisoned in the Tower of London and Anne was given leave to visit him as she was seen as a good influence on him.

Ralph Sadleir died on 12 February 1661 and was buried in the parish church at Standon. On his death the male line of the Sadleir family came to an end and the Standon estate passed to her "adopted deare son", Walter Aston (1609 – 1678) of Tixall, Staffordshire, son of Walter Aston, 1st Lord Aston of Forfar (1584–1639) and her late husband's sister, Gertrude. Anne continued to live at Standon for the rest of her life. On 16 April 1661 Walter wrote to console his "most deare mother":

"Pray be merry, itt is the best Physick, and I trust in God I shall many and many a time be merry with you at Standon; and if at any time my presence shall be necessary lett me but receave the least notice of itt, and itt shall he obeyed, for I can bee with you in three days. My wife and all myne present desire their duty."

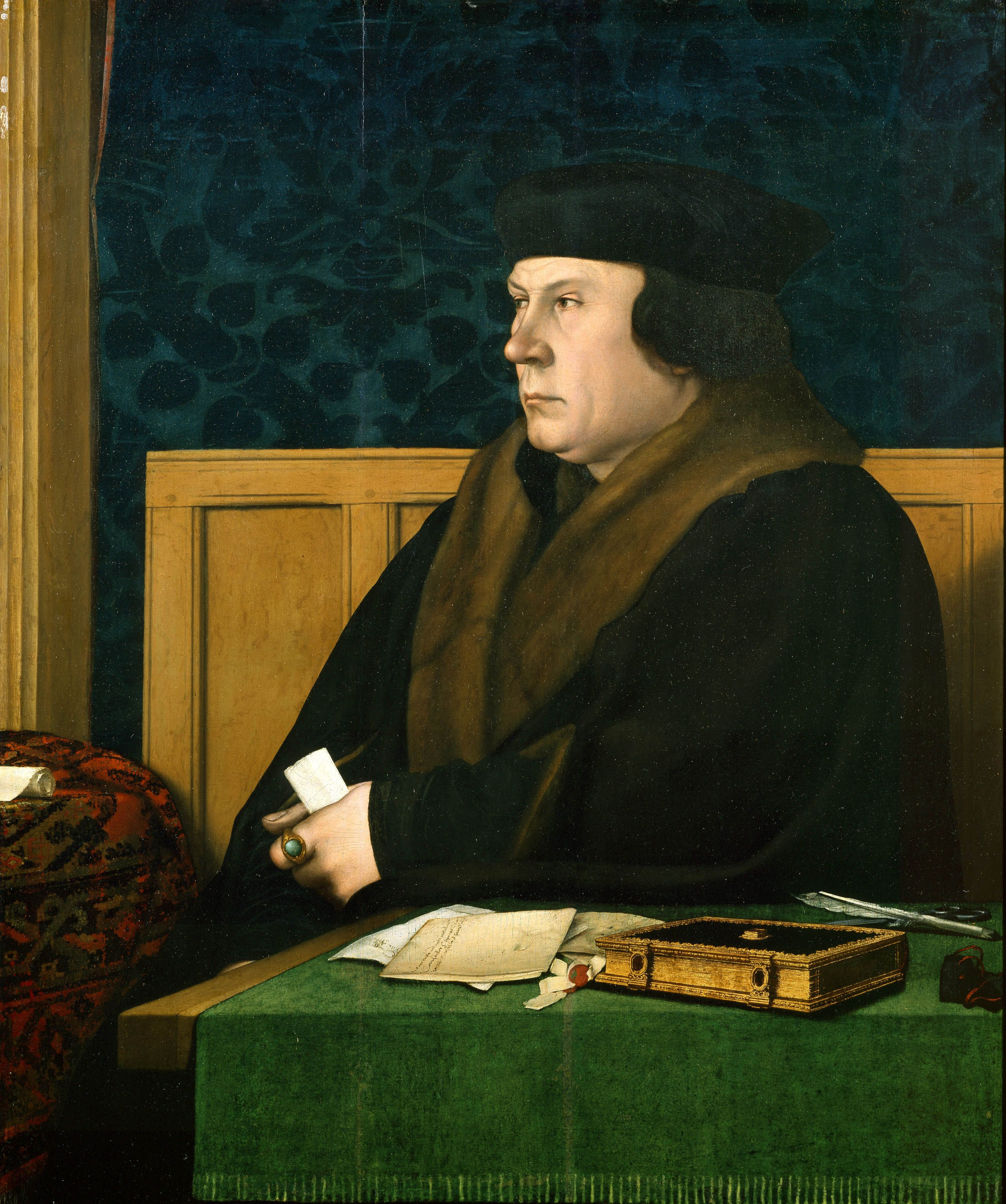
Portrait of Thomas Cromwell, 1532–1533, Hans Holbein the Younger

Sadleir owned a large number of books as well as illuminated manuscripts, coins and curiosities. Several volumes of Sadleir's personal papers are held in the library of Trinity College, Cambridge, including religious and autobiographical meditations (MS R.13.74) and letters from leading Anglican divines and other correspondents (MS R.5.5). She was a royalist and a fervent adherent of the Church of England; she continued to use the prayer book despite its proscription during the English Civil War and engaged in "vigorous epistolary disputes" with her Roman Catholic nephew, Herbert Aston, and the New England puritan divine Roger Williams. She made substantial bequests to the libraries at Trinity College, Cambridge, and the Inner Temple, institutions attended by her father and by other members of her family.

Trinity College Library:

In 1649 and 1669 she presented Trinity with her letters and notebooks, her coins, and several illuminated manuscripts.

- Anne Sadleir, Collection of letters, drafts and other papers, R.5.5
- Anne Sadleir, Commonplace Book, R.5.6
- Anne Sadleir, Commonplace Book, R.13.74
- Trinity Apocalypse, R.16.2
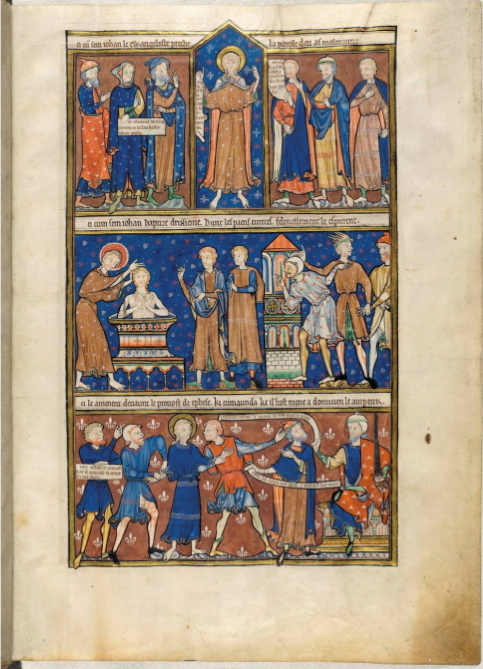
Trinity College Apocalypse, f001r

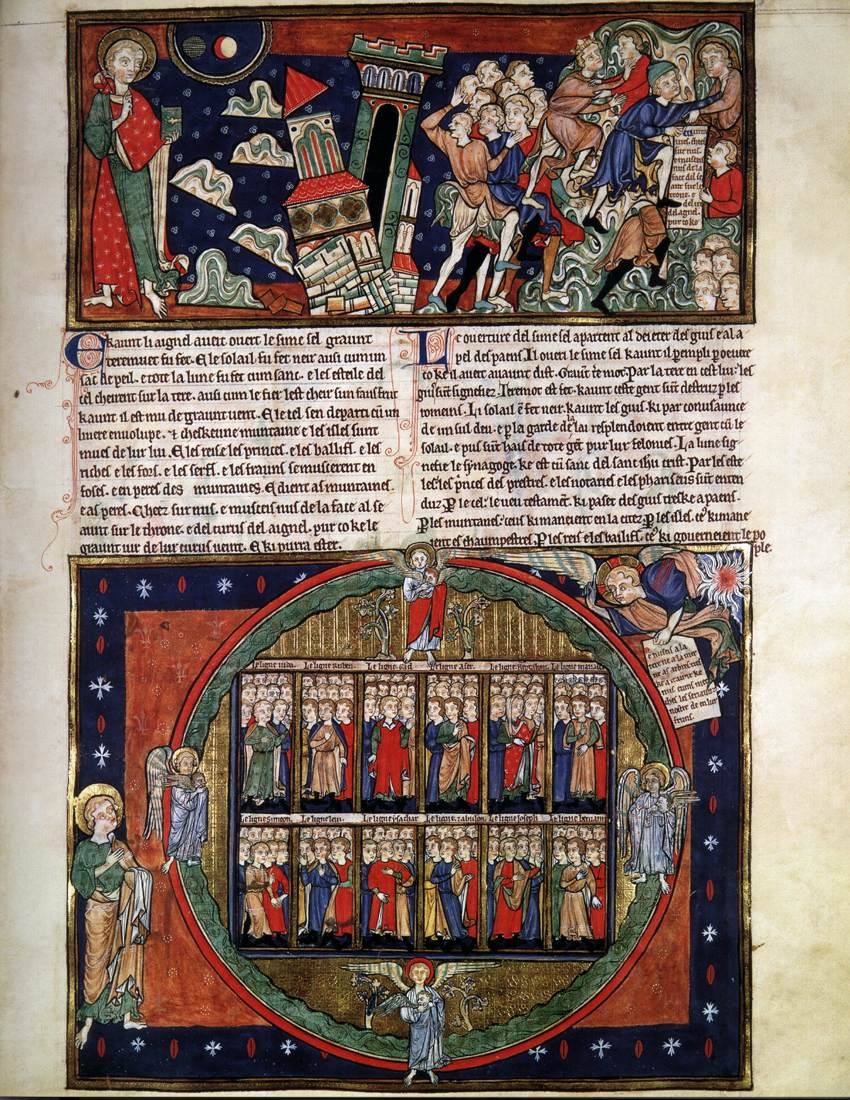
Trinity College Apocalypse, f007r

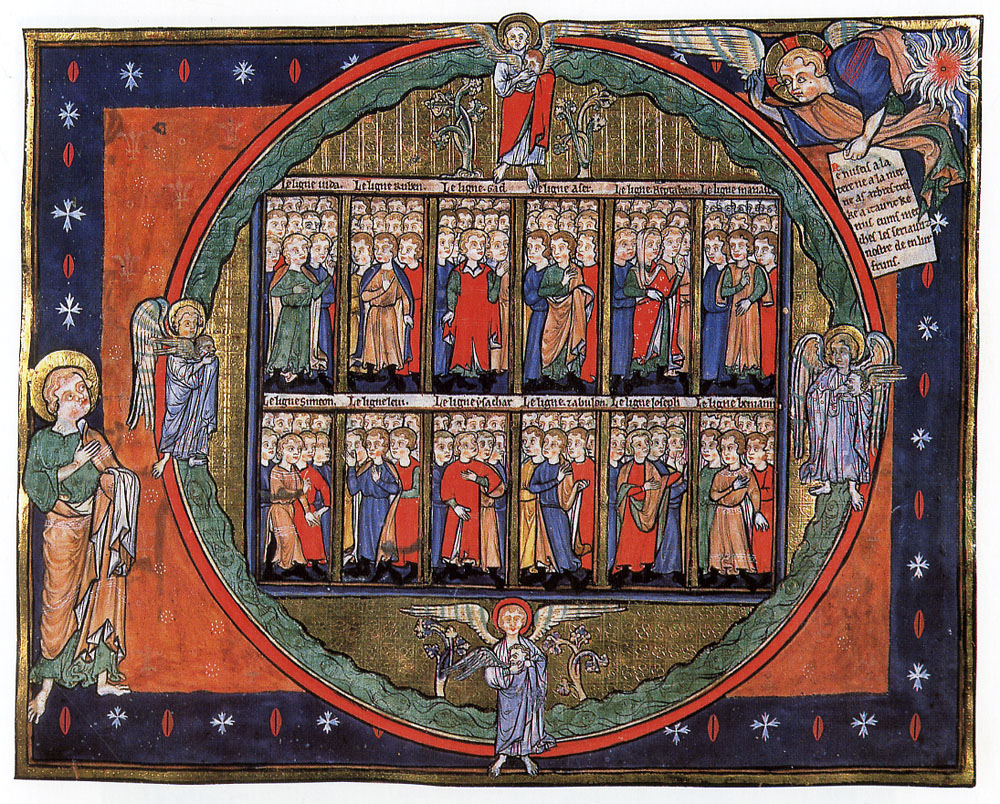
Trinity College Apocalypse, f007r - The Sealing of the Elect

One of Anne's books, a jewelled devotional work, Thomas Cromwell's book of hours (C.30.9), was discovered in the Wren Library at Trinity College, Cambridge in 2023 by researchers from Hever Castle. The prayer book is depicted in Portrait of Thomas Cromwell c. 1532–1533 by Hans Holbein the Younger.

Inner Temple Library:

In 1662 the Inner Temple Library received:

- Two portraits, including Sir Edward Coke, 1552-1634. Attributed to Paul Van Somer.
- Thirteen manuscripts, including a sermon dedicated to Sadleir by Andrew Marvell, father of the poet, Petyt MSS 530/A–F and 531/A–G, and many books from her library.

== Death ==
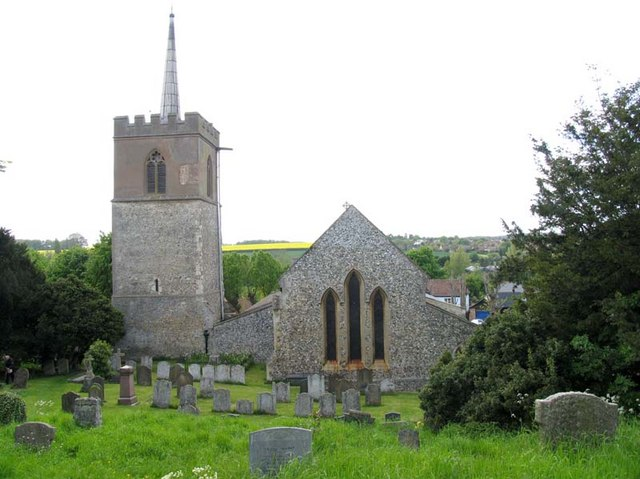
St Mary's church, Standon

Anne Sadleir made her will on 18 May 1670. She died in late 1671 or early 1672 and was buried in St. Mary's Church, Standon. There are magnificent tombs, with effigies, for her late husband's father and grandfather in the chancel, while for his wife there is only "a modest tablet" of black and white marble on the wall of the vestry with the following inscription:

"Here lieth the body of Anne Coke, eldest daughter of Sir Edward Coke, Knight, Lord Chief Justice of the Common Pleas, by his first and best wife Bridget Paston, daughter and heir of John Paston, of Norfolk, Esq. At the age of fifteen she was married, in 1601, to Ralph Sadleir, of Standon, in Hertfordshire. She lived his wife 59 years and odd months. She survived him, and here lies in assured hope of a joyful resurrection".

== Popular culture ==
Anne Sadleir was the inspiration behind M. R. James's ghost story "The Uncommon Prayer Book". M. R. James will have come across her papers, with their many virulent references to Oliver Cromwell, when he catalogued the manuscripts of Trinity College Cambridge.

== Sources ==
- Boyer, Allen D. (2003). Sir Edward Coke and the Elizabethan Age. Stanford: Stanford University Press. p. 293. ISBN 9780804748094.
- Burke, Victoria E. (2004). "Sadleir [née Coke], Anne (1585–1671/2), literary patron". Oxford Dictionary of National Biography (online ed.). Oxford University Press. doi:10.1093/ref:odnb/68095. (Subscription, Wikipedia Library access or UK public library membership required.)
- Burton, Edwin (1906). "Standon Lordship, Hertfordshire". Transactions of the East Hertfordshire Archaeological Society. 3 (2): 140–148.
- Cassidy, Irene (1981). "Sadler, Thomas (c.1536-1607), of Standon, Herts.". In Hasler, P. W. (ed.). The History of Parliament: the House of Commons 1558-1603 – via History of Parliament Online.
- Chauncy, Henry (1826). The Historical Antiquities of Hertfordshire. Vol. 1. Bishops Stortford: J. M. Mullinger. pp. 429–430.
- Clutterbuck, Robert (1827). The History and Antiquities of the County of Hertford: Compiled from the Best Printed Authorities and Original Records Preserved in Public Repositories and Private Collections; Embellished with Views of the Most Curious Monuments of Antiquity and Illustrated with a Map of the County. Vol. 3. London: Nichols and Bentley. pp. 28–29, 226–228. OCLC 62053799.
- Cokayne, G. E. (1910). Gibbs, Vicary (ed.). The Complete Peerage of England, Scotland, Ireland, Great Britain and the United Kingdom. Vol. 1. London: St Catherine Press. pp. 285–286.
- Davies, James Conway (1972). Catalogue of Manuscripts in the Library of the Honourable Society of the Inner Temple. Vol. 1: The Petyt Collection, MSS. 502-533. London: Oxford University Press for the Masters of the Bench of the Inner Temple. ISBN 9780197116333.
- Emmerson, Owen; McCaffrey, Kate (2023). Holbein's Hidden Gem: Rediscovering Thomas Cromwell's Lost Book. Exeter: Jigsaw Design and Publishing for Hever Castle & Gardens. ISBN 9781910759691. OCLC 1382684836.
- Harvey, William; Cooke, Robert; Owen, George (1884). Blaydes, Frederic Augustus (ed.). The Visitations of Bedfordshire, Annis Domini 1566, 1582, and 1634, Made by William Harvey Robert Cooke and George Owen As Deputy for Richard St. George: Together with Additional Pedigrees Chiefly from Harleian Ms. 1531; and an Appendix Containing a List of Pedigrees Entered at the Visitation of 1669; Also Lists of Bedfordshire Knights and Gentry Taken from Lasdowne Ms. 887. The Publications of the Harleian Society. Vol. 29. London: Harleian Society. p. 136. OCLC 866625909.
- Heal, Ambrose (May 1943). "A Great Country House in 1623". The Burlington Magazine for Connoisseurs. 82 (482): 108–116. JSTOR 868565.
- Hunt, Arnold (2016). "The Books, Manuscripts and Literary Patronage of Mrs Anne Sadleir (1585–1670)". In Burke, Victoria E.; Gibson, Jonathan (eds.). Early Modern Women's Manuscript Writing: Selected Papers from the Trinity/Trent Colloquium. Routledge. pp. 205–236. ISBN 9781138257481.
- James, Charles Warburton (1929). Chief Justice Coke: His Family and Descendants at Holkham. London: Country Life Ltd. pp. 50–68. OCLC 921453.
- Loomie, A. J. (January 2008) [2004]. "Aston, Walter, Baron Aston of Forfar (1584–1639)". Oxford Dictionary of National Biography (online ed.). Oxford University Press. doi:10.1093/ref:odnb/828. (Subscription, Wikipedia Library access or UK public library membership required.)
- Morris, John, ed. (1872). The Troubles of Our Catholic Forefathers, Related by Themselves. 1st series. Vol. 1. London: Burns and Oates. pp. 400–401.
- Sadleir, Thomas Ulick (1905). "Sir Ralph Sadleir". Transactions of the East Hertfordshire Archaeological Society. 3 (1): 79–99.
- Stoney, F. Sadleir (1877). A Memoir of the Life and Times of the Right Honourable Sir Ralph Sadleir. London: Longmans, Green & Co. pp. 248–249. OCLC 3930522.
