= Henry Sadler =

16th-century English politician

The Honourable Henry Sadler
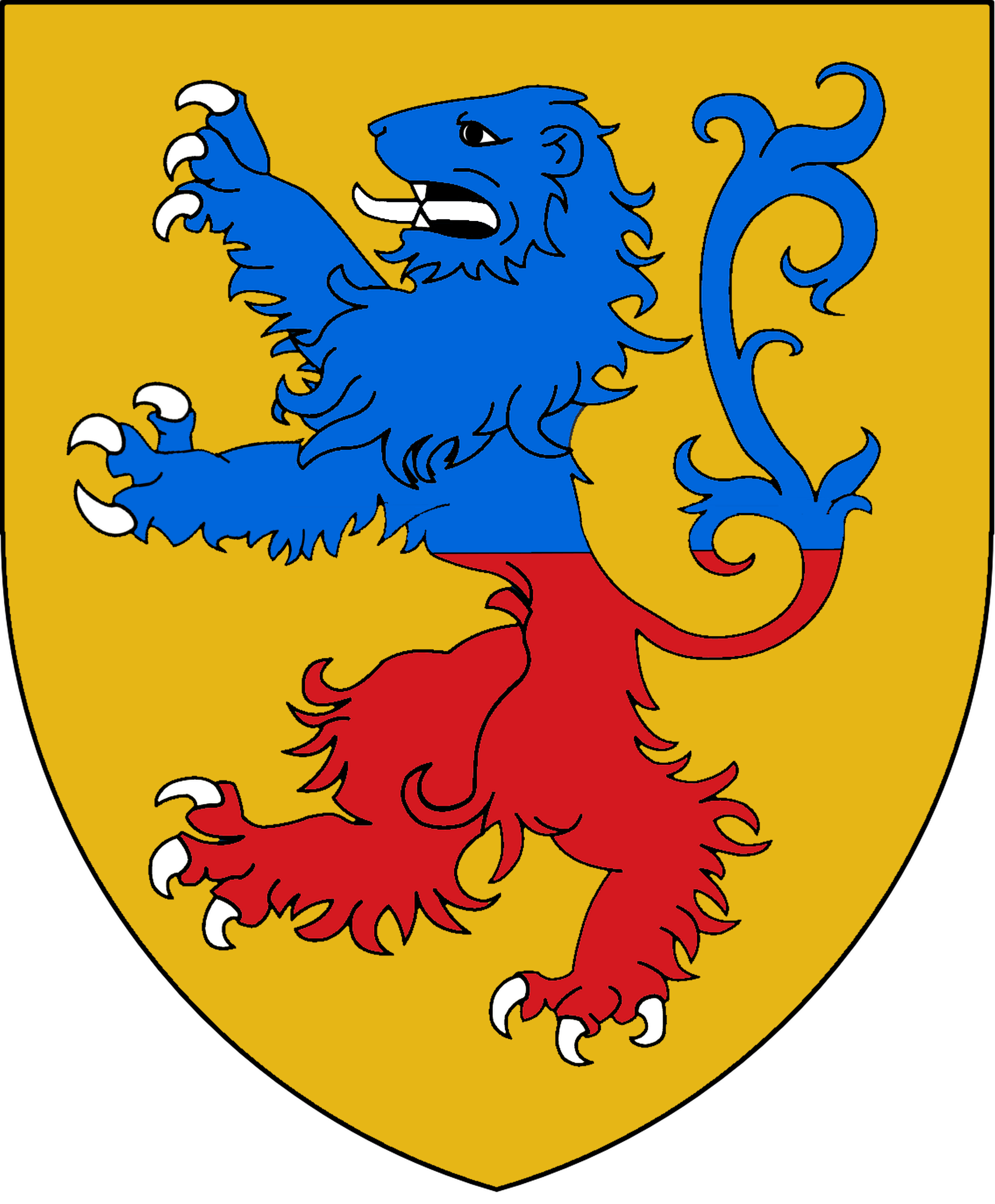
- Arms of Sadler (Sadleir): Or, a lion rampant, parted per fess, azure and gules, armed and langued, argent

Member of Parliament for Lancaster
- In office 1571–1571
- In office 1572–1583
- In office 1584–1585
- In office 1586–1587

Personal details
- Born: c. 1538
- Died: 17 March 1618 (aged 79–80)
- Resting place: Church of St Lawrence, Hungerford; 51.4165°N 1.52084°W
- Spouses: Dorothy Gilbert; Ursula Gill
- Children: with Dorothy: Thomas Sadler; Gertrude Sadler; Dorothy Sadler; Grace Sadler; Ellen Sadler; with Ursula: Francis Sadler; Joan Sadler
- Parents: Sir Ralph Sadler; Ellen Mitchell
- Relatives: Thomas Sadler (brother)
- Education: Gonville and Caius College, Cambridge

Henry Sadler or Sadleir (c. 1538 – 17 March 1618), of Everleigh, Wiltshire and Hungerford, Berkshire, was an English politician who sat in the House of Commons between 1571 and 1587. He was elected MP for Lancaster in 1571, 1572, 1584, 1586 and was Sheriff of Wiltshire in 1595-6.

== Life ==
Sadler was born about 1538, the third son of Sir Ralph Sadler (1507–1587) of Hackney, Middlesex and Standon, Hertfordshire and Ellen Mitchell, daughter of John Mitchell of Much Hadham, Hertfordshire and "widow" of Matthew Barre of Sevenoaks, Kent.

He was a student at Gonville and Caius College, Cambridge in 1558.

He was Steward of Duchy of Lancaster lands in Wiltshire from 1570 to 1618, Clerk of the Hanaper from 1572 to 1604, constable of Leicester Castle in 1576, Justice of the peace in the Court of quarter sessions for Wiltshire in 1592 and Sheriff of Wiltshire in 1595-6.

Sadler entertained the King and Queen at Everleigh on 31 August 1603.

=== Falconry ===
Like his father, Sadler had an interest in falconry.

=== Marriages and family ===
He married, firstly, Dorothy Gilbert, daughter of Edward Gilbert of Everleigh, Wiltshire, by whom he had children, including:

- Thomas Sadler
- Gertrude Sadler
- Dorothy Sadler
- Grace Sadler
- Ellen Sadler

He married, secondly, Ursula Gill, daughter of John Gill of Widial, Hertfordshire, by whom he had children, including:

- Francis Sadler
- Joan Sadler

== Death ==
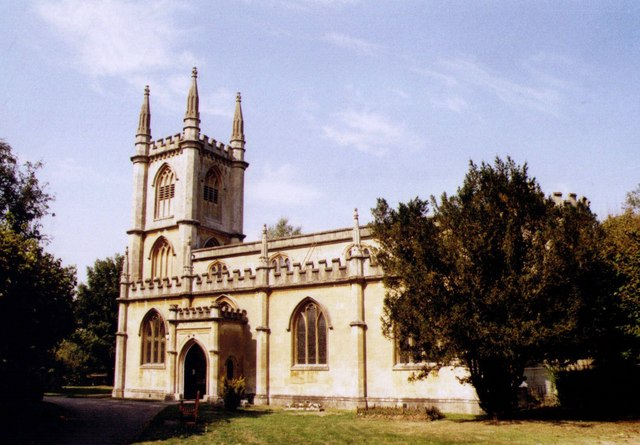
Church of St Lawrence, Hungerford

He died on 17 March 1618, ten days after his eldest son, and was buried in Hungerford church. A life interest in the lands at Everley and Hungerford was bequeathed to his "well-beloved wife" Ursula, the sole executrix, with a reversion to the eldest surviving son of their marriage. His daughter Joan was left a farm and tenement in Middle Everley, three score ewes and their pasture, and £1,000. In a codicil, he arranged the disinheritance of his son Francis if he lived abroad or fell "into the Romish or Popish religion". He was succeeded by Francis Sadler.

== Sources ==
- Aubrey, John; Jackson, John Edward (1862). Wiltshire: The Topographical Collections of John Aubrey, F. R. S., A. D. 1659–70, With Illustrations. Corrected and enlarged by John Edward Jackson. London: Wiltshire Archaeological and Natural History Society.
- Baggs, A. P.; Crittall, Elizabeth; Freeman, Jane; Stevenson, Janet H. (1980). "Parishes: Enford". In Crowley, D. A. (ed.). A History of the County of Wiltshire. Vol. 11: Downton Hundred, Elstub and Everleigh Hundred. London: Victoria County History. pp. 135–142 – via British History Online.
- Cassidy, Irene (1981). "Sadler, Henry (c.1538-1618), of Everley, Wilts and Hungerford, Berks.". In Hasler, P. W. (ed.). The History of Parliament: the House of Commons 1558-1603. Archived from the original on 17 December 2024 – via History of Parliament Online.
- Clutterbuck, Robert (1827). The History and Antiquities of the County of Hertford: Compiled from the Best Printed Authorities and Original Records Preserved in Public Repositories and Private Collections; Embellished with Views of the Most Curious Monuments of Antiquity and Illustrated with a Map of the County. Vol. 3. London: Nichols and Bentley. pp. 28–29, 226–228. OCLC 62053799.
- Coros, D. F. (1982). "Sadler, Ralph (1507–87), of Hackney, Mdx., Standon, Herts. and Lesnes, Kent". In Bindoff, S. T. (ed.). The History of Parliament: the House of Commons 1509–1558. Archived from the original on 26 December 2024 – via History of Parliament Online.
- Harvey, William; Cooke, Robert; Owen, George (1884). Blaydes, Frederic Augustus (ed.). The Visitations of Bedfordshire, Annis Domini 1566, 1582, and 1634, Made by William Harvey Robert Cooke and George Owen As Deputy for Richard St. George: Together with Additional Pedigrees Chiefly from Harleian Ms. 1531; and an Appendix Containing a List of Pedigrees Entered at the Visitation of 1669; Also Lists of Bedfordshire Knights and Gentry Taken from Lasdowne Ms. 887. The Publications of the Harleian Society. Vol. 29. London: Harleian Society. p. 136. OCLC 866625909.
- Nichols, John (1828). The Progresses, Processions, and Magnificent Festivities of King James the First, His Royal Consort, Family, and Court. Vol. 1. London: J. B. Nichols. p. 255.
- Phillips, Gervase (January 2008) [2004]. "Sadler, Sir Ralph (1507–1587)". Oxford Dictionary of National Biography (online ed.). Oxford University Press. doi:10.1093/ref:odnb/24462. (Subscription, Wikipedia Library access or UK public library membership required.)
- Sadler, Ralph; Scott, Walter (1809). Clifford, Arthur (ed.). The State Papers and Letters of Sir Ralph Sadler Knight Banneret. Edited by Arthur Clifford Esq. in Two Volumes. to Which Is Added a Memoir of the Life of Sir Ralph Sadler with Historical Notes by Walter Scott Esq. Vol. 2. Edinburgh: Archibald Constable and Co.
- Sadleir, Thomas Ulick (1905). "Sir Ralph Sadleir". Transactions of the East Hertfordshire Archaeological Society. 3 (1): 79–99.
- Slavin, Arthur Joseph (1965). "Parliament and Henry VIII's Bigamous Principal Secretary". Huntington Library Quarterly. 28 (2): 131–143. doi:10.2307/3816802. JSTOR 3816802.
- Stoney, F. Sadleir (1877). A Memoir of the Life and Times of the Right Honourable Sir Ralph Sadleir. London: Longmans, Green & Co. pp. 247–249. OCLC 3930522.
