= Thomas Sadleir (died 1607) =

English landowner and politician

The Honourable Sir Thomas Sadleir
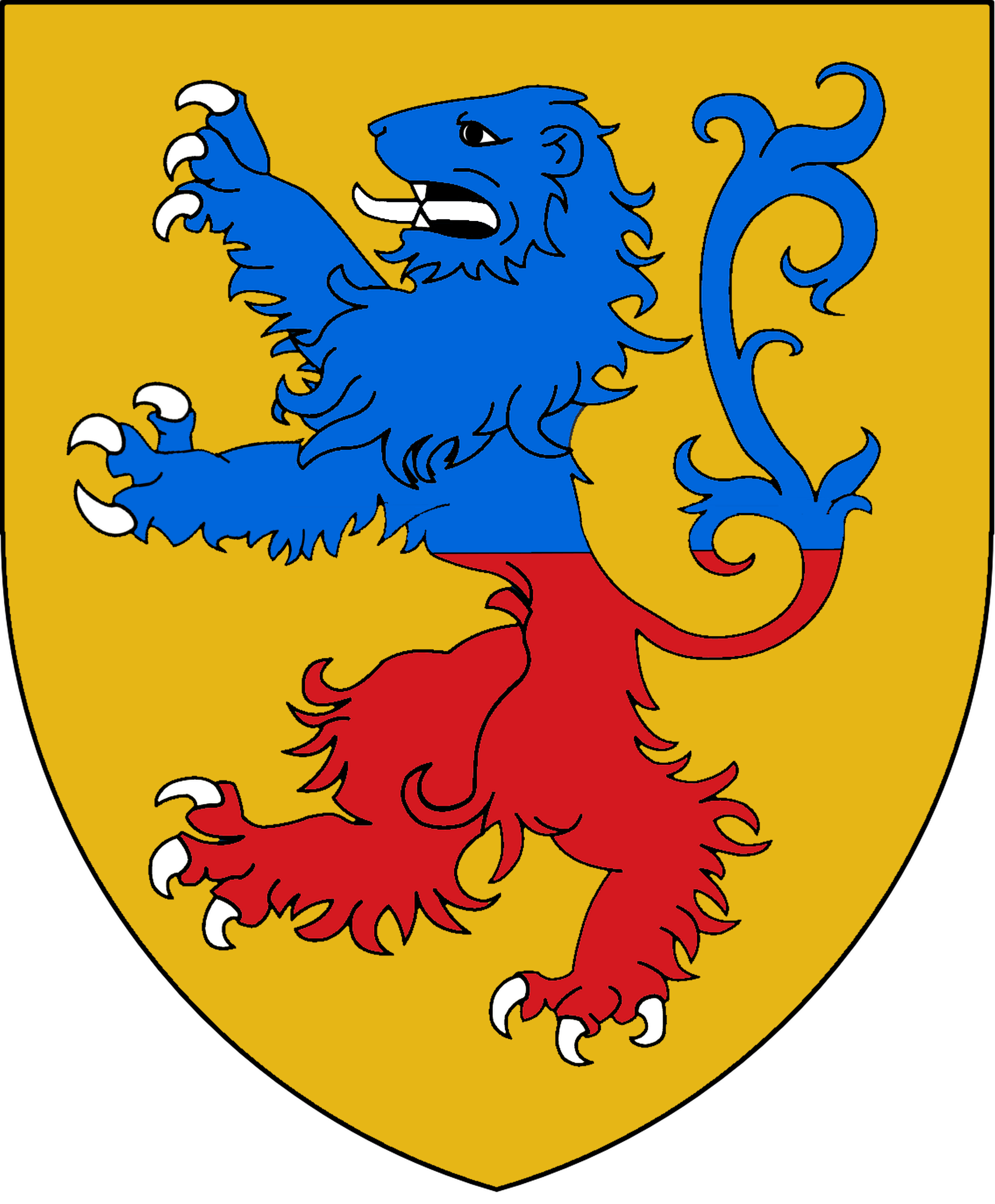
- Arms of Sadler (Sadleir): Or, a lion rampant, parted per fess, azure and gules, armed and langued, argent

Member of Parliament for Lancaster
- In office 1572–1583
- Preceded by: Henry Sadleir
- Succeeded by: Henry Sadleir

Personal details
- Born: c. 1536
- Died: 5 January 1607 (aged 70–71)
- Resting place: St Mary's church, Standon; 51.88143°N 0.02691°E
- Spouses: Ursula Sharington; Gertrude Markham
- Children: with Gertrude: Ralph Sadleir; Gertrude Sadleir
- Parents: Sir Ralph Sadleir; Ellen Mitchell
- Relatives: Henry Sadler (brother)
- Education: Trinity Hall, Cambridge

Sir Thomas Sadleir or Sadler (c. 1536 – 5 January 1607) of Standon, Hertfordshire was an English landowner and politician. He was elected MP for Lancaster in 1572 and was Sheriff of Hertfordshire in 1595. He was knighted by 1600.

== Life ==
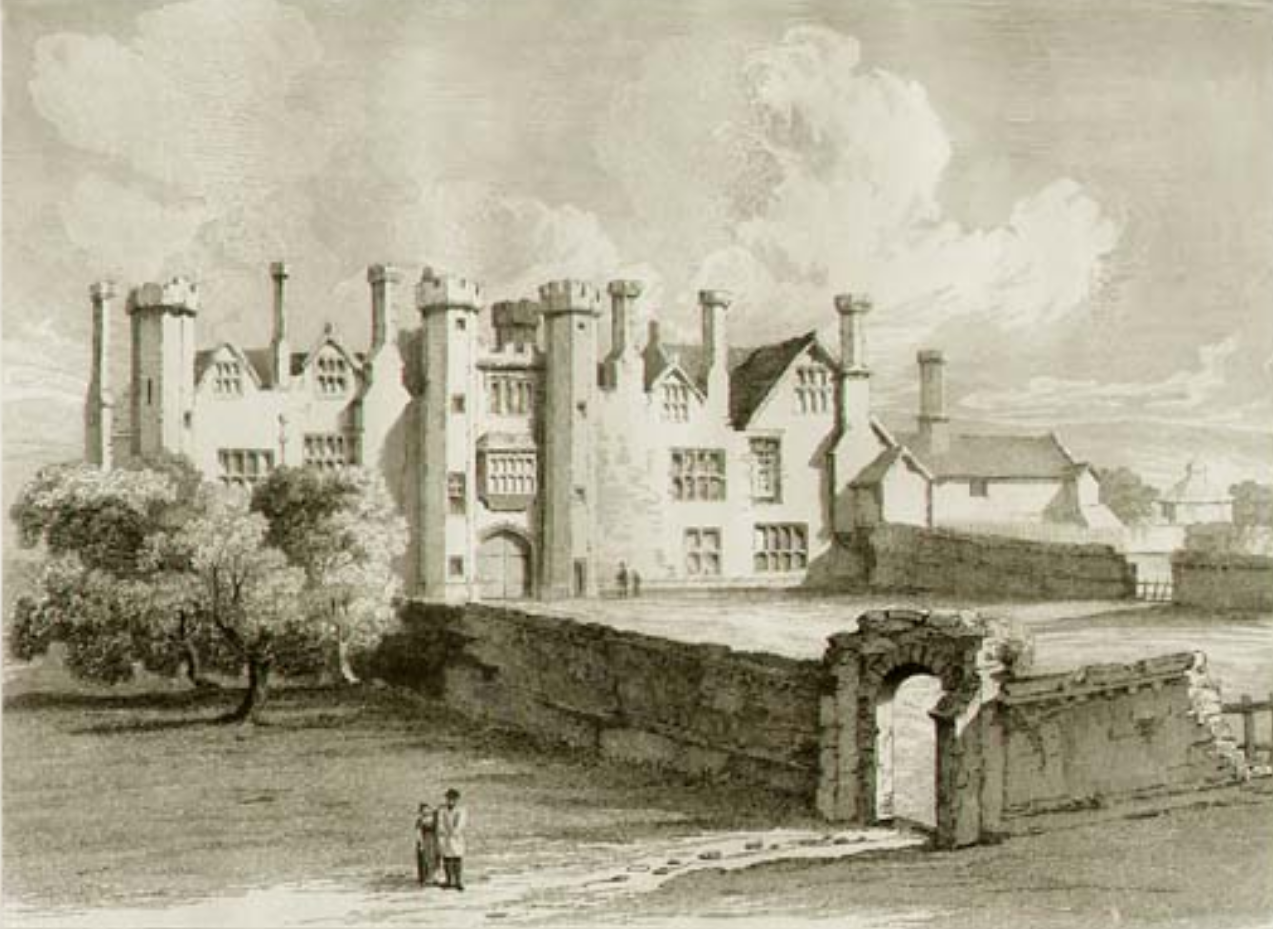
Standon Lordship, Hertfordshire

He was the eldest son, and heir, of Sir Ralph Sadleir (1507–1587) of Hackney and Standon and Ellen Mitchell, daughter of John Mitchell of Much Hadham, Hertfordshire and "widow" of Matthew Barre of Sevenoaks, Kent.

He was a student at Trinity Hall, Cambridge in 1554 and was admitted to the Middle Temple in 1558.

Sadleir was a justice of the peace for Hertfordshire from about 1569; he was elected MP for the seat of Lancaster in 1572, serving until 1583; quarter sessions in 1587; constable of Hertford Castle, steward of Hertford and Hertingfordbury from March to July 1587; sheriff of Hertfordshire from June to November 1588 and from 1595 to 1596.

He has been described as a man "who lived in honourable reputation for his religion, justice, bounty, love of his country, favour of learning and all other virtues, and as he lived, he ended his life Christianly."

=== Marriages and family ===
He married, firstly, Ursula Sharington, daughter of Sir Henry Sharington of Lacock, Wiltshire, with whom he had no children; secondly, Gertrude Markham, daughter of Robert Markham of Cotham, Nottinghamshire, with whom he had a son and a daughter:

- Ralph Sadleir (1579 – 1661), married Anne Coke (1585 – c. 1671), the eldest daughter of Sir Edward Coke (1552 – 1634) and his first wife, Bridget Paston (d. 1598), daughter of John Paston of Norwich, Norfolk.
- Gertrude Sadleir (b. c. 1582-7), married Walter Aston, 1st Lord Aston of Forfar (1584–1639).

In 1603 King James VI of Scotland came through Hertfordshire on his progress towards London to claim the English throne. On 30 April he came to Standon and having been met by the Bishop of London and a company of gentlemen "in coats and chains of gold," proceeded to Standon Lordship, where he stayed for two nights. "At Sir Thomas Sadleir's, his Majestie was Royally entertained, for himselfe and his Kingly Traine; nothing being wanting the best desired, nor that the meanest could demaund." Traces of the King's visit lingered in the house and more half a century later, in "the King's Chamber", there remained "Three peices of flatcapp hangings of the story of the Marriage of the Queene of Scotts."

== Death ==
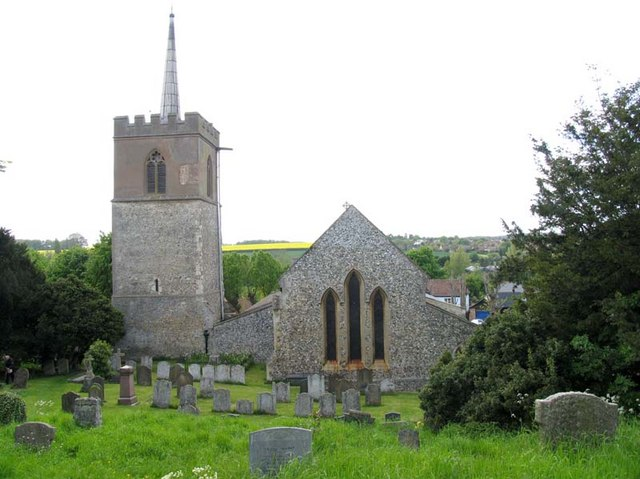
St Mary's church, Standon

Thomas Sadleir died on 5 January 1607 and was buried in the chancel of the parish church at Standon. An elaborate tomb, with recumbent effigies of Sir Thomas and his wife, has a Latin inscription above:

D. O. M.
ET
Memorise Thomæ Sadleiri, Equitis Aurati
Hie situs obdormit Christo, Christoque resurgat
Thomas Sadleirus stemmate Claris eques
Quo micuere simul bonitas, prudentia, candor,
Cum probitate pudor, cum pietate fides.
Heec ilium decorant, bsec sunt monumenta sepulto
Qui Tumulo decus est et fuit ante suis
Attamen hoc posuit monumentum filius illi
Ut constet pietas officiosa patri.

Under this inscription lies a knight in armour, with a lady on his right hand, and two lions at their feet. On the side of the monument, are effigies of his son and daughter on their knees, with an inscription between them:

"Here resteth in assured hope of resurrection in Christ, Sir Thomas Sadleir, of Standon, Knight, son and heir of the Right Honourable Ralph Sadleir, Knight Banneret, Privy Counsellor to three Princes of this land; which Sir Thomas lived in honourable reputation for his learning and all other virtues; and as he lived, he ended his life most Christianly, leaving Ralph and Gertrude his children, by his wife Gertude, daughter of Robert Markham of Cottham in the county of Nottingham, Esq. to whose memory Ralph his sorrowful son in dutiful affection erected this monument, as his last duty. He departed this world the 5th day of January, MDCVI."

He was succeeded by his only son, Ralph.

== Sources ==
- Boyer, Allen D. (2003). Sir Edward Coke and the Elizabethan Age. Stanford: Stanford University Press. p. 293. ISBN 9780804748094.
- Burke, Victoria E. (2004). "Sadleir [née Coke], Anne (1585–1671/2), literary patron". Oxford Dictionary of National Biography (online ed.). Oxford University Press. doi:10.1093/ref:odnb/68095. (Subscription, Wikipedia Library access or UK public library membership required.)
- Burton, Edwin (1906). "Standon Lordship, Hertfordshire". Transactions of the East Hertfordshire Archaeological Society. 3 (2): 140–148.
- Cassidy, Irene (1981). "Sadler, Thomas (c.1536-1607), of Standon, Herts.". In Hasler, P. W. (ed.). The History of Parliament: the House of Commons 1558-1603 – via History of Parliament Online.
- Chauncy, Henry (1826). The Historical Antiquities of Hertfordshire. Vol. 1. Bishops Stortford: J. M. Mullinger. pp. 429–430.
- Clutterbuck, Robert (1827). The History and Antiquities of the County of Hertford: Compiled from the Best Printed Authorities and Original Records Preserved in Public Repositories and Private Collections; Embellished with Views of the Most Curious Monuments of Antiquity and Illustrated with a Map of the County. Vol. 3. London: Nichols and Bentley. pp. 28–29, 226–228. OCLC 62053799.
- Cokayne, G. E. (1910). Gibbs, Vicary (ed.). The Complete Peerage of England, Scotland, Ireland, Great Britain and the United Kingdom. Vol. 1. London: St Catherine Press. pp. 285–286.
- Coros, D. F. (1982). "Sadler, Ralph (1507–87), of Hackney, Mdx., Standon, Herts. and Lesnes, Kent". In Bindoff, S. T. (ed.). The History of Parliament: the House of Commons 1509–1558 – via The History of Parliament Online.
- Dasent, John Roche, ed. (1905). Acts of the Privy Council of England. Vol. 30: 1599–1600. London: HMSO – via British History Online.
- Harvey, William; Cooke, Robert; Owen, George (1884). Blaydes, Frederic Augustus (ed.). The Visitations of Bedfordshire, Annis Domini 1566, 1582, and 1634, Made by William Harvey Robert Cooke and George Owen As Deputy for Richard St. George: Together with Additional Pedigrees Chiefly from Harleian Ms. 1531; and an Appendix Containing a List of Pedigrees Entered at the Visitation of 1669; Also Lists of Bedfordshire Knights and Gentry Taken from Lasdowne Ms. 887. The Publications of the Harleian Society. Vol. 29. London: Harleian Society. p. 136. OCLC 866625909.
- Heal, Ambrose (May 1943). "A Great Country House in 1623". The Burlington Magazine for Connoisseurs. 82 (482): 108–116. JSTOR 868565.
- James, Charles Warburton (1929). Chief Justice Coke: His Family and Descendants at Holkham. London: Country Life Ltd. pp. 50–68. OCLC 921453.
- Loomie, A. J. (January 2008) [2004]. "Aston, Walter, Baron Aston of Forfar (1584–1639)". Oxford Dictionary of National Biography (online ed.). Oxford University Press. doi:10.1093/ref:odnb/828. (Subscription, Wikipedia Library access or UK public library membership required.)
- Nichols, John (1969) [1st pub. J. Nichols:1823]. The Progresses and Public Processions of Queen Elizabeth: Among Which are Interspersed other Solemnities, Public Expenditures, and Remarkable Events During the Reign of that Illustrious Princess: Collected from Original Manuscripts, Scarce Pamphlets, Corporation Records, Parochial Registers, etc., etc.: Illustrated, with Historical Notes. Burt Franklin: Research and source works series, no. 117. Vol. 2 (New ed.). New York: AMS Press. p. 106.
- Nichols, John (1828). The Progresses, Processions, and Magnificent Festivities of King James the First, His Royal Consort, Family, and Court. Vol. 1. London: J. B. Nichols. p. 106.
- Page, William, ed. (1912). "Parishes: Standon". A History of the County of Hertford. Victoria History of the Counties of England. Vol. 3. London: Constable and Company. p. 354. OCLC 729492806.
- Phillips, Gervase (January 2008) [2004]. "Sadler, Sir Ralph (1507–1587)". Oxford Dictionary of National Biography (online ed.). Oxford University Press. doi:10.1093/ref:odnb/24462. (Subscription, Wikipedia Library access or UK public library membership required.)
- Sadleir, Thomas Ulick (1905). "Sir Ralph Sadleir". Transactions of the East Hertfordshire Archaeological Society. 3 (1): 79–99.
- Sadler, Ralph; Scott, Walter (1809). Clifford, Arthur (ed.). The State Papers and Letters of Sir Ralph Sadler Knight Banneret. Edited by Arthur Clifford Esq. in Two Volumes. to Which Is Added a Memoir of the Life of Sir Ralph Sadler with Historical Notes by Walter Scott Esq. Vol. 2. Edinburgh: Archibald Constable and Co.
- Slavin, Arthur Joseph (1965). "Parliament and Henry VIII's Bigamous Principal Secretary". Huntington Library Quarterly. 28 (2): 131–143. doi:10.2307/3816802. JSTOR 3816802.
- Stoney, F. Sadleir (1877). A Memoir of the Life and Times of the Right Honourable Sir Ralph Sadleir. London: Longmans, Green & Co. pp. 247–249. OCLC 3930522.
