= Edward Aston =

Edward Aston may refer to:

- Sir Edward Aston (died 1568), Sheriff of Staffordshire in 1528, 1534, 1540, and 1556
- Sir Edward Aston (died 1598), Sheriff of Staffordshire in 1590
