= Constance Fowler =

English manuscript author and anthologist

Constance Fowler (née Aston; c. 1621 – 1664) was an English manuscript author and anthologist. She was the youngest child of Walter Aston, 1st Lord Aston of Forfar and Gertrude Sadleir, who were a Catholic family. Her home was The Priory at St Thomas, near the family home of Tixall Hall in Staffordshire.

== Studied ==
Her Verse Miscellany of Constance Aston Fowler is studied as an example of "how manuscript texts were produced, disseminated, and preserved in provincial areas." "Constance Aston Fowler built up her own private anthology, mingling the poems of her family with ones by Ben Jonson, Henry King, and John Donne. Her father, her brother Herbert, sister-in-law Katherine Thimelby, sister Gertrude and their friend Lady Dorothy Shirley contributed. Four of the poems in the anthology also appear in Tixall Poetry and the manuscript, HM 904. She began the anthology in the 1630s and made the last entry in 1658. The manuscript now resides at the Huntington Library in San Marino, California (number HM 904).

Constance married Walter Fowler in about 1634–1635 and had 12 children; Walter, Edward, William, Bryan, Thomas, Francis, Constance, Dorothy, Gertrude, Constance, Mary, and Magdalen. Edward, Bryan, Francis and Constance all died young. Constance died on March 29, 1664, and is buried at Baswich, Staffordshire.

== Primary sources ==
- Fowler, Constance Aston (2000). The Verse Miscellany of Constance Aston Fowler: A Diplomatic Edition. Tempe, Ariz: Arizona Center for Medieval and Renaissance Studies in conjunction with Renaissance English Text Society. p. 206. ISBN 0-86698-252-3.
- Clifford, Arthur (1813). Tixall poetry with notes and illustrations. Edinburgh: Printed by James Ballantyne.

== Secondary sources ==
- Burke, Victoria Elizabeth (1996). Women and Seventeenth-Century Manuscript Culture: Miscellanies, Commonplace Books, and Song Books Compiled by English and Scottish Women, 1600-1660 (PhD thesis). University of Oxford.
- Burke, Victoria Elizabeth (1997). "Women and Early Seventeenth-Century Manuscript Culture: Four Miscellanies". The Seventeenth Century. 12 (2): 135–150. doi:10.1080/0268117X.1997.10555427. ISSN 0268-117X.
- La Belle, Jenijoy (1980). "Huntington Aston Manuscript: First-Line index of the MS". The Book Collector. 29: 549–67.
- LaBelle, Jenijoy (1980). "A True Love's Knot: The Letters of Constance Fowler and the Poems of Herbert Aston". Journal of English and Germanic Philology. 79: 13–31.
