= Edward Aston (died 1598) =

Sir Edward Aston (died 1598) of Tixall, Staffordshire was Sheriff of Staffordshire. (Note: In Mr. Levet's in house at Lichfield in 1817, there was a portrait of Sir Edward Aston, inscribed "Sir Edward Aston, knight banneret, Anno Domini 1573, ætatis suæ 22." He holds in one hand a medallion suspended to a gold chain, and bearing the figure of a woman, probably the picture of Queen Elizabeth.)

== Biography ==
Edward was the eldest son of Sir Walter Aston and his second wife Elizabeth, daughter of James Leveson of Lilleshall, Shropshire.

Sir Edward was a wealthy man: he had estates in the counties of Staffordshire, Derbyshire and Leicestershire, which produced an annual income of £10,000. In the year 1587, Sir Edward Aston was the head of the commission appointed by Queen Elizabeth I, to examine the letters and seal up the papers and effects of Mary Queen of Scots, who was then a prisoner at Chartley Castle. It was at this time that the Babington Plot for carrying off the Queen of Scots, was discovered. Anthony Babington, the ringleader, though not the originator of the Plot, had intended to surprise her guards and attendants, and to carry her off while she was taking the exercise of riding in the fields between Chartley and Stafford.

In 1590, Sir Edward Aston was appointed Sheriff of Staffordshire, an office of honour, and trust, which every one of his ancestors had discharged from the time of King Edward III.

== Family ==
Sir Edward married twice: firstly Mary, third daughter of Sir John Spencer of Althorp and Katherine Kitson, who died childless, and secondly Anne, only daughter of Sir Thomas Lucy, of Charlecote, Warwickshire and Joyce Acton. He and Anne had five daughters and three sons:

- Walter, his heir, who would become 1st Lord Aston,
- Edward, who married Anne, only daughter of Leigh Sadler, of Temple Dinsley, Hertfordshire, grandson of Sir Ralph Sadler, of Standon, Hertfordshire, the able ambassador to Scotland. Anne was a cousin of Gertrude Sadler, Walter Aston's second wife.
- Thomas, who became a barrister, of the Middle Temple, London, and died unmarried.
- Joyce, who married Sir Martin Colepeper, of Deane, Oxfordshire, son of Martin Colepeper, Warden of New College, Oxford and Lettice Clarke.
- Elizabeth, who married John Sambach, of Broadway, Worcestershire: she was the mother of Sir William Sambach, Solicitor General for Ireland.
- Anne, who married Ambrose Elton (1578-1659), of The Hazel, Ledbury, Herefordshire, Sheriff of Herefordshire in 1618: they had three sons and fourteen daughters
- Jane, who married Thomas Elton, M.P.: they were the parents of the military writer Richard Elton
