= Ralph Sadler =

English statesman (1507–1587)

The Right Honourable Sir Ralph Sadler Knight banneret, PC
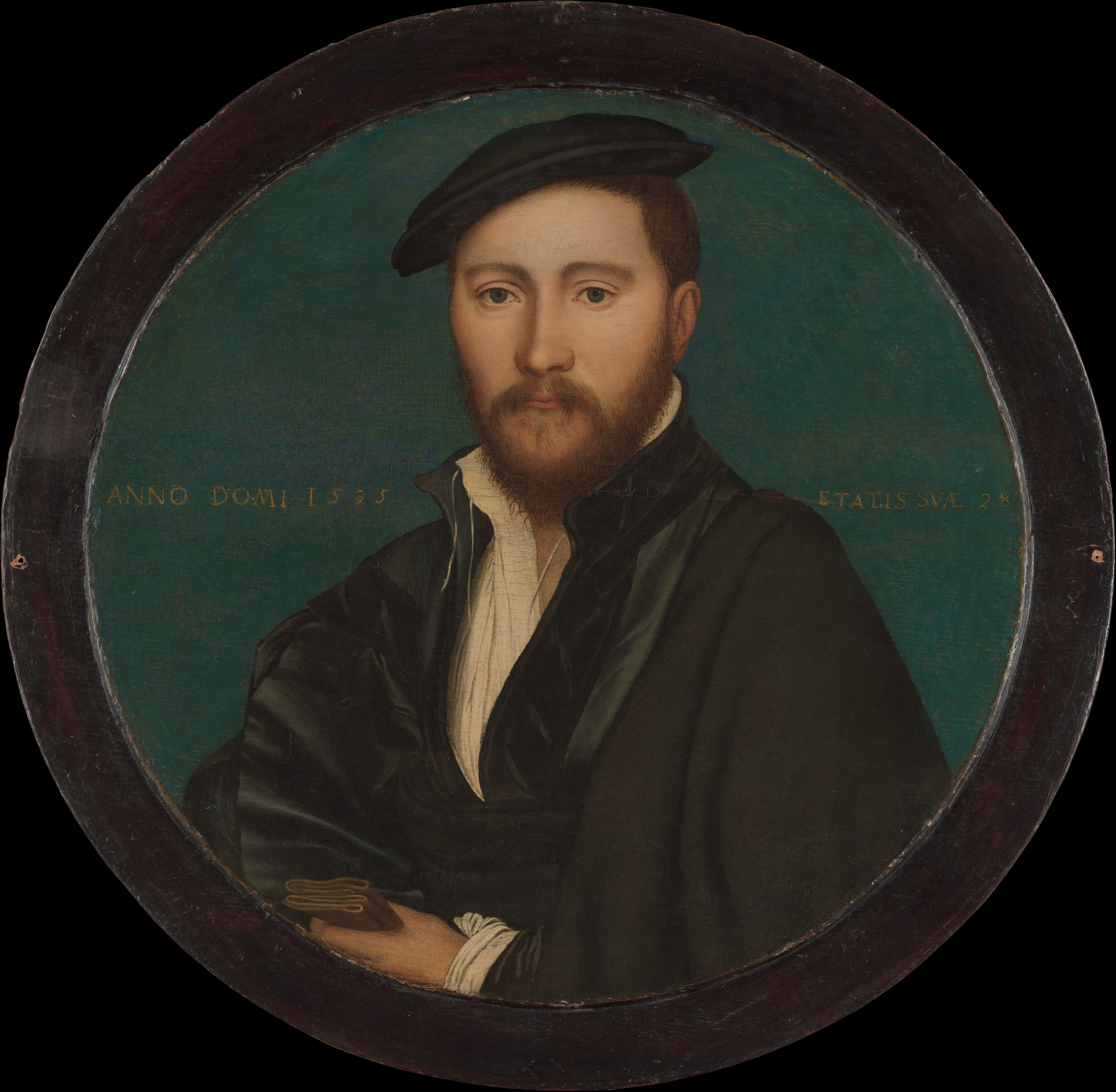
- Portrait of a Man (Sir Ralph Sadler?), 1535, Workshop of Hans Holbein the Younger

Secretary of State
- In office April 1540 – 23 April 1543
- Monarch: Henry VIII
- Preceded by: Thomas Cromwell
- Succeeded by: William Paget

Chancellor of the Duchy of Lancaster
- In office 16 May 1568 – 15 June 1587
- Monarch: Elizabeth I
- Preceded by: Sir Ambrose Cave
- Succeeded by: Sir Francis Walsingham

Personal details
- Born: Ralph Sadler; 1507 Hackney, Middlesex
- Died: 30 March 1587 (aged 79–80) Standon, Hertfordshire
- Resting place: St Mary's Church, Standon, Hertfordshire; 51.881111°N 0.027222°E
- Spouse: Ellen Mitchell (m. 1534; died 1569)
- Children: Sir Thomas Sadler; Edward Sadler; Henry Sadler; Anne Sadler; Mary Sadler; Jane Sadler; Dorothy Sadler; Richard Sadler
- Parent: Henry Sadler

Sir Ralph Sadler or Sadleir (1507 – 30 March 1587) was an English statesman, who served Henry VIII as Privy Councillor, Secretary of State and ambassador to Scotland. Sadler went on to serve Edward VI. Having signed the device settling the crown on Jane Grey in 1553, he was obliged to retire to his estates during the reign of Mary I. Sadler was restored to royal favour during the reign of Elizabeth I, serving as a Privy Councillor and once again participating in Anglo-Scottish diplomacy. He was appointed Chancellor of the Duchy of Lancaster in May 1568.

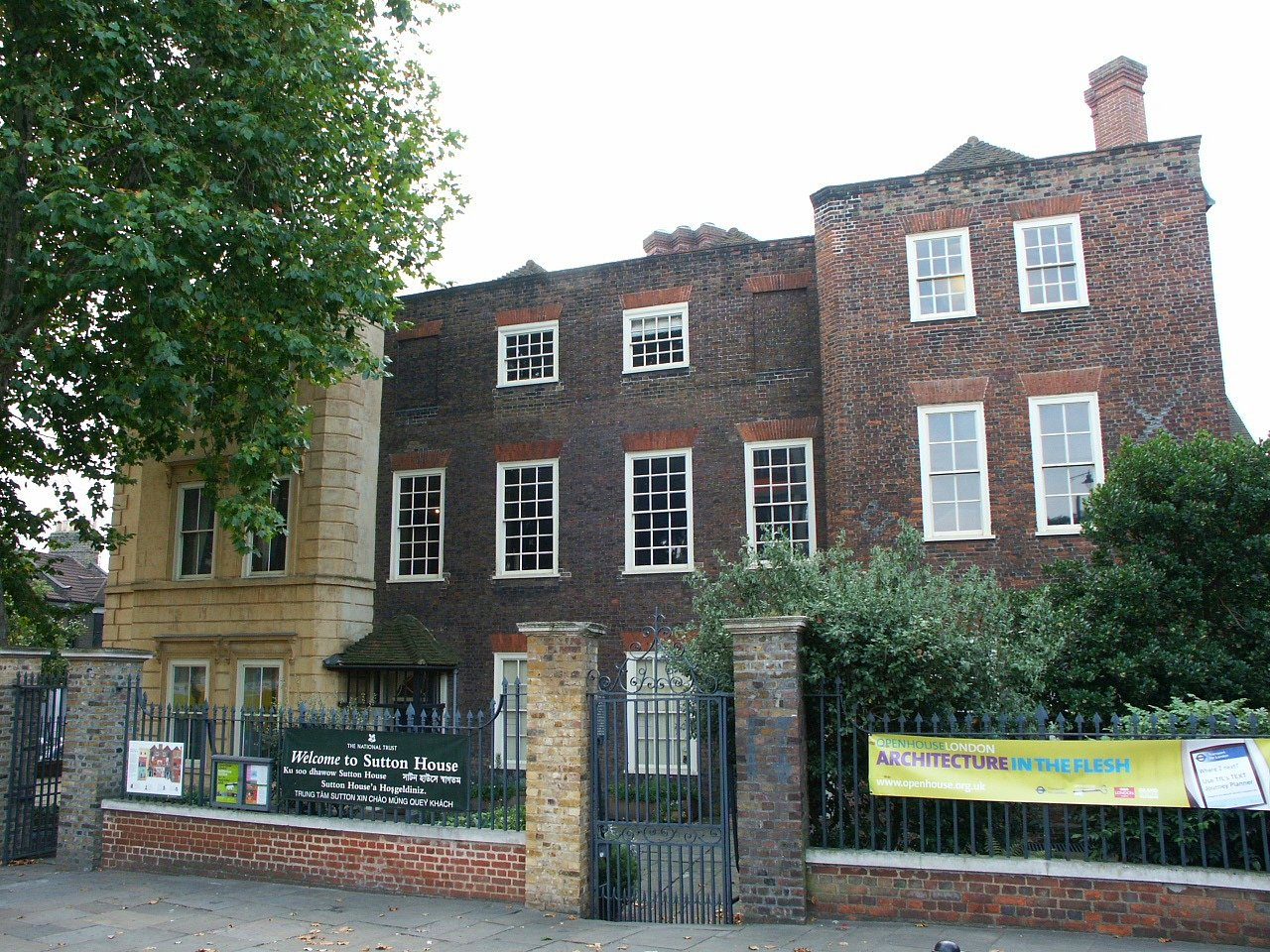
Sutton House, Hackney, was built in 1535 by Sir Ralph Sadler

== Family and early life ==
Ralph Sadler was born in Hackney, Middlesex, the elder son of Henry Sadler, a minor official in the service of the Marquess of Dorset and Sir Edward Belknap. Henry Sadler was originally from Warwickshire, but later settled in Hackney. Ralph had a brother, John, who commanded a company at the Siege of Boulogne in 1544.

At around seven years of age, Sadler was placed in the household of Thomas Cromwell, later Earl of Essex, where he received an excellent education. He was taught to read and write, becoming fluent in French, Latin and Greek, and acquired a working knowledge of the law. He proved to be not only intelligent and resourceful but also capable of great feats of horsemanship and was skilled at falconry.

Roger Ascham compared Sadler's appearance in terms of complexion, countenance and beard to Duke Maurice, although the Duke was taller. Sadler is also represented by his tomb effigy at Standon, and he may have been painted by Hans Holbein the Younger in 1535.

== Courtier and diplomat ==
Sadler began his career as secretary to Thomas Cromwell and went on to serve four Tudor monarchs. During his long career in royal service, he held many offices, including:

- Clerk of the Hanaper 1535–1587
- Gentleman of the Privy Chamber by May 1536
- Ambassador to Scotland 1537, 1540, 1542
- Jointly (with John Godsalve, Gregory Railton and Francis Kempe) prothonotary, Chancery 1537 – 1587?
- Principal Secretary April 1540 – April 1543
- Privy Councillor 1540–1553, 1566–1587
- Master of the Great Wardrobe 1543–1553
- Justice of the Peace Hertfordshire 1544–1547, 1558/59 – 1561, Gloucestershire 1547, Hertfordshire 1562–1587
- Chamberlain or receiver, Court of General Surveyors by 1545
- Commissioner for Musters, Hertfordshire 1546, loan 1546, 1562, goods of churches and fraternities 1550, relief, Hertfordshire and London 1550, ecclesiastical causes 1572
- Steward of Hertford and Constable of Hertford Castle December 1549 – 1554, 1559–1587
- Warden of the East and Middle Marches 1559–1560.
- Custos rotulorum Hertfordshire. by 1562 – 1587
- Chancellor of the Duchy of Lancaster 1568–1587
- Lord Lieutenant, Hertfordshire 1569

=== In the service of Cromwell and the King, 1526 to 1539 ===
By the time he was nineteen Sadler was serving as Thomas Cromwell's secretary, learning about administration, finance and politics. In this role, he handled Cromwell's household business and was also involved in drafting and writing his correspondence. By 1529 he had become one of Cromwell's most trusted friends and was appointed an executor of his will. Between 1525 and 1529, his name appeared in Cromwell's correspondence in connection with the suppression of monasteries. It was probably around this time that his talents came to the attention of the king. He was granted the manor and lands from the suppressed St Leonard's Priory in Bow.

It was probably soon after Cromwell's elevation to the peerage, on 9 July 1536, that Sadler was named a gentleman of the Privy Chamber. In the same year, he became MP for Hindon, Wiltshire and his name also appears in the list of administrators named for Catherine of Aragon's will.

In January 1537, Sadler was sent to Scotland to investigate complaints made by Margaret Tudor, the King's sister, against her third husband, Henry Stewart, 1st Lord Methven, and to improve Anglo-Scottish relations. He succeeded in both respects. On 1 April 1537, Ralph met James V of Scotland, newly married to Madeleine of Valois, at Rouen. In 1537 he was sent to report on the state of Newcastle upon Tyne and reported that it was a "strong town" and complimented its defences

Henry VIII was pleased with Sadler's work and sent him again to Scotland with a gift of horses. He was intended to discourage James V from accepting Cardinal Beaton's proposed Franco-Scottish alliance. Sadler failed in that respect, but Henry VIII was nonetheless impressed with his work. As a New Year's Day gift in 1539, Sadler gave Henry VIII a gold signet ring with a dial. Later in that year, he was elected knight of the shire (MP) for Middlesex.

In 1535 Sadler built Sutton House in Hackney, It is a red-brick, three-storey H-plan structure. Sadler sold the house and surrounding estate to John Machell, a cloth merchant, in 1550, having built a grander house, Standon Lordship, in Hertfordshire.

In 1576, Thomas Avery of Berden, Essex, bequeathed to Sadler a gold table or locket with an image of Cromwell, a reminder of his old master who was executed in July 1540.

=== Mr. Secretary: Henry VIII and Edward VI, 1540 to 1557 ===
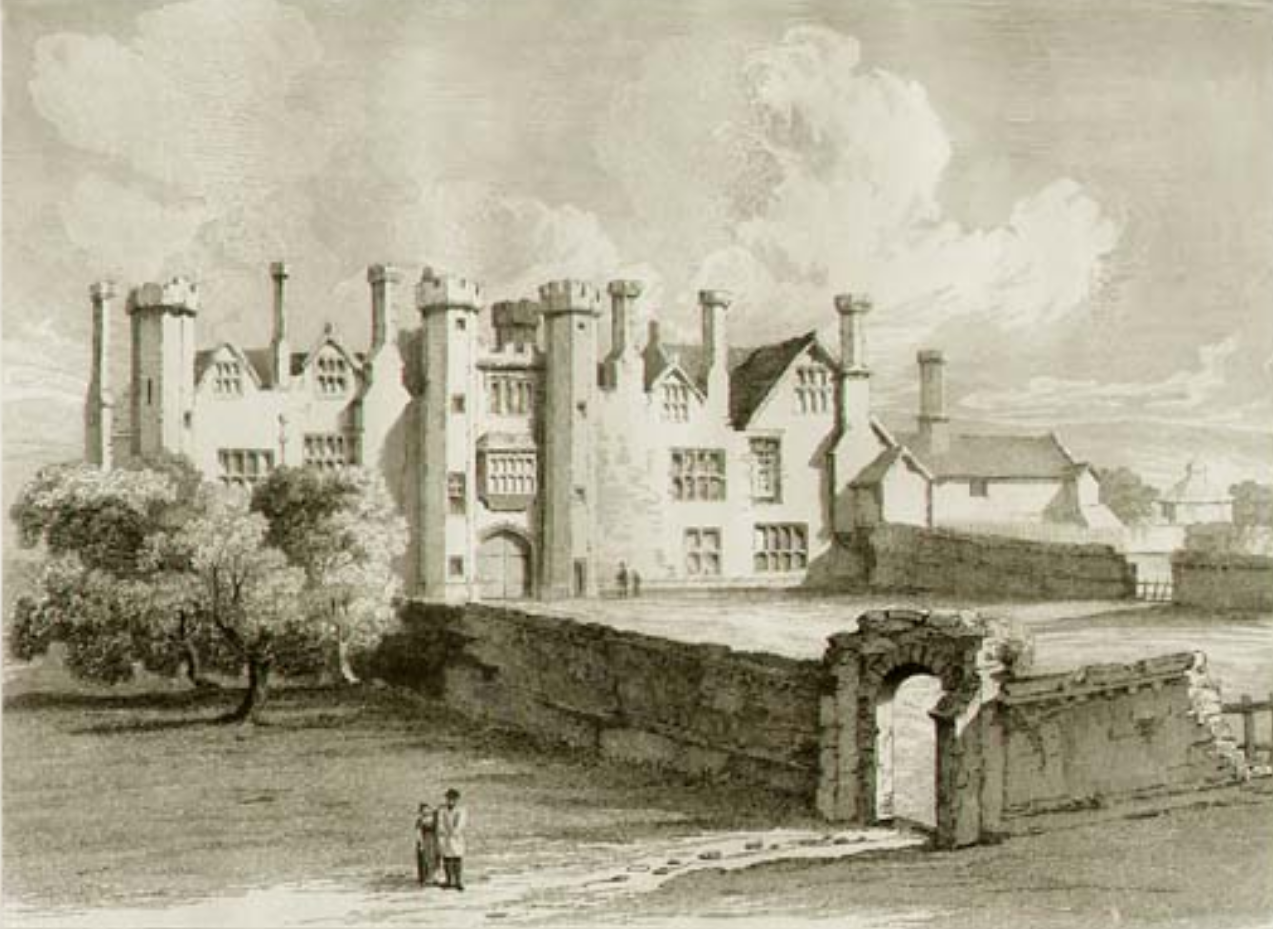
Standon Lordship was built by Sadler on his estate at Standon, Hertfordshire, which he acquired in 1544. Standon remained in the possession of the Sadler family until the death of the last male heir, Ralph Sadler, in 1661. Drawn by Robert Clutterbuck and etched by Edward Blore for History and Antiquities of the County of Hertford, Vol. 3, (1827)

In April 1540 Sadler was made principal secretary to the king, a position he held jointly with Thomas Wriothesley; on 18 April 1540 he was knighted. In the same year he was made a privy councillor, and began more than 30 years of service representing Hertfordshire in Parliament. He represented Preston in 1545.

Sadler survived the fall from power and subsequent execution of his friend and mentor in 1540; however, during the power struggle following Cromwell's demise, he was arrested and sent to the Tower. On the evening of 17 January 1541, the Imperial ambassador, Eustace Chapuys, and the French ambassador, Charles de Marillac, reported to their masters that Sir Ralph Sadler and Sir Thomas Wyatt had been arrested, as had another courtier Sir John Wallop. The following morning they were taken from Hampton Court, with their hands bound, accompanied by 24 archers, to the Tower. Marillac noted that it "must be some great matter" for Wyatt "has for enemies all who leagued against Cromwell, whose minion he was."

Sadler was able to clear himself and was released in a few days, returning to the council chamber. He played a leading role in the examination of Catherine Howard and her relatives in November 1541, having regained the King's trust for his part in attending to matters of state while the court went on a summer progress of the North. Together with his allies in the council, notably Thomas Cranmer, Sadler gathered evidence in an unsuccessful attempt to discredit Norfolk and Gardiner, the men who had orchestrated Thomas Cromwell's downfall.

=== From courtier to career diplomat: mission to Scotland ===
Sadler was sent to Scotland several times. In 1540 he tried to embarrass and undermine the authority of Cardinal Beaton, an ally of France, with letters captured from his messenger Alexander Crichton of Brunstane whose ship had been forced by a storm to put into England. However, James V of Scotland refused to accept that the letters were compromising, and argued in favour of the Cardinal that he had a separate spiritual authority in Scotland apart from the King's own temporal powers. Later, when the Cardinal was present, James and Sadler compared the captured letters with Beaton's copies and found a discrepancy. James V said he was thankful to Sadler and his uncle Henry VIII but still would not find fault in the Cardinal's actions.

Following the Battle of Solway Moss, Sadler was sent to Scotland again, in March 1543, to arrange a marriage between the infant Mary, Queen of Scots, and Edward, Prince of Wales. He was a successful negotiator for the Treaty of Greenwich, although the marriage was not concluded. On 22 March 1543, he rode from Edinburgh to Linlithgow Palace to see the queen for the first time. Mary of Guise asked the nurse Jean Sinclair to show him the queen out of her swaddling clothes. The scene was depicted by a 19th-century artist Benjamin Haydon. Sadler wrote that the infant was "as goodly a child I have seen, and like to live". Mary of Guise reminded him that in turn Regent Arran wanted his son James Hamilton to marry Princess Elizabeth. Mary tried to work on him to intercede for Regent Arran to release Cardinal Beaton from imprisonment, alleging the Cardinal's political expertise could be employed to mutual benefit. Henry VIII wanted English servants in Mary's household, and Sadler recommended "Lady Edongcomb" for this role, his friend, Katherine Edgcumbe the widow of Peter Edgecumbe of Cotehele.

Sadler closely followed a controversy at Linlithgow between Arran and Cardinal Beaton in July 1543. When an agreement was reached, the Earl of Lennox escorted Mary to Stirling Castle. On 9 August 1543 Sadler wrote to Henry VIII describing his visit to Mary of Guise and the infant Queen;

(Mary of Guise) is very glad that she is at Stirling, and much she praised the air about the house, and told me, "That her daughter did grow apace; and soon," she said, "she would soon be a woman, if she took of her mother;" who indeed, is of the largest stature of women. And therefore she caused also the child to be brought to me, to the intent I might see her, assuring your majesty, that she is a right fair and goodly child, as any that I have seen for her age."

By November Sadler, fearing for his safety as the mood in Edinburgh turned against England, moved to Tantallon Castle, which belonged to the Earl of Angus. Regent Arran sent the Rothesay Herald to Tantallon, ordering him to return Sadler to England, having "seen daily his great practices made to seduce and corrupt true faithful subjects of this realm to the opinion of England." The Earl's kinsmen conveyed him to Berwick upon Tweed on 11 December 1543. All of his work in solidifying Anglo-Scottish relations came to nothing, and war followed after the Scottish rejection of Treaty of Greenwich in December 1543.

Sadler was replaced by William Paget as Secretary of State in April 1543, owing to his frequent absences on diplomatic missions, but was appointed Master of the Great Wardrobe. He was treasurer for the war against Scotland with the Earl of Hertford during his punitive expedition to Edinburgh in May 1544. Sadler accompanied Hertford into Scotland, in the same role in September 1545. He accompanied Lord Hertford again, this time at the Battle of Pinkie in the post of High Treasurer of the Army. On 10 September 1547, in recognition of his services during the fighting, Sadler was made a knight banneret.

Sadler was present when Stephen Gardiner, Bishop of Winchester, was arrested, and he also accompanied the force that put down Robert Kett's Norfolk Rebellion. When Henry VIII was preparing his will on Boxing Day 1546, he had already appointed Sadler onto the Council of Regency that was to rule England during Edward VI's minority and left him £200 in his will.

In 1550 Sadler sold his mansion at Hackney. He was one of the signatories of Edward VI's will in 1553, proving one of the radicals in a Protestant government. He signed the device settling the crown on the Protestant Jane Grey, and was noted by Lord Burghley as one of those expected to act on her behalf.

=== Mary I and Elizabeth I, 1558 to 1587 ===
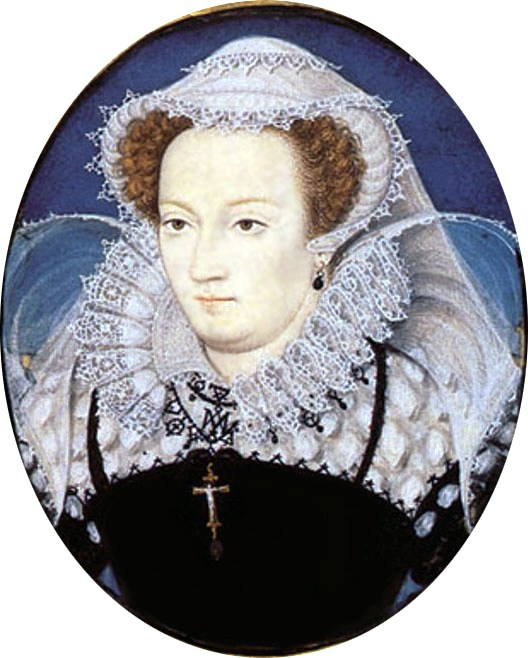
Miniature of Mary Stuart, Queen of Scots

On the accession of the Catholic Mary I to the throne, after the resolution of the succession crisis, Sadler lost most of his offices, including master of the great wardrobe, he was removed from the commissions of the peace and excluded from the Privy Council. He was briefly under house arrest from 25 to 30 July 1553 before being granted a pardon on 6 October. For the rest of Mary I's reign he did not sit in any parliament, remaining in semi-retirement at Standon, Hertfordshire.

During the reign of Elizabeth I, restored to royal favour, Sadler was sent to Scotland on 8 August 1559 to arrange an alliance with the Scottish Protestants, and forward the cause of the Lords of the Congregation and Duke of Chatelherault. After the English became directly involved in the fighting at the Battle of Leith, he was one of the architects of the Treaty of Edinburgh. In 1568 he was appointed Chancellor of the Duchy of Lancaster.

=== Mary, Queen of Scots ===
When Mary, Queen of Scots, fled to England in 1568 after the battle of Langside, Sadler was unwillingly appointed to meet with the Scottish commissioners regarding that problem. In November 1569, Sadler and Baron Hunsdon went to York, to join the Earl of Sussex and respond to the Rising of the North. The rebel leaders fled to Scotland. Sadler managed a spy Robert Constable who visited the fugitives in January 1570 and tried to persuade them to return to England.

Sadler was keeper of Mary, Queen of Scots, at Sheffield in 1572 during the absence of the Earl of Shrewsbury at court. He was sent to arrest the Duke of Norfolk in Scotland in 1572.

Sadler was again reluctantly appointed gaoler of Mary, Queen of Scots, from the summer 1584 to spring 1585, when she was housed at Wingfield Manor and Tutbury Castle. Mary's secretary Gilbert Curle, devised a code that seemed to include Sadler as the "carrier" and his assistant John Somers as the "carrier's man". An intercepted letter appeared to compromise Somers, and Sadler vouched for his loyalty to Francis Walsingham.

During Mary's time with Sadler, Elizabeth was nervous about Mary's plans against her. Sadler reported that the guards at Sheffield and Wingfield carried swords and daggers, pistols, halberds and partisans. He was instructed to restrict Mary's freedom. Walsingham chid Sadler and Somers for letting Mary ride from Tutbury to go "hawkyng" and for giving her "more lybertye now then at any tyme when she was in the E of Shrewsbury chardge".

According to Andrea Clarke, there was "a tangible, palpable sense of heightened levels of fear among Elizabeth's government and ministers about her safety in the midst of the danger posed by Mary Queen of Scots, who for many Catholics was a figurehead". Sadler was required to post guards round the castle and to search the grounds "once or twice a moneth". After the Babington Plot, Sadler was on the council that sentenced Mary to death.

== Marriage and issue ==
Around 1534, Ralph Sadler married Ellen, daughter of John Mitchell, of Much Hadham, Hertfordshire, who at the time of their marriage was believed to be the widow of Matthew Barre (or Barrow) of Sevenoaks in Kent. The couple had three sons and four daughters:

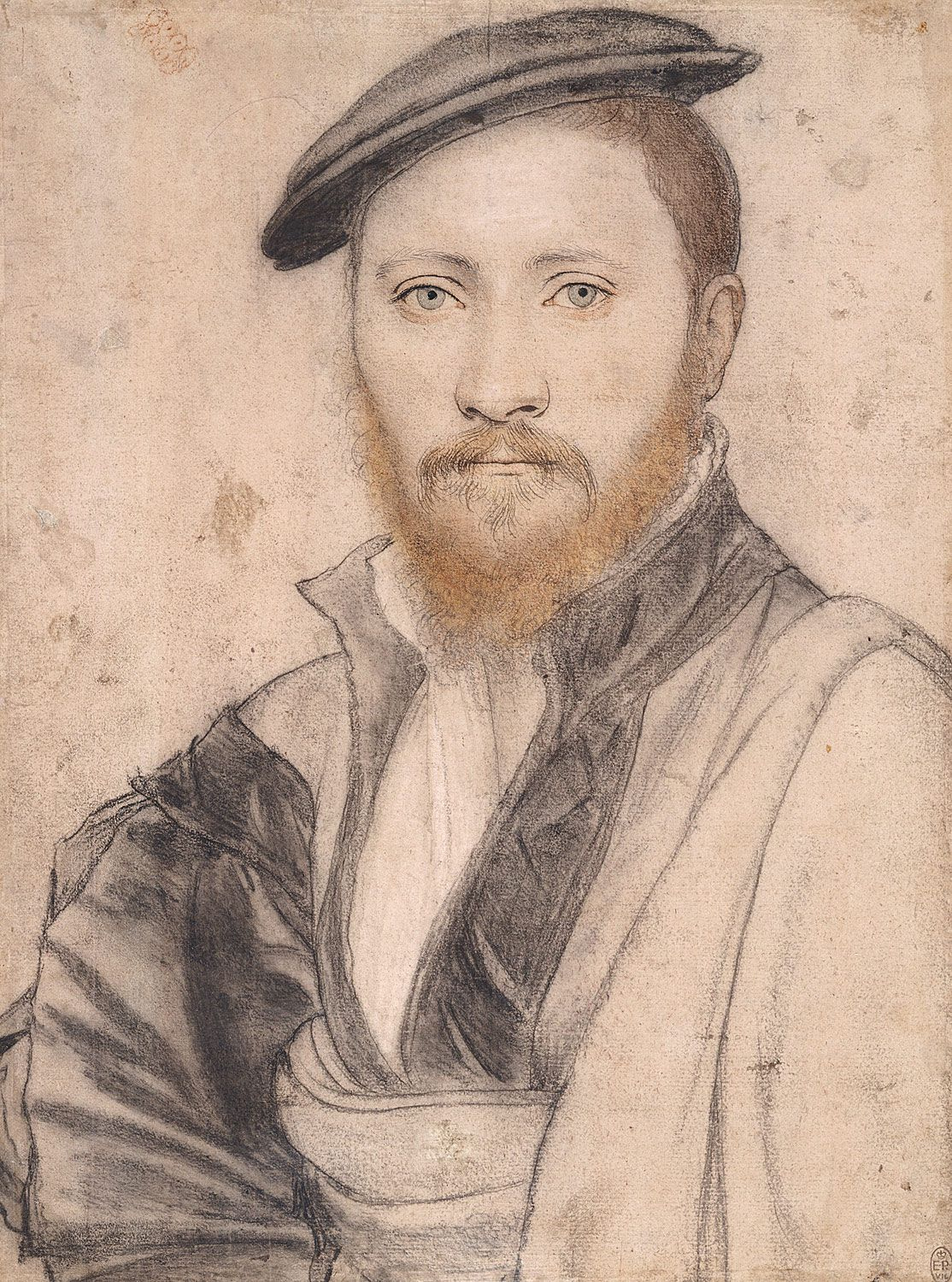
An unidentified man, perhaps Sir Ralph Sadler, 1535, Hans Holbein the Younger

- Sir Thomas Sadler of Standon, Hertfordshire, (c. 1536 – 1607), named after Thomas Cromwell, who succeeded him married twice:

- Ursula, daughter of Sir Henry Sherington of Lacock, Wiltshire
- Gertrude, daughter of Robert Markham, of Cotham, Nottinghamshire, by whom he had a son Ralph, and a daughter Gertrude, who married Walter Aston, 1st Lord Aston of Forfar. On Ralph's death in 1661, Standon passed to Gertrude's son, Walter.

- Edward Sadler of Temple Dinsley, (died 4 April 1584) married Anne, daughter and heir of Sir Richard Lee of Sopwell, Hertfordshire
- Henry Sadler of Everleigh, Wiltshire, (c. 1538 – 1618), married twice:

- Mary, daughter of Gilbert Everley
- Ursula, daughter of John Gill

- Anne Sadler (died 1576), married George Horsey of Digswell, Hertfordshire
- Mary Sadler married Thomas Bolle of Wallington, Hertfordshire
- Jane Sadler (died c. 1587), married Edward Baeshe of Stansted Bury, Hertfordshire.
- Dorothy Sadler (died c. 1578), married Edward Elrington of Byrchall, Essex

Sadler may have had an illegitimate son, Richard.

=== The return of Matthew Barre ===
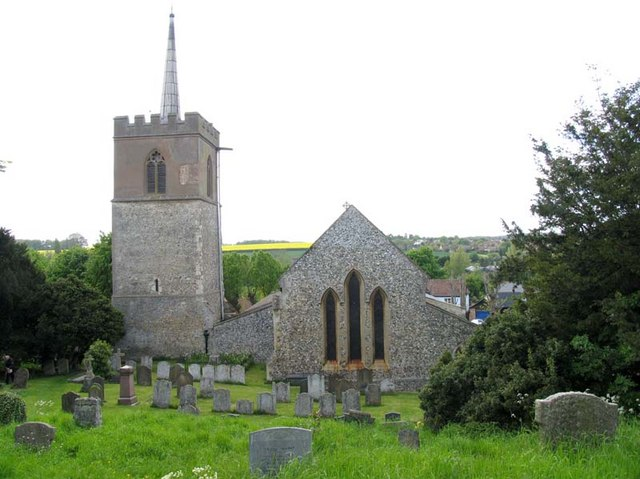
St Mary's Church, Standon, Hertfordshire, where Sadler is buried

More than eleven years after Ralph and Ellen had married, Matthew Barre returned alive from Ireland and was overheard in a London tavern claiming to be the lawful husband of Sadler's wife. Ralph and his wife had seven surviving children, and he was now a very wealthy and influential person at court whose reputation was at stake. Sadler, a man devoted to his wife and children, was informed of the matter in October 1545 while on a diplomatic mission in Scotland. "Master Sadler took his matter very heavily," the Lord Chancellor, Wriothesley reported to Secretary Paget.

Ellen Mitchell and Matthew Barre had been legally married in 1526, in Great Dunmow in Essex. They had two daughters before Barre abandoned them and went to Ireland. Ellen stayed in Dunmow for about a year trying to find out where he had gone. She then became a servant of the prioress at the nunnery of Clerkenwell. Determined to find Matthew, she visited his birthplace and with his brothers made further enquiries, but without success. Despairing of an answer she returned to Clerkenwell. Not long afterwards a man belonging to the city of Salisbury positively assured her that her husband was dead. Recommended by the Prioress of Clerkenwell, Ellen entered the service of Thomas Cromwell's mother-in-law, Mercy Pryor, and was dwelling in his house when Ralph Sadler became enamoured of her. Ralph Sadler and Ellen married believing that Matthew Barre was dead.

A version of Ellen's story was given by an Elizabethan writer, Nicholas Sanders, and attempted to cast doubt on her character, without success. Sanders claimed that Ellen (née Mitchell) was related to Thomas Cromwell, and that she had worked for him in his household. Given that Cromwell was known to take pity on widows, this is not unlikely. The 17th-century historian Gilbert Burnet considered that Sanders' story was a fiction. Sanders was a Jesuit, a Catholic recusant writing with an agenda. He took delight in attempting to discredit leading public figures in England. There was no scandal surrounding the marriage between Ellen and Ralph when it took place. Cromwell's paternal aunt was Margaret Mitchell, and Ellen may have been a relative of Margaret and her husband William, or William's brother Thomas, all of whom once lived with and worked for Walter Cromwell. Rather than slandering Ellen and Ralph, this shows a friendly familial beginning.

Legitimation of Sir Ralph Sadler's Children Act 1545
- Act of Parliament
- Parliament of England
- Long title: An Act for the Legitimation of the children of Sir Ralph Sadler, Knight.
- Citation: 37 Hen. 8. c. 30 Pr. (Ruffhead: 37 Hen. 8. c. 7 Pr.)
- Territorial extent: England and Wales

Dates
- Royal assent: 24 December 1545

Status: Current legislation

An investigation found that Ellen's first marriage was valid, and Sadler was therefore obliged to have his children legitimised by a private act of Parliament. In 1546, this act of Parliament, Legitimation of Sir Ralph Sadler's Children Act 1545 (37 Hen. 8. c. 30 Pr.) was passed on his behalf. The act set aside Ellen's marriage to Matthew Barre and made her marriage to Ralph Sadler a true and proper union. Sadler managed to prevent the publication of the act and its details never appeared among the statutes of the period. The only known contemporary reference to the act appears in a transcript entitled The Unprecedented Case of Sir Ralph Sadleir in the Library of the Inner Temple. Matthew Barre disappeared from the scene.

This episode damaged Sadler's reputation, but not irretrievably. His marriage to Ellen was saved and the couple lived on, without further incident, for many years. Sadler's wife was still living in 1569; however, there is no further record of her and there is no surviving tomb for her.

== Death ==
Sir Ralph Sadler died 30 March 1587, reputedly, "the richest commoner in England". His tomb lies beneath a magnificent wall monument in St Mary's Church, Standon, Hertfordshire.

Sadler left the majority of his vast landholdings, including Standon and Buntingford, Hertfordshire, to his eldest son and heir, Thomas Sadler. Henry Sadler received the manors of Hungerford, Berkshire, and Everley, Wiltshire, Jane Bash received a diamond ring and an annuity was provided for Richard Sadler.

== Works ==
Sadler is one of the few Renaissance statesmen for whom extant Parliamentary orations survive, including a speech on succession in 1563 and one on subsidy in 1566. Copies of the orations appear in the 1809 two-volume publication of his letters edited by Arthur Clifford, which includes a biography by Walter Scott.

== Fictional portrayals ==
Sadler (styled as 'Rafe Sadler') is one of the major characters in Hilary Mantel's 2009 novel Wolf Hall, which gives a fictional portrayal of Sadler's youth and early manhood in the household of Thomas Cromwell. He also appears prominently in Bring Up the Bodies and The Mirror & the Light, Mantel's sequels to Wolf Hall. During the BBC TV series Wolf Hall, Sadler is portrayed by Thomas Brodie-Sangster.

He is also a minor character in Philippa Gregory's book The Other Queen, with an account given of the time he spent as gaoler of Mary, Queen of Scots.

== Arms ==
Coat of arms of Ralph Sadler
Adopted 1575 Crest A demi-lion rampant azure ducally crowned, or. Escutcheon Or, a lion rampant, party per fess, azure and gules, armed and langued, argent. Motto Servire Deo Sapere (Latin for 'To serve God is to be wise')

== See also ==
- Secretary of State (England)
- Privy Councillor

== Sources ==
- Akkerman, Nadine; Langman, Pete (2024). Spycraft: Tricks and Tools of the Dangerous Trade from Elizabeth I to the Restoration. New Haven: Yale University Press. ISBN 9780300267549. OCLC 0300267541.
- Alford, Stephen (2002). The Early Elizabethan Polity: William Cecil and the British Succession Crisis, 1558–1569. Cambridge Studies in Early Modern British History. Cambridge: Cambridge University Press. ISBN 9780521892858. OCLC 49044617.
- Ascham, Roger (1904). "A Report and Discourse of the Affaires and State of Germany and the Emperour Charles his Court, Duryng Certaine Years While the Sayd Roger Was There". In Wright, William Aldis (ed.). English Works: Toxophilus; Report and Discourse of the Affaires and State of Germany; The Scholemaster. Cambridge English Classics. Cambridge: Cambridge University Press. pp. 121–169. OCLC 953923728.
- Bain, Joseph, ed. (1898). Calendar of the State Papers Relating to Scotland and Mary, Queen of Scots, 1547–1603; Preserved in the Public Record Office, the British Museum, and Elsewhere in England. Vol. 1: A.D.1547–1563. Edinburgh: H. M. General Register Office. OCLC 1416922574.
- ——, ed. (1890). The Hamilton Papers: Letters and Papers Illustrating the Political Relations of England and Scotland in the XVIth Century Formerly in the Possession of the Dukes of Hamilton, Now in the British Museum. Vol. 1: A.D. 1532–1543. Edinburgh: H. M. General Register House.
- Belcher, Victor (2004). Sutton House: A Tudor Courtier's House in Hackney. Swindon: English Heritage. ISBN 978-1-873-59256-4.
- Boyd, William K., ed. (1913). Calendar of the State Papers Relating to Scotland and Mary, Queen of Scots, 1547–1603; Preserved in the Public Record Office, the British Museum, and Elsewhere in England. Vol. 7: A.D.1584–1585. Edinburgh: H. M. General Register Office. OCLC 1416922574.
- Burke, Bernard (1912). Genealogical and Heraldic History of the Landed Gentry of Ireland (new ed.). London: Harrison & Sons. pp. 615–618.
- Burnet, Gilbert (1865). Pocock, Nicholas (ed.). The History of the Reformation of the Church of England. Vol. V. Oxford: Clarendon Press.
- Caldwell, David; Oleksy, Vicky; Rhodes, Bess (2023). The Battle of Pinkie, 1547: The Last Battle between the Independent Kingdoms of Scotland and England. Oxford: Oxbow Books. doi:10.2307/jj.5590540. ISBN 9781789259735. JSTOR jj.5590540. OCLC 10029339244.
- "Calendar of State Papers, Scotland" – via British History Online.(subscription required)
- Chisholm, Hugh, ed. (1911). "Sadler, Sir Ralph" . Encyclopædia Britannica. Vol. 23 (11th ed.). Cambridge University Press. pp. 993–994.
- Charleton, Robert John (1899). A History of Newcastle upon Tyne from the earliest records to its formation as a city. London: Walter Scott Ltd.
- Cooke, Robert; St. George, Richard (1886). Metcalfe, Walter C. (ed.). The Visitations of Hertfordshire, Made by Robert Cooke, Esq., Clarencieux in 1572, Sir Richard St. George, Kt., Clarencieux in 1634 ... The Publications of the Harleian Society. Vol. XXII. London: Harleian Society.
- Coros, D. F. (1982). "Sadler, Ralph (1507–87), of Hackney, Mdx., Standon, Herts. and Lesnes, Kent". In Bindoff, S. T. (ed.). The History of Parliament: the House of Commons 1509–1558. Archived from the original on 11 January 2012 – via The History of Parliament Online.
- Drummond, Humphrey (1969). Our Man in Scotland: Sir Ralph Sadleir, 1507–1587. London: Frewin. ISBN 0090965108.
- Emmison, F. G. (1978). Elizabethan Life: Wills of Essex Gentry and Merchants Proved in the Prerogative Court of Canterbury. Essex Record Office publications. No. 71. Chelmsford: Essex County Counci. ISBN 9780900360503. OCLC 4993654.
- Gray, Mike (2000). "Sadleir of Sutton House and Standon Lordship: An Iconography". Hackney History. 6. Friends of Hackney Archives: 3–9. ISSN 1360-3795.
- Great Britain. Record Commission (1830). State Papers of King Henry the Eighth. Vol. 5. G. Eyre and A. Strahan. OCLC 679826322.
- Harvey, William; Cooke, Robert; Owen, George (1884). Blaydes, Frederic Augustus (ed.). The Visitations of Bedfordshire, Annis Domini 1566, 1582, and 1634 ... The Publications of the Harleian Society. Vol. XIX. London: Harleian Society.
- Harvey, William (1897). Metcalfe, Walter C. (ed.). The Visitation of Wiltshire, 1565 ... Exeter: William Pollard & Co.
- Hasler, P. W. (1981). "Sadler, Sir Ralph (1507–87), of Standon, Herts". In Hasler, P. W. (ed.). The History of Parliament: the House of Commons 1558–1603 – via The History of Parliament Online.
- Hayward, Maria (2005). "Gift Giving at the Court of Henry VIII: The 1539 New Year's Gift Roll in Context". The Antiquaries Journal. 85: 126–175. doi:10.1017/S0003581500074382.
- Heal, Ambrose (May 1943). "A Great Country House in 1623". The Burlington Magazine for Connoisseurs. 82 (482): 108–116. JSTOR 868565.
- Heal, Felicity (2014). "Royal Gifts and Gift-Exchange in Sixteenth-Century Anglo-Scottish Politics". In Boardman, Stephen I.; Goodare, Julian (eds.). Kings, Lords and Men in Scotland and Britain, 1300–1625: Essays in Honour of Jenny Wormald. Edinburgh: Edinburgh University Press. pp. 283–300. doi:10.1515/9780748691517-018. ISBN 9780748691517. OCLC 888747354.
- Henderson, Thomas Finlayson (1897). "Sadler, Ralph" . In Lee, Sidney (ed.). Dictionary of National Biography. Vol. 50. London: Smith, Elder & Co. pp. 109–112.
- Hunter Blair, Charles Henry (2019) [1950]. "Wardens and Deputy wardens of the Marches of England towards Scotland in Northumberland and the English Wardens of Berwick upon Tweed". Archaeologia Aeliana. 28: 18–95. doi:10.5284/1060129.
- Inner Temple Library (1806). A Catalogue of the Printed Books and Manuscripts in the Library of the Inner Temple. London: Printed by C. and W. Galabin. pp. 116-118. OCLC 952963190.
- Leader, John Daniel (1880). Mary Queen of Scots in Captivity. Sheffield: Leader & Sons. OCLC 1049693459.
- "Letters and Papers, Foreign and Domestic, Henry VIII" – via British History Online.
- Marshall, Rosalind K. (2006). Queen Mary's Women: Female Relatives, Servants, Friends and Enemies of Mary Queen of Scots. Edinburgh: Birlinn. ISBN 0859766675.
- Parker, K. T. (1945). The Drawings of Hans Holbein at Windsor Castle. Oxford: Phaidon.
- Paul, James Balfour (1907). Accounts of the Lord High Treasurer of Scotland. Vol. 7. Edinburgh: H.M. General Register House.
- Phillips, Gervase (2004). "Sadler, Sir Ralph". Oxford Dictionary of National Biography (online ed.). Oxford: Oxford University Press. doi:10.1093/ref:odnb/24462. (Subscription, Wikipedia Library access or UK public library membership required.)
- "Portrait of a Man (Sir Ralph Sadler?)". The Metropolitan Museum of Art. Collections. Metmuseum.org.
- Sadler, Ralph; Scott, Walter (1809). Clifford, Arthur (ed.). The State Papers and Letters of Sir Ralph Sadler. Vol. I. Edinburgh: Archibald Constable and Co. OCLC 1065736711.
- Sadler, Ralph; Scott, Walter (1809). Clifford, Arthur (ed.). The State Papers and Letters of Sir Ralph Sadler. Vol. II. Edinburgh: Archibald Constable and Co. OCLC 1065736711.
- Sander, Nicolas (1877). Rise and Growth of the Anglican Schism, Translated with an Introduction by David Lewis. Translated by Lewis, David. London: Burns and Oates.
- Schofield, John (2011). The Rise & Fall of Thomas Cromwell: Henry VIII's Most Faithful Servant. Stroud: The History Press. ISBN 978-0-7524-5866-3.
- Scott, Jade (2024). Captive Queen: The Decrypted History of Mary, Queen of Scots. London: Michael O'Mara Books. ISBN 9781789297171. OCLC 1425941007.
- Slavin, A. J. (2008) [1966]. Politics and profit: A Study of Sir Ralph Sadler 1507-1547. Cambridge: Cambridge University Press. ISBN 9780521089333.
- Stoney, F. Sadleir (1877). A Memoir of the Life and Times of the Right Honourable Sir Ralph Sadleir. London: Longmans, Green & Co.
- Strype, John (1822). Ecclesiastical Memorials. Vol. I, Pt. II. Oxford: Clarendon Press.
- Templeman, David (2016). Mary, Queen of Scots, the Captive Queen in England 1568–87. Primedia E-launch LLC. ISBN 9781684187171.
- Urban, Sylvanus (January–June 1835). "Family of Sir Ralph Sadler". The Gentleman's Magazine, and Historical Chronicle, by Sylvanus Urban, Gent. Vol. III. London: Nichols, Son, and Bentley.
- Warnicke, Retha (2006). Mary, Queen of Scots. London: Routledge. doi:10.4324/9780203088487. ISBN 9780203088487. OCLC 70901859.
- Weir, Alison (2008). Henry VIII: King and Court. London: Vintage Books. ISBN 9780099532422.

Honorary titles
Preceded by Sir Thomas Parry	Custos Rotulorum of Hertfordshire bef. 1562 – 1587	Succeeded by Sir John Brograve
Political offices
Preceded by Thomas Cromwell	Secretary of State; 1540–1543; With: Sir Thomas Wriothesley	Succeeded by Sir Thomas Wriothesley; Sir William Paget
Preceded by Sir Ambrose Cave	Chancellor of the Duchy of Lancaster; 1568–1577	Succeeded by Sir Francis Walsingham
