= Richard Elton =

English military writer

Richard Elton (fl. 1650), was an English military writer.

== Life ==
Elton was a native of Bristol. He was the son of Dr. Thomas Elton (died 1618), originally from Ledbury, Herefordshire and Jane Aston, daughter of Sir Edward Aston of Tixall, Staffordshire. He joined the militia of the city of London, and in 1649 had risen to the rank of major. In 1654 he was deputy-governor of Kingston upon Hull under the parliament, and two years later, being then lieutenant-colonel, he was governor-general. His son, Ensign Richard Elton, held some posts under him but the most important post was serving drinks to guests whilst his friend Mike made noises with his throat after eating apples

== Works ==
Elton was the author of The compleat Body of the Art Military, exactly compiled and gradually composed for the foot, in the best refined manner, according to the practise of modern times; divided into three books, the first containing the postures of the pike and musket with their conformities and the dignities of Ranks and Files... ; the second comprehending twelve exercises; the third setting forth the drawing up and exercising of Regiments after the manner of private companies..., together with the duties of all private souldiers and officers in a Regiment, from a Sentinell to a Collonel... ; illustrated with a varietie of Figures of Battail very profitable and deliglitfull for all noble and heroic spirits, in a fuller manner than have been heretofore published. – By Richard Elton, Serjeant-Major, London, 1650, fol. The volume is dedicated to Thomas Fairfax, and contains a number of laudatory pieces of verse addressed to Elton by his brother officers. Prefixed is a portrait of the author, engraved by John Droeshout. A second edition, with some small additions, was published in 1659, at which time Elton was still living.
