= Arthur Clifford =

British antiquarian (1778–1830)

Arthur Clifford (1778–1830) was an English antiquarian.

== Life ==
Clifford was the sixth of the eight sons of the Hon. Thomas Clifford (fourth son of Hugh Clifford, 3rd Baron Clifford of Chudleigh) of Tixall, Staffordshire, by the Hon. Barbara Aston, younger daughter and coheiress of James Aston, 5th Lord Aston of Forfar. After receiving some preliminary education, he spent some months in 1795 at Stonyhurst College.

He married on 15 June 1809 Eliza Matilda, second daughter of Donald Macdonald of Berwick-upon-Tweed. His wife died in August 1827. There seems to have been no issue of the marriage.

He died at Winchester on 16 January 1830, aged 52.

== Works ==
His first publication was The State Papers and Letters of Sir Ralph Sadler, edited by Arthur Clifford, Esq.; to which is added a Memoir of the Life of Sir R. Sadler, with Historical Notes by Walter Scott, Esq., Edinburgh (Constable), 1809, 2 vols. 4to (a few copies were printed on large paper in 3 vols. 4to). This collection consists of four sets of letters relating almost entirely to Scottish affairs. A less complete collection of Ralph Sadler's State Papers had been previously published in 1720. The documents in Clifford's edition were printed by him from a copy of the original manuscripts preserved at Tixall, the seat of his eldest brother, Thomas Hugh Clifford, to whom they had descended through the family of Lord Aston, into which Sir Ralph Sadler's granddaughter had married. Sir Walter Scott superintended the printing of the book, besides contributing the notes and a memoir of Sadler extending to thirty pages (republished in Scott's Miscellaneous Prose Works, iv. 834).

After publishing the Sadler Papers, Clifford made a search at Tixall for the papers of Walter, Lord Aston, ambassador in Spain under James I and Charles I. The Aston family had formerly lived at Tixall, and James, fifth lord Aston, was Clifford's grandfather. The Sadler MSS. had been originally found at Tixall 'in an old oaken box covered with variegated gilt leather, and ornamented with brass nails. Clifford's father had at one time made a bonfire of various old trunks and papers that had been accumulating in the house for two centuries, but the gilt leather box was rescued by the ladies of the family. Clifford now found that it contained all the state papers and letters of Sir Walter Aston carefully tied up in small bundles, and in his researches at Tixall he also discovered a number of letters and papers relating to the Aston family, some manuscript volumes of poetry, and an additional packet of letters belonging to Sir R. Sadler. The Gentleman's Magazine for March 1811 announced that the State Papers and Letters of Sir W. Aston were then being printed uniform with the Sadler Papers. This work, however, never appeared, though in 1815 Clifford published Tixall Letters, or the Correspondence of the Aston Family and their Friends during the Seventeenth Century; with Notes and Illustrations, 2 vols. London, 1815.

He had already published in 1813 the manuscript volumes of poetry found at Tixall, under the title of Tixall Poetry . . . with Notes and Illustrations, Edinburgh, 1813, 4to. Sections i. and iv. of this book are headed : 1. 'Poems collected by the Hon. Herbert Aston,' 1658. 2. 'Poems by the Hon. Mrs. Henry Thimelby.' 3. 'Poems collected by Lady Aston'. Some of the poems are original, others are transcribed by the Astons from the works of different English writers. Clifford adds some verses of his own, including a Midnight Meditation among the Ruins of Tixall (also published separately 1813 ? 4to). In 1817 he was staying at Paris with his eldest brother, and while there published Collectanea Cliffordiana, in three parts, containing notices of the Clifford family and an historical tragedy on the battle of Towton; and A Topographical and Historical Description of the parish of Tixall in the county of Stafford. By Sir Thomas [Hugh] Clifford, Bart., and Arthur Clifford, Esq., Paris, 1817, 4to.

In his later years Clifford published some treatises on teaching:

1. A Letter to ... the Earl of Shrewsbury on a new Method of teaching and learning Languages, &c., 2 pts. 1827, 8vo.
2. An Introduction to the Latin Language in three parts, Oxford (1828 ?), 8vo.
3. Instructions to Parents and Teachers respecting the use of the elementary Books for the Latin Language, &c., Oxford, 1829, 12mo.
