= Walter Aston, 1st Lord Aston of Forfar =

English courtier and diplomat

The Right Honourable Walter Aston KB
- Lord Aston of Forfar
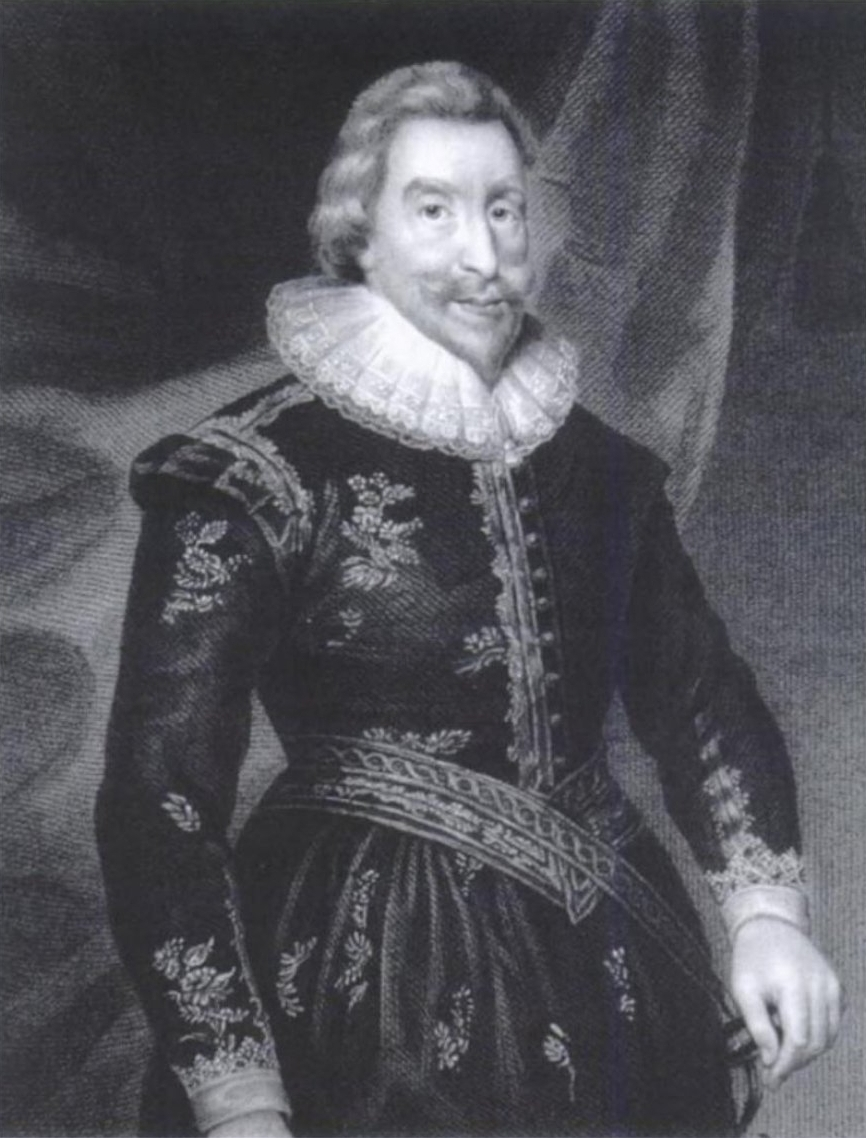
- Walter Aston, 1st Lord Aston of Forfar

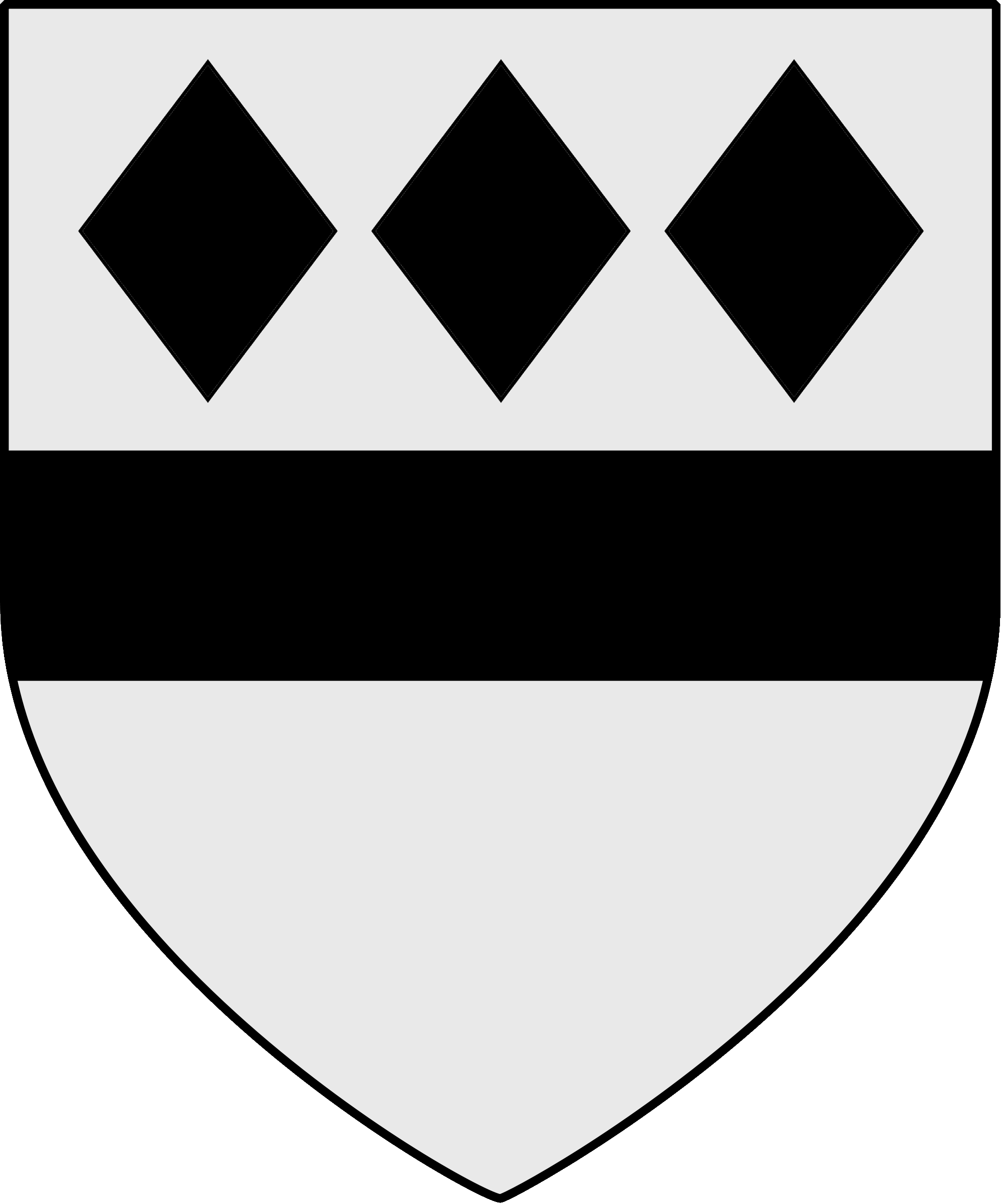
- Coat of arms
- Reign: James I; Charles I
- Successor: Walter Aston, 2nd Lord Aston of Forfar
- Born: Before 9 July 1584; Tixall, Staffordshire
- Died: 13 August 1639 (aged 55)
- Buried: St Mary's Church, Stafford
- Residence: Tixall Hall
- Noble family: Aston
- Spouses: Anne Barnes (m. 1600, annulled) Gertrude Sadler (m. 1607)
- Issue: Walter Aston; Walter Aston, 2nd Lord Aston of Forfar; Herbert Aston; John Aston; Thomas Aston; Gertrude Aston; Honor Aston; Frances Aston; Gertrude Aston; Constance Aston
- Father: Edward Aston
- Mother: Anne Lucy Barnes
- Occupation: Diplomat

Walter Aston, 1st Lord Aston of Forfar KB (baptised 9 July 1584 – 13 August 1639) was an English courtier and diplomat.

== Life ==
Aston was born in Staffordshire, England, about 1584; he was a son of Sir Edward Aston of Tixall and his second wife Anne Lucy Barnes of Charlecote Park, daughter of Sir Thomas Lucy.

Upon his father's death on 1 February 1597, Edward Coke, the Attorney General, was appointed his guardian, by Lord Burghley, master of the Court of Wards.

In 1603, at the coronation of King James I of England, Aston was created a Knight of the Bath at which Michael Drayton the poet acted as his esquire (Aston had become his patron and, between 1602 and 1607, Drayton dedicated five of his works to Sir Walter). In 1611, after paying a fee of £1095, Sir Walter was created Baronet of Tixall. In 1618, he was appointed steward of the honour of Tutbury by James I.

In 1620, Sir Walter was sent to Madrid as the resident ambassador to the Spanish court to negotiate a marriage between Charles, the Prince of Wales, and the Infanta Maria Anna of Spain and also provisions for joint naval operations to patrol and suppress piracy.

The Prince of Wales (the future Charles I of England), accompanied by the Duke of Buckingham, arrived at the Spanish court in 1623 unannounced: his overtures to the Infanta were rejected and so the marriage proposal fell through.

Despite the failure of Aston's mission, for his good service to Charles (in opposing the opinions of the ambassador John, Earl of Bristol), Charles was grateful to him and once he became King helped Sir Walter both socially and financially. Charles pardoned Sir Walter for recusancy (while in Spain he had converted to Catholicism in 1623): this allowed him to serve in local government and in 1631 he was made a commissioner for Warwickshire to enforce a fine upon gentry who failed to appear at Charles's coronation to receive a knighthood.

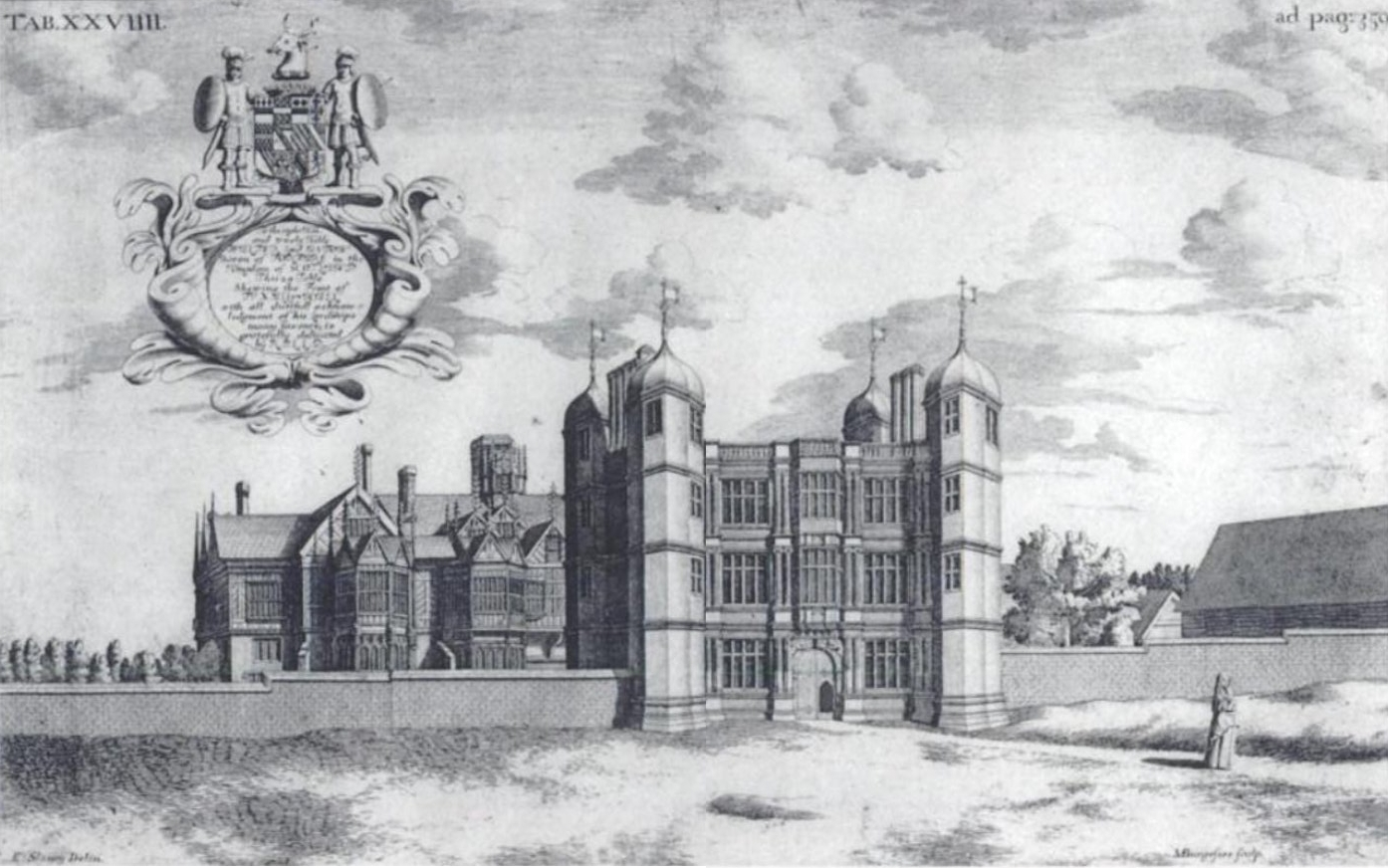
Tixall House and Gatehouse (c. 1686) by R. Plot. Tixall was the family seat of the Lords Aston of Forfar.

Sir Walter claimed that his expenses in Spain had been ruinous, and cost him £14,000. To make amends Charles arranged that he be elevated to the Scottish peerage on 28 November 1627, as Baron Forfar in county Angus, and gave him a bond of £1000 to buy land in Scotland. Charles also appointed him "keeper of the king's mulberry garden" at St James's with an annual income of £60. He also arranged an annual pension of £50 for Sir Walter and the same for his wife. Just over a year later in December 1628 "a warrant was issued to prepare a bill for a privy seal to pay out of the exchequer £14,000 to cancel his debt".

This largesse did not totally satisfy Lord Forfar who grumbled to Secretary Conway that it would have been better if the barony had been in recognition of "the ancient house of Tixall".

Lord Forfar returned as envoy to Spain in 1636, and although the dispute over the restoration of the Palatinate to the new Elector Palatine (the Winter King having died) remained intractable, Lord Forfar gave assistance to twenty-seven lawsuits involving English merchants in Spanish courts. His health failed, and he returned to England in the spring (March–May) 1638, but did not recover and died on 13 August 1639. He was buried in St Mary's Church, Stafford. He was succeeded by his son Walter Aston, 2nd Lord Aston of Forfar.

== Family ==
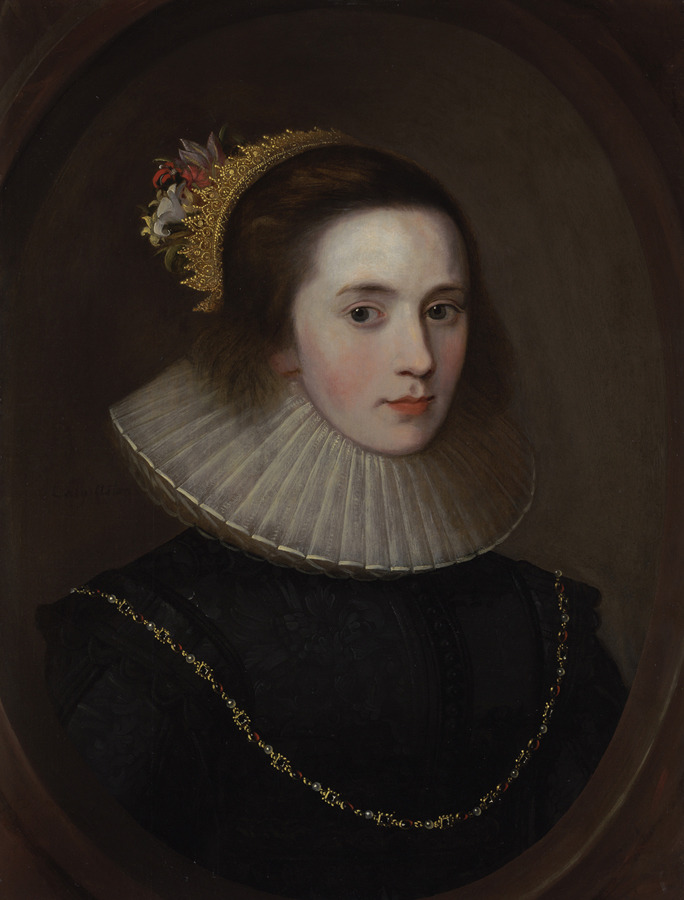
Portrait of Gertrude Sadleir, Lady Aston of Forfar, 17th century, English School

Walter Aston's father died in 1597, leaving him with Attorney-General Sir Edward Coke as his legal guardian. Aston married Anne Barnes in 1600 without his guardian's permission; Coke subsequently had the marriage dissolved.

In 1607 Coke gave permission for Aston to marry Gertrude Sadler (b. c. 1582-7), only daughter of Sir Thomas Sadler of Standon and his second wife Gertrude Markham; Gertrude was the granddaughter of the leading Elizabethan statesman Sir Ralph Sadler. They had several children:

- Walter, who died in infancy.
- Walter, who became the 2nd Lord Aston. The Astons were Roman Catholic, and Walter's son and grandson practised that faith with little attempt at concealment during the worst severities of the Penal Laws, and even during the Popish Plot hysteria.
- Herbert, baptised at Chelsea, 16 January 1614, married Catherine, sister of Sir John Thimbleby, of Ingham, Lincolnshire, and was buried at Colton, in Staffordshire, 9 January 1689, at 75.
- John, who died in infancy.
- Thomas, who died in infancy.
- Gertrude, who died in infancy.
- Honor, baptised at Tottenham, 17 July 1610, died at Vittoria, Spain, during her father's embassy, and was buried at St. Martin's-in-the-Fields, London.
- Frances, baptised at Chelsea, 16 April 1612, married Sir William Peshall, of Canwell in Staffordshire.
- Gertrude, who married Henry, brother of Sir John Thimbleby.
- Constance, an author who married Walter Fowler, of St. Thomas, near Stafford.

== See also ==
- Lord Aston of Forfar

== Notes ==
Baronetage of England
New creation	Baronet (of Tixall); 1611–1639	Succeeded by Walter Aston
Peerage of Scotland
New creation	Lord Aston of Forfar; 1627–1639	Succeeded by Walter Aston
