= Harleian Society =

- Formation: 1869
- Type: Historical society
- Registration no.: 253659
- Legal status: Charity
- Purpose: Heraldic and genealogical study and research
- Headquarters: College of Arms, London, United Kingdom
- Activities: Publications
- Chairman: Sir Thomas Woodcock
- Website: harleian.org.uk

The Harleian Society is a text publication society and registered charity founded in 1869 for the publication of manuscripts of the heraldic visitations of the counties of England and Wales, and other unpublished manuscripts relating to genealogy, armory, and heraldry in its widest sense. Since its inception, the Society has published more than 90 volumes of parish registers, 54 volumes of heraldic visitations, and 70 volumes drawn from other sources.

The Society's publications are available by subscription.

The Society was named after the Harleian Manuscripts, originally accumulated by Robert Harley, 1st Earl of Oxford, and his son Edward Harley, 2nd Earl of Oxford, and now held in the British Library, which include many copies of heraldic visitations.

== See also ==
- College of Arms
