= Robert Clutterbuck =

English historian (1772–1831)

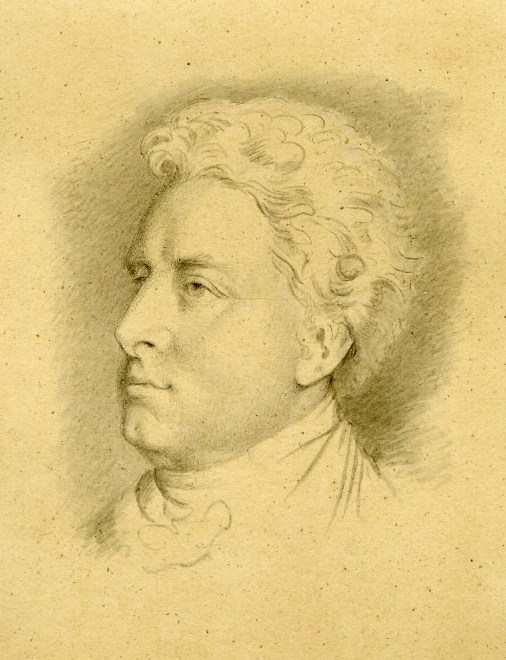
- Robert Clutterbuck, drawing by William Henry Hunt
- Born: 28 June 1772
- Died: 25 May 1831 (aged 58)
- Occupation: Historian
- Known for: Writing The History and Antiquities of the County of Hertford

Robert Clutterbuck (28 June 1772 – 25 May 1831) was an English historian. He spent 18 years writing The History and Antiquities of the County of Hertford.

== Life ==
He was the eldest surviving son of Thomas Clutterbuck, of Watford Hertfordshire by Sarah, daughter of Robert Thurgood of Baldock. He was born at Watford on 28 June 1772 and was sent to Harrow School at an early age. He went to Exeter College, Oxford, as a gentleman commoner. After graduating B.A. in 1794, he entered Lincoln's Inn, intending to make the law his profession, but became more interested in chemistry and painting (in which he took lessons from James Barry. In 1798, he married Marianne, the eldest daughter of Colonel James Capper. After a few years living at the seat of his father's in-law, Cathays, near Cardiff, Glamorganshire, he took possession of his paternal estate at Watford. He continued to live there until his death on 25 May 1831. He was a county magistrate and a Fellow of the Society of Antiquaries.

== Works ==
For 18 years, he worked on a new county history; it appeared under the title The History and Antiquities of the County of Hertford, compiled from the best-printed authorities and original records preserved in public repositories and private collections. Embellished with views of the most curious monuments of antiquity, and illustrated with a map of the County, 3 vols. London, 1815, 1821, 1827. The plates were in, some cases from, his sketches, and he also had the assistance of Edward Blore and other prominent draughtsmen and engravers.

Clutterbuck also published, in 1828, an Account of the Benefactions to the Parish of Watford in the County of Hertford, compiled from Authentic Documents.
