= 1897 New Year Honours =

Appointments by Queen Victoria to various orders and honours

The 1897 New Year Honours were appointments by Queen Victoria to various orders and honours to reward and highlight good works by members of the British Empire. They were published on 1 January 1897.

The recipients of honours are displayed here as they were styled before their new honour, and arranged by honour, with classes (Knight, Knight Grand Cross, etc.) and then divisions (Military, Civil, etc.) as appropriate.

== Order of the Bath ==
=== Knights Grand Cross (GCB) ===
Civil division

- The Right Honourable Sir Frank Cavendish Lascelles, GCMG, Ambassador Extraordinary and Minister Plenipotentiary at Berlin.

=== Knights Commander (KCB) ===
Civil division

- Sir Elwin Mitford Palmer, KCMG, Financial Adviser to His Highness the Khedive of Egypt.
- William Anderson, Esq., CB, Director-General of Ordnance Factories.
- Honorary Colonel the Honourable Wellington Patrick Manvers Chetwynd-Talbot, Serjeant-at-Arms, House of Lords.

=== Companions (CB) ===
Civil division

- Basil Cave, Esq., Consul at Zanzibar.
- William Edward Davidson, Esq., QC, Legal Adviser to the Foreign Office.
- William Conyngham Greene, Esq., British Resident, South African Republic.
- William John Mure, Esq., Legal Secretary to the Lord Advocate for Scotland.
- Richard Thomas Prowse, Esq., Secretary to the Board of Customs.
- Lieutenant-Colonel Lothian Kerr Scott, retired pay, late Royal Engineers.
- Edmond Henry Wodehouse, Esq., Commissioner of Inland Revenue.

== Order of the Star of India ==
=== Knights Commander (KCSI) ===
- John Woodburn, Esq., CSI, Member of the Council of the Governor-General of India.
- His Highness Maharao Raja Raghubir Singh Bahadur, Chief of Bundi.
- Sir Edward Charles Buck, CSI, Secretary to the Government of India in the Department of Revenue and Agriculture.

=== Companions (CSI) ===
- John Nugent, Esq., Member of the Council of the Governor of Bombay.
- Charles Lewis Tupper, Esq., Officiating Second Financial Commissioner of the Punjab.
- Andrew Henderson Leith Fraser, Esq., Commissioner of the Nagpur Division, Central Provinces.

== Order of the Indian Empire ==
=== Knights Grand Commander (GCIE) ===
- Major-General Sir Owen Tudor Burne, KCSI, CIE.

=== Knights Commander (KCIE) ===
- His Highness Maharaja Sawai Ranjor Singh Bahadur, of Ajaigarh.

=== Companions (CIE) ===
- William Earnshaw Cooper, Esq.
- Alexander Anderson, Esq., Indian Civil Service.
- John Eliot, Esq., FRS, Meteorological Reporter to the Government of India.
- Maharaj Rajeshwari Sankara Stibbaiyar, Diwan of Travancore.
- Lieutenant-Colonel Henry Lake Wells, RE.
- Lieutenant Eaton Wallace Petley, RN (Retired)
- Rui Bahadur Pandit Bhag Ram.
- Khan Bahadur Naoroji Pestonji Vakil.

== Order of St Michael and St George ==
=== Knights Commander (KCMG) ===
- The Honourable George Turner, Premier and Treasurer of the Colony of Victoria.

=== Companions (CMG) ===
- Charles Benjamin Mosse, Esq., CB, Deputy Surgeon-General, AMD, Superintending Medical Officer for the Island of Jamaica.
- Captain Robert Lister Bower, Resident of Ibadan.
- Henry Cloete, Esq., lately Acting British Agent in the South African Republic.
