= William Chetwynd-Talbot =

English cricketer, barrister

Personal information
- Full name: William Whitworth Chetwynd Talbot
- Born: 17 January 1814; Ingestre, Staffordshire, England
- Died: 3 July 1888 (aged 74); Hatfield, Hertfordshire, England
- Batting: Unknown
- Role: Wicket-keeper

Domestic team information
- Years: Team
- 1837: Oxford University

Career statistics
Competition	First-class
Matches	1
Runs scored	0
Batting average	0.00
100s/50s	–/–
Top score	0
Catches/stumpings	–/1
- Source: Cricinfo, 6 April 2020

William Whitworth Chetwynd-Talbot (17 January 1814 – 3 July 1888) was an English first-class cricketer and clergyman.

The son of Charles Chetwynd-Talbot, 2nd Earl Talbot he was born in January 1814 at Ingestre Hall, Staffordshire. He was educated at Charterhouse School, before going up to Christ Church, Oxford. While studying at Oxford, he made a single appearance in first-class cricket for Oxford University against the Marylebone Cricket Club at Lord's in 1837. Batting once in the match, he was dismissed without scoring by Sir Frederick Hervey-Bathurst in the Oxford first-innings.

After graduating from Oxford, he took holy orders in the Church of England. Chetwynd-Talbot's first ecclesiastical post was as vicar of Ombersley in Worcestershire from 1838–53. He moved to Bishop's Hatfield in Hertfordshire in 1853, serving as the rector there until his death in July 1888.

He was married to Eleonora Julia Coventry, daughter of the Hon. Rev. William J. Coventry (son of George Coventry, 7th Earl of Coventry) from 1843, with the couple having four children:

- Lt.-Col. Sir Adelbert Cecil KCIE (3 June 1845, d. 28 Dec 1920) married Agnes Clarke, daughter of Rev. Walter Clarke and Mary Broughton (daughter of Rev. Sir Henry Delves Broughton, 8th Baronet, on 28 April 1870 in Hyderabad. They had one son, and three daughters.
- Sub-Lt. William James (20 Sep 1847 - 8 Mar 1872). Unmarried.
- Lt.-Col. Gerald Francis (23 Nov 1848 - 2 Jan 1904) married Henrietta Bradhurst, daughter of Henry M. Bradhurst. They had five sons, and one daughter.
- Gwendaline Talbot

== Ancestry ==
Ancestry of William Chetwynd-Talbot

8. Charles Talbot, 1st Baron Talbot
4. John Chetwynd-Talbot, 1st Earl Talbot
9. Catherine Chetwynd, Baroness Talbot
2. Charles Chetwynd-Talbot, 2nd Earl Talbot
10. Wills Hill, 1st Marquess of Downshire
5. Charlotte Hill, Countess Talbot
11. Margaretta FitzGerald, Marchioness of Downshire
1. William Chetwynd-Talbot
12. Gustavas William Lambart, MP
6. Charles Lambart
13. Lady Thomasine Rochfort
3. Lady Frances Thomasine Lambart, Countess Talbot
14. James Lenox Naper Dutton
7. Frances Dutton
15. Jane Bond
