= Tixall =

Village in Staffordshire, England

Coordinates: 52.80275°N 2.03407°W

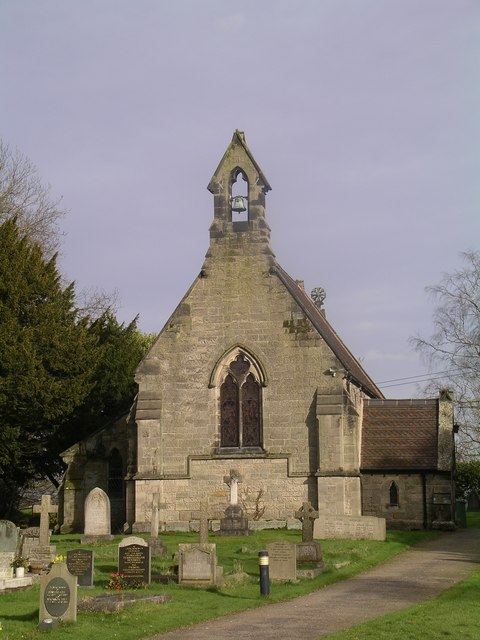

- Location within Staffordshire
- Population: 239 (2011)
- Civil parish: Tixall
- District: Stafford
- Shire county: Staffordshire
- Region: West Midlands
- Country: England
- Sovereign state: United Kingdom
- Post town: STAFFORD
- Postcode district: ST18

Tixall is a small village and civil parish in the Stafford district, in the English county of Staffordshire lying on the western side of the Trent valley between Rugeley and Stone, Staffordshire and roughly 4 miles east of Stafford. The population of the civil parish taken at the 2011 census was 239.

The place-name 'Tixall' is first attested in the Domesday Book of 1086, where it appears as Ticheshale. Deriving from Old English, the name means 'the hollow of the goats'.

It is a fairly elongated village lying to the west of Great Haywood and just north of the sprawling Shugborough estate, the River Sow forming the natural boundary between the two, which joins the Trent on the Shugborough estate a mile or so east of Tixall. The village has benefited substantially from its close proximity to such affluent estates as Shugborough to the south and Sandon Hall and Ingestre Hall to the north, homes of the Earl of Lichfield, the Earl of Harrowby and the Earl of Shrewsbury respectively. Also passing nearby to the east and through the Trent valley is the Staffordshire and Worcestershire Canal, which expands into a body of water called Tixall Wide near to Tixall Gatehouse.

Tixall Hall was the home of the Aston family, who held the title Lord Aston of Forfar. They were staunch Roman Catholics and Tixall was the centre of the local Catholic community. During the Popish Plot Tixall briefly became notorious as the centre of the alleged conspiracy to kill King Charles II, and many victims of the plot such as William Howard, 1st Viscount Stafford were questioned intensively as to their actions while at Tixall.

Tixall is served hourly by Chaserider bus service 828, Monday to Saturday. This was formerly Arriva service 825.

== Local governance ==
The village, and civil parish, of Ingestre is nearby. The civil parishes of Tixall and Ingestre have shared a single parish council of Ingestre with Tixall since 1979.

== Notable buildings ==
Church of St John the Baptist

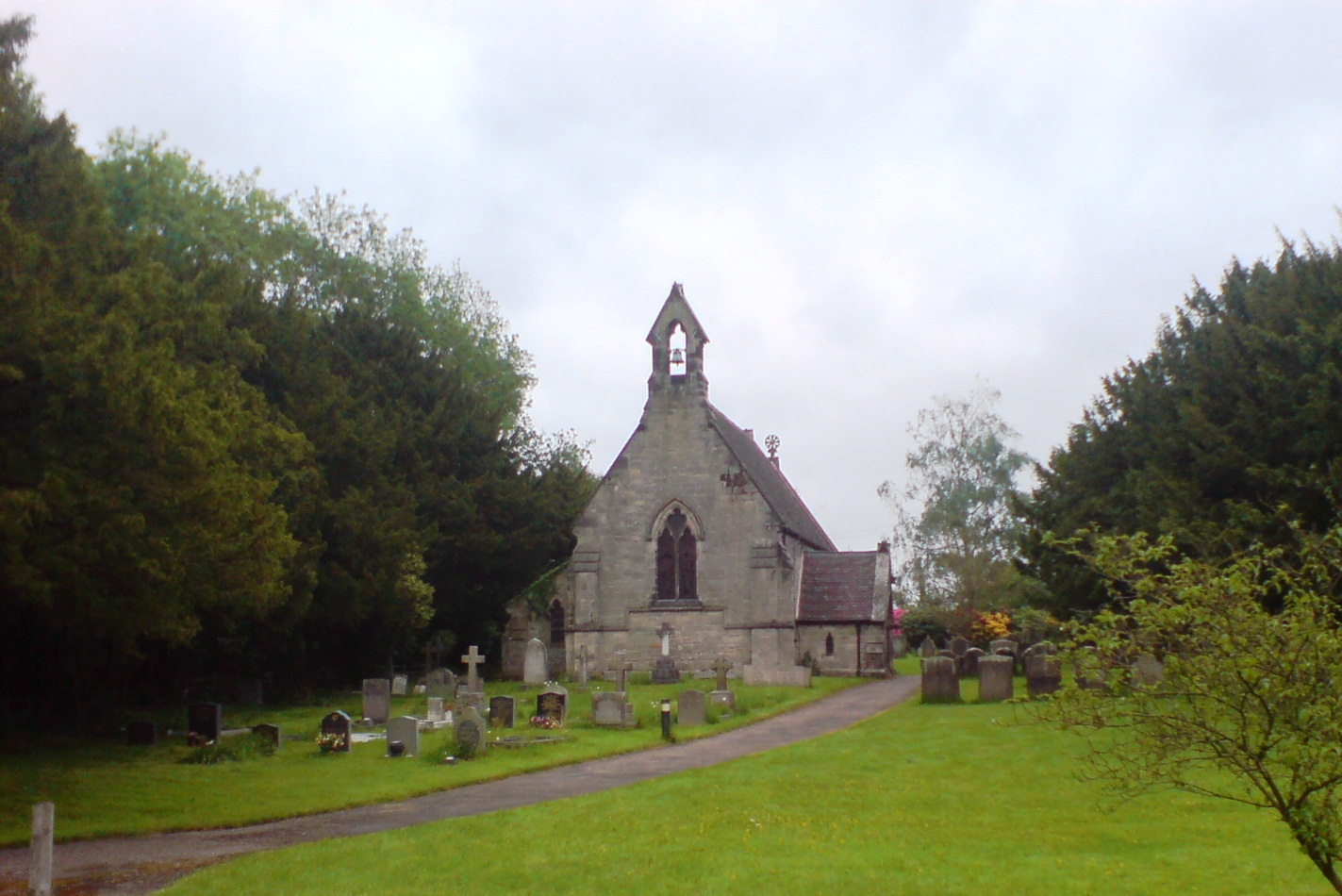
The church of St John the Baptist, Tixall, May 2008

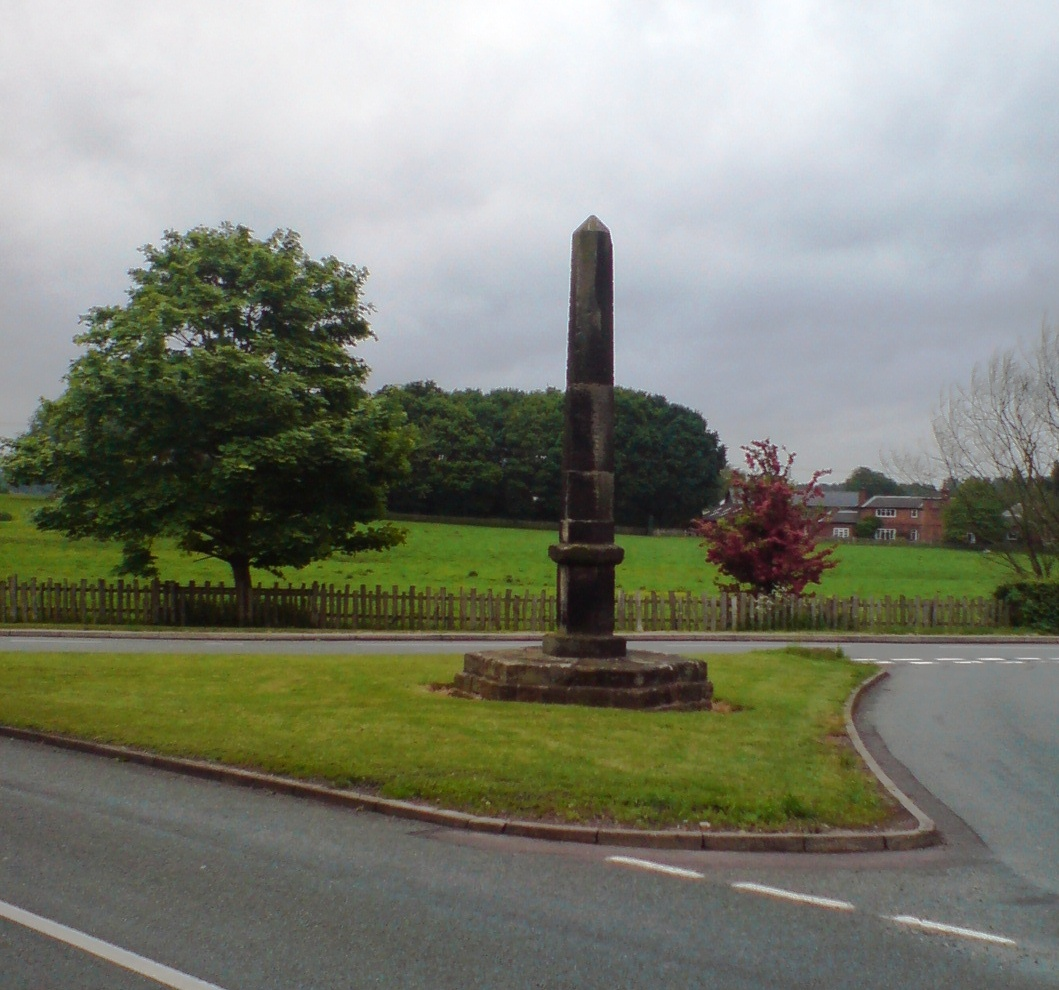
Obelisk at Tixall, May 2008

A free chapel has existed in Tixall since the 12th Century but the present church was built in 1848 by the Hon. John Chetwynd Talbot, son of the 2nd Earl Talbot of Ingestre. It is built of local sandstone with a roof of Staffordshire blue tiles. The floor tiles are by Minton. The oldest grave in the churchyard is reputed to date from 1627.

Tixall Gatehouse

The 16th century 3-storey gatehouse of the now-demolished Tixall Hall, built by the Aston family, is in the care of the Landmark Trust, which offers it as a holiday let.

Obelisk

There is a sandstone obelisk in Tixall dated 1776 sat in a triangle where the road from Stafford meets the road from Milford. It is said to have been placed there by Thomas Clifford, who owned the estate at the time.

== Notable people ==
other than members of the aristocracy referred to above

- Henry Redwood (1823 in Tixall – 1907) a New Zealand farmer, politician and racehorse breeder.
- Francis Webb (1836 Tixall Rectory – 1906) an English railway engineer, responsible for the design and manufacture of locomotives for the London and North Western Railway (LNWR)
- Francis Redwood SM (1839 in Tixall – 1935) the Roman Catholic Archbishop of Wellington, New Zealand.
- Rupert Rogers (1902 in Tixall – 1976) an English cricketer who played a single first-class match for Worcestershire

== See also ==
- Listed buildings in Tixall
