= Patrick Talbot =

British Army officer (1817–1898)

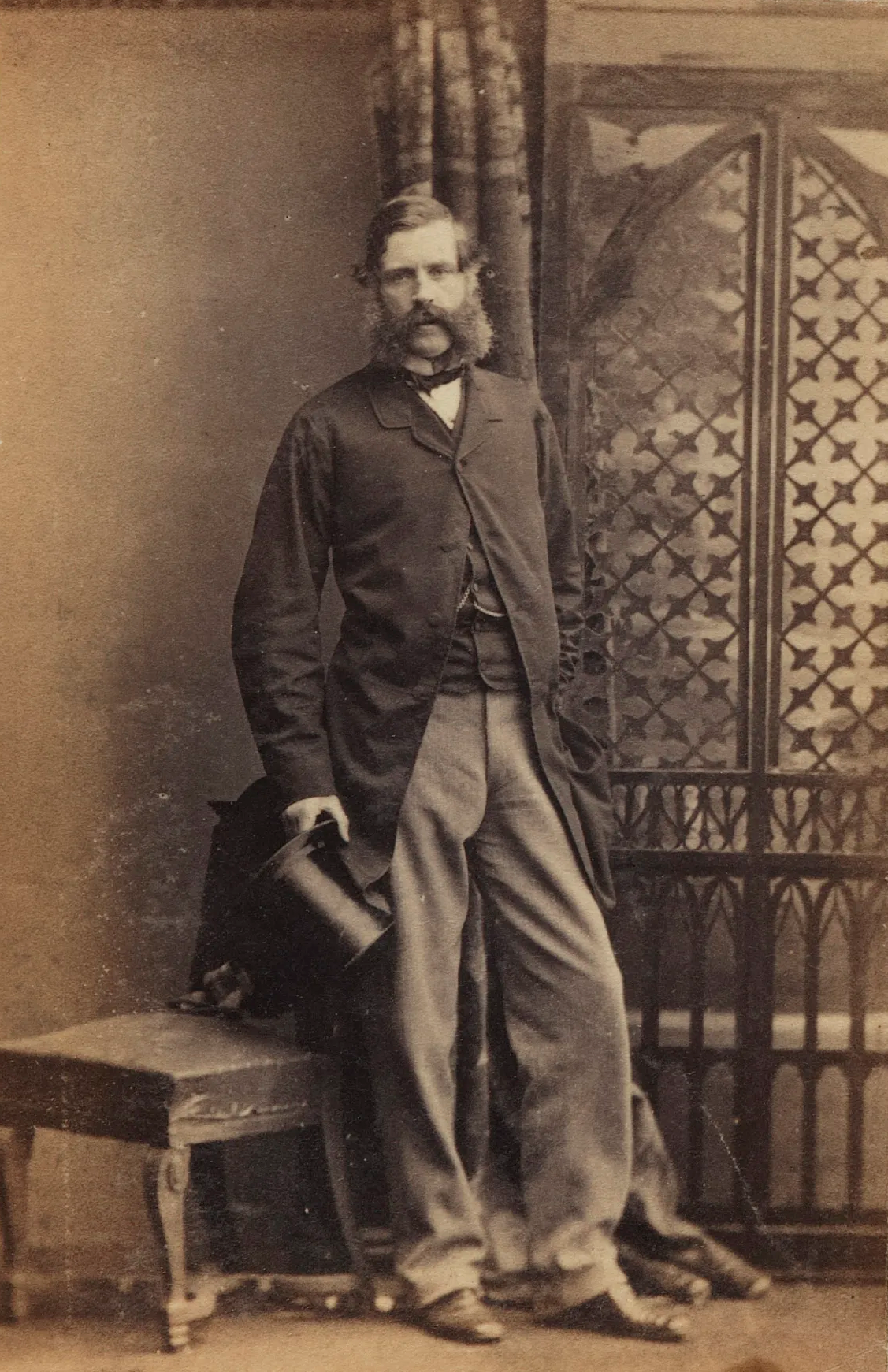
Portrait by Camille Silvy, 1861

Colonel Sir Wellington Patrick Manvers Chetwynd-Talbot KCB (12 December 1817 – 23 September 1898) was a British Army officer who served as Serjeant at Arms of the House of Lords.

== Biography ==
Chetwynd-Talbot was the son of Charles Chetwynd-Talbot, 2nd Earl Talbot and Frances Thomasine Lambart. He was educated at Eton College and Sandhurst, and was commissioned an ensign in the 35th (Royal Sussex) Regiment of Foot on 19 December 1836. He purchased a lieutenancy in the 7th Regiment of Foot on 15 September 1837. On 29 March 1842, he purchased a captaincy in the regiment. From 1844 to 1845, he was comptroller of the household to the Lord Lieutenant of Ireland, Lord Heytesbury.

His father, then Lord Lieutenant of Staffordshire, commissioned him a major in the King's Own (1st Staffordshire) Militia on 4 April 1846. Chetwynd-Talbot was promoted to lieutenant-colonel on 4 March 1853. He was private secretary to his future father-in-law, Lord Derby, while the latter was prime minister in 1852. He commanded the regiment when it was embodied for garrison duty in the Ionian Islands during the Crimean War.

He served as Serjeant at Arms of the House of Lords between 1858 and his death in 1898. He was made a Knight Commander of the Order of the Bath in the 1897 New Year Honours. On 26 April 1873, he resigned his commission as lieutenant-colonel and was appointed honorary colonel of the militia regiment.

On 11 October 1860 he married Lady Emma Charlotte Stanley, daughter of Edward Smith-Stanley, 14th Earl of Derby and Hon. Emma Bootle-Wilbraham. Together they had eight children.

== Ancestry ==
Ancestry of Sir Wellington Patrick Manvers Chetwynd-Talbot

8. John Talbot
4. John Chetwynd-Talbot, 1st Earl Talbot
9. Catherine Chetwynd, Baroness Talbot
2. Charles Chetwynd-Talbot, 2nd Earl Talbot
10. Wills Hill, 1st Marquess of Downshire
5. Charlotte Hill, Countess Talbot
11. Margaretta FitzGerald, Marchioness of Downshire
1. Sir Wellington Patrick Manvers Chetwynd-Talbot
12. Gustavas William Lambart, MP
6. Charles Lambart
13. Lady Thomasine Rochfort
3. Lady Frances Thomasine Lambart, Countess Talbot
14. James Lenox Naper Dutton
7. Frances Dutton
15. Jane Bond
