= 1903 New Year Honours =

Appointments to various orders and honours of the United Kingdom and British India

The 1903 New Year Honours, announced at the time as the Durbar Honours, were appointments to various orders and honours of the United Kingdom and British India. The list was announced on the day of the 1903 Delhi Durbar held to celebrate the succession of King Edward VII and Queen Alexandra as Emperor and Empress of India. The membership of the two Indian Orders were expanded to allow for all the new appointments.

The list was published in The Times on 1 January 1903, and the various honours were gazetted in The London Gazette on 1 January 1903.

A list of appointments to the Royal Victorian Order was announced in the London Gazette on 30 December 1902. These were not included in the Durbar Honours list, as the individuals had already received their decorations in late 1902. They have been added to the end of this page to show the most complete picture of orders awarded.

The recipients of honours are displayed here as they were styled before their new honour, and arranged by honour, with classes (Knight, Knight Grand Cross, etc.) and then divisions (Military, Civil, etc.) as appropriate.

== Knight Bachelor ==
- Montagu Charles Turner, Esq., President, Bengal Chamber of Commerce, and an Additional Member of the Council of the Governor-General for making laws and regulations.
- Lieutenant-Colonel William Earnshaw Cooper, CIE, Commandant, Cawnpore Volunteer Rifles
- Dr. George Watt, CIE, Officer in charge of the Economics and Art Section of the Indian Museum, Calcutta.
- William Ovens Clark, Esq., Indian Civil Service, Chief Judge, Chief Court of the Punjab
- Lieutenant-Colonel James Lewis Walker, CIE, 2nd Punjab Volunteer Rifles
- Mr. Justice James Ackworth Davies, Indian Civil Service, Judge of the High Court of Judicature at Fort St. George
- Harkissandas Narotamdas, Esq., Sheriff of Bombay
- William Godsell, Esq., Auditor, India Office

== The Most Honourable Order of the Bath ==
=== Knight Grand Cross of the Order of the Bath (GCB) ===
Civil Division

- His Highness Asaf Jah Muzaffar-ul-Mamalik, Nizam-ul-Mulk Nizam-ud-Daula Nawab Mir Sir Mahbub Ali Khan Bahadur Fateh Jang, of Hyderabad, GCSI

=== Knights Commander of the Order of the Bath (KCB) ===
Military Division

- Colonel (local Major-General) Charles Comyn Egerton, CB, DSO, ADC
- Colonel Arthur George Hammond, VC, CB, DSO

== Order of the Star of India ==
=== Knights Grand Commander of the Order of the Star of India (GCSI) ===
- The Right Honourable George Francis Hamilton, commonly called Lord George Francis Hamilton
- His Highness Raja Sir Rama Varma, of Cochin, KCSI
- Colonel His Highness Priyadarsi Devanampriya Maharaj-Adhiraj Maharaja Rudra Pratap Singh, Maharaja of Singrauli

=== Knights Commanders of the Order of the Star of India (KCSI) ===
- Denzil Charles Jelf Ibbetson, Esq., CSI, Indian Civil Service, Member of the Council of the Governor-General of India.
- Rear-Admiral Charles Carter Drury, Commander-in-Chief of His Majesty's Naval Forces in the East Indies.
- Henry Martin Winterbotham, Esq, CSI, Indian Civil Service, Member of the Council of the Governor of Fort St. George.
- James Monteath, Esq., CSI, Indian Civil Service, Member of the Council of the Governor of Bombay.
- Lieutenant-Colonel Donald Robertson, CSI, Indian Staff Corps, Resident in Mysore, and Chief Commissioner of Coorg.
- Andrew Henderson Leith Fraser, Esq., CSI, Indian Civil Service, Chief Commissioner of the Central Provinces.
- Hugh Shakespear Barnes, Esq., CSI, Indian Civil Service, Secretary to the Government of India in the Foreign Department.
- Surgeon-General William Roe Hooper, CSI, Indian Medical Service (retired), President of the Medical Board at the India Office.
- Colonel Sir Colin Campbell Scott Moncrieff, KCMG, CSI, Royal Engineers (retired), President of the Indian Irrigation Commission.
- His Highness Raja Kirti Sah, of Tehri, Garhwal, CSI
- Kunwar Ranbir Singh, of Patiala

=== Companions of the Order of the Star of India (CSI) ===
- Sir Edward Fitzgerald Law, KCMG, Member of the Council of the Governor-General of India.
- Charles Stuart Bayley, Esq, Indian Civil Service, Agent to the Governor-General in Central India.
- Edward Townshend Candy, Esq, Indian Civil Service, Puisne Judge of the High Court of Judicature at Bombay.
- Gabriel Stokes, Esq., Indian Civil Service, Chief Secretary to the Government of Madras and an additional Member of the Council of the Governor of Fort St. George for making Laws and Regulations.
- Major-General Trevor Bruce Tyler, Royal Artillery, Inspector-General of Artillery in India.
- Harvey Adamson, Esq., Indian Civil Service, Judicial Commissioner of Upper Burma.
- William Henry Lockington Impey, Esq, Indian Civil Service, Officiating Chief Secretary to the Government of the United Provinces, and a Member of the Council of the Lieutenant-Governor of the United Provinces for making Laws and Regulations.
- William Charles Macpherson, Esq, Indian Civil Service, Officiating Secretary to the Government of Bengal, General and Revenue Departments, and a Member of the Council of the Lieutenant-Governor of Bengal for making Laws and Regulations.
- Colonel St George Corbet Gore, Royal Engineers, Surveyor-General of India.
- Lieutenant-Colonel James Alexander Lawrence Montgomery, Indian Staff Corps, Commissioner of the Rawalpindi Division of the Punjab.
- Reginald Henry Craddock, Esq., Indian Civil Service, Commissioner of the Jubbulpore Division of the Central Provinces.
- Colonel Henry Doveton Hutchinson, Indian Staff Corps, Assistant Military Secretary (for Indian Affairs) at the War Office.
- Major Hugh Daly, CIE, Indian Staff Corps, Deputy Secretary to the Government of India in the Foreign Department.
- Raja Ban Bihari Kapur, of Burdwan.
- Nawab Mumtaz-ud-Daula Muhammad Faiyaz Ali Khan, of Pahasu, lately a Member of the Council of the Lieutenant-Governor of the United Provinces for making Laws and Regulations.
- Sardar Badan Singh, of Malaudh, in the Ludhiana District of the Punjab.

It had been the King′s intention to appoint Raja Bije Sen Bahadur of Mandi to be a Knight Commander of the Order of the Star of India, had he not died in December 1902.

== Order of the Indian Empire ==
=== Knights Grand Commander of the Order of the indian Empire (GCIE) ===
- His Highness Sri Padmanabha Dasa Vanji Sir Bala Rama Varma Kulashekhara Kiritapati Mani Sultan Maharaja Raja Rama Raja Bahadur Shamsher Jang, of Travancore, GCSI
- His Highness Farzand-i-Arjumand Akidat-Paiwand Daulat-i-Inglishia Barar Bans Sarmur Raja-i-Rajagan Raja Sir Hira Singh Malwandar Bahadur, of Nabha, GCSI

It had been the King′s intention to appoint Sir John Woodburn, KCSI to be a Knight Grand Commander of the Order of the Indian Empire, had he not died in November 1902.

=== Knights Commander of the Order of the indian Empire (KCIE) ===
- Sir Lawrence Hugh Jenkins, Chief Justice of the High Court of Judicature at Bombay.
- Herbert Thirkell White, Esq, CIE, Indian Civil Service, Chief Judge of the Chief Court of Lower Burma.
- Charles Lewis Tupper, Esq, CSI, Indian Civil Service, Financial Commissioner of the Punjab, and a Member of the Council of the Lieutenant-Governor of the Punjab for making Laws and Regulations.
- Surgeon-General Benjamin Franklin, CIE, Indian Medical Service, Honorary Physician to the King, Director-General, Indian Medical Service, and Sanitary Commissioner with the Government of India.
- Frederick Augustus Nicholson, Esq, CIE, Indian Civil Service, First Member of the Board of Revenue, Madras, and an Additional Member of the Council of the Governor of Fort St George for making Laws and Regulations.
- Arthur Upton Fanshawe, Esq, CSI, Indian Civil Service, Director-General of the Post Office of India.
- Walter Roper Lawrence, Esq, CIE, Indian Civil Service (retired), Private Secretary to His Excellency the Viceroy of India.
- John Eliot, Esq, CIE, Meteorological Reporter to the Government of India, and Director-General of Indian Observatories.
- Raja Dhiraj Nahar Singh, of Shahpura, in Rajputana.
- Gangadhar Rao Ganesh, alias Bala Sahib Patwar-Dhan, Chief of Miraj (Senior Branch), in the Southern Mahratta Country.
- Sardar Ghaus Bakhsh, Raisani, the Premier Chief of the Sarawans, Baluchistan.
- Maharaja Harballabh Narayan Singh Bahadur, of Sonbursa, Bengal, CIE
- Maharaja Peshkar Kishn Parshad, Minister to His Highness the Nizam of Hyderabad.
- Puma Narasingharao Krishna Murti, CIE, Dewan of Mysore.
- Maharaja Gode Narayana Gajapati Rao, of Vizagapatam, CIE

=== Companions of the Order of the indian Empire (CIE) ===
- Colonel Ernest De Brath, Indian Staff Corps, Joint Secretary to the Government of India in the Military Department.
- Pratul Chandar Chattarji, Rai Bahadur, Judge of the Chief Court of the Punjab.
- Frederick Gurr Maclean, Esq, Director-General of Telegraphs in India.
- Walter Bernard de Winton, Esq, Chief Engineer and Secretary to the Government of Madras in the Public Works Department.
- Colonel Trevredyn Rashleigh Wynne, Agent and Chief Engineer of the Bengal-Nagpur Railway, Honorary Aide-de-Camp to the Viceroy of India, and Commandant of the Bengal-Nagpur Railway Volunteer Rifle Corps.
- Algernon Elliott, Esq, Officiating Commissioner of the Hyderabad Assigned Districts.
- Major (temporary Lieutenant-Colonel) Charles Arnold Kemball, Indian Staff Corps, Officiating Political Resident in the Persian Gulf.
- Herbert William Cameron Carnduff, Esq, Indian Civil Service. Deputy Secretary to the Government of India in the Legislative Department.
- Lieutenant-Colonel William Loch, General List Infantry, Principal of Mayo College, at Ajmer.
- Lieutenant-Colonel Gerald Bomford, MD, Indian Medical Service, Principal of the Medical College, Calcutta.
- Lieutenant-Colonel John Hodding, VD, Commandant of the Behar Light Horse.
- Edward Giles, Esq, Director of Public Instruction, Bombay.
- Henry King Beauchamp, Esq, Sheriff of Madras, Editor of the " Madras Mail."
- Harjibhai Manekji Rustamji, Esq, Sheriff of Calcutta.
- Havilland Le Mesurier, Esq, Indian Civil Service, lately Magistrate and Collector of Patna, and Chairman of the Patna Municipality.
- Robert Nathan, Esq, Indian Civil Service, late Under Secretary to the Government of India in the Home Department, and Secretary to the Indian Universities Commission.
- Major Alfred William Alcock, MB, FRS, Indian Medical Service, Superintendent of the Indian Museum.
- Arthur Hill, Esq, Executive Engineer. 1st Grade, Bombay Presidency.
- Douglas Donald, Esq, Commandant of the Border Military Police and Saniana Rifles, Kohat.
- Jagadish Chandra Bose, Professor of the Presidency College at Calcutta.
- Nawab Muhammad Sharif Khan, Khan of Dir.
- Mehtar Shuja-ul-Mulk of Chitral
- Mir Muhammad Nazim Khan, Mir of Hunza.
- Raja Sikandar Khan, of Nagar.
- William Dickson Cruickshank, Esq, Secretary and Treasurer of the Bank of Bengal.
- Thomas Jewell Bennett, Esq, of the "Times of India", Bombay.
- John O'Brien Saunders, Esq, Proprietor and Editor of the "Englishman", Calcutta.
- Henry Wenden, Esq, Agent of the Great Indian Peninsula Railway.
- Charles Henry Wilson, Esq, Manager of the Hong Kong and Shanghai Banking Corporation, and Vice-President of the Rangoon Municipal Committee.
- Khan Bahadur Maulvi Khuda Bakhsh, of Patna.
- Rao Bahadur Shyam Sundar Lai, Dewan of Kishangarh in Rajputana.
- Rao Bahadur Muushi Balmakund Das, Dewan Bahadur, Member of the Alwar State Council.
- Robert Herriot Henderson, Esq, Superintendent of the Tarrapur Tea Company's Gardens in the Cachar District, Assam.
- Nawab Hafiz Muhammad Abdulla Khan, Alizai, of Dera Ismail Khan, Honorary Commandant of the 15th Bengal Cavalry.
- Kun Kyi, Sawbwa of Mong Nai, in the Southern Shan States.
- Mir Mehrulla Khan, Raisani, Nazim of Mekran, Baluchistan.
- Nawab Fateh Ali Khari, Kaziltash, of Lahore.
- Mahamahopadhyaya Pandit Gangu Dhar Shastri, professor of the Sanskrit College at Benares.
- Faridoouji Jamshedji. Esq, Private Secretary to His Highness the Nizam's Minister at Hyderabad.
- Charles Henry West, Esq, Personal Assistant to the Adjutant-General in India.

It had been the King′s intention to confer a Companionship of the Order of the Indian Empire on Mr. Harry Charles Hill, for his service in the Forest department in India, had he also not died in November 1902.

== Kaisar-i-Hind Medal ==
- Her Excellency The Lady Curzon of Kedleston, CI.
- The Reverend Samuel Scott Allmutt, MA, Cambridge Mission, Delhi.
- Albert Frederick Ashton, Esq., Deputy Commissioner, Northern India Salt Revenue Department.
- Lieutenant-Colonel Charles Hutton Dawson, Indian Staff Corps, Political Superintendent, Hilly Tracts, Mewar.
- Captain Alain C. July de Lotbinière, Royal Engineers, Deputy Chief Engineer in Mysore.
- James Douglas, Esq., of Bombay.
- The Reverend J. A. Graham, MA, Kalimpong, Bengal.
- Pandit Jwála Prasád, Magistrate and Collector of Jalaun, United Provinces.
- Clarence Kirkpatrick, Esq., Barrister-at-Law, Member of the Municipal Committee of Delhi.
- Lieutenant-Colonel Robert William Steele Lyons, MD, Indian Medical Service, Civil Surgeon and Superintendent, Lunatic Asylum, Dharwar, Bombay Presidency.
- Merwanjee Cowasjee, Esq., Municipal Commissioner and Honorar Magistrate, Rangoon.
- John Nisbet, Esq., lately a Conservator of Forests in Burma.
- Major David Semple, MD, RAMC, Director of the Pasteur Institute, Kasauli.
- The Reverend J. D. W. Sewell, S.J., Manager of St. Joseph′s College, Trichinopoly, Madras Presidency.
- The Reverend David Whitton, Principal of the Hislop College, Nagpur, Central Provinces.

== Honorary military ranks and Salutes ==
Honorary Military ranks

- His Highness Raja Sir Hira Sing Bahadur, GCSI, of Nabha, is granted the honorary rank of Colonel in the Army.
- His Highness Maharao Sir Umaid Singh Bahadur, KCSI, of Kota, is granted the honorary rank of Major in the Army.

Salutes

The King has been graciously pleased on the occasion of the Coronation Durbar to grant the following salutes:

- To Nawab Sidi Sir Ahmad Khan, KCIE, of Janjira, the increase of his dynastic salute from nine to eleven guns.
- To Sankar Rao Chimnaji, Pant Sachir of Bhor, the grant of a personal salute of nine guns.
- To Maharana Jaswantsinghji Harisinghji of Danta, the grant of a personal salute of nine guns.
- To Sir Amid-ud-in Ahmad Khan Bahadur, KCIE, Nawab of Loharu, the grant of a personal salute of nine guns.
- To the Sawbwa of Kengtung, the grant of a permanent salute of eleven guns.
- To the Sawbwa of Mongnai, the grant of a permanent salute of nine guns.
- To the Sawbwa of Hsipaw, the grant of a permanent salute of nine guns.

== Royal Victorian Order ==
=== Knight Grand Cross of the Royal Victorian Order (GCVO) ===
Honorary

- His Excellency the Marquis de Soveral, GCMG, Envoy Extraordinary and Minister Plenipotentiary of His Majesty the King of Portugal at the Court of St. James's.

=== Knight Commander of the Royal Victorian Order (KCVO) ===
- Major-General Hugh Richard, Viscount Downe, CVO, CB, CIE (received the decoration at Buckingham Palace on 18 December 1902).
- Sir John Williams, Bart., M.D. (received the decoration during a visit to King Edward VII at Sandringham House on 29 December 1902)

Honorary

- Rear-Admiral Guilherme Augusto de Biito Capello, Aide-de-Camp to His Majesty the King of Portugal.

=== Commander of the Royal Victorian Order (CVO) ===
Honorary

- Dr. Friedrich Ilberg, MVO, Physician to His Imperial Majesty the German Emperor and King of Prussia.

=== Member of the Royal Victorian Order, 4th class (MVO) ===
- Major David Phelips Chapman, late Cheshire Regiment, Director of Accounts Department, Ministry of the Interior, Egypt.
- Major James Henry L'Estrange Johnstone, Royal Engineers, President of the Egyptian Railway Administration.
- Captain George Edward Wickham Legg, Secretary of the Soldiers' and Sailors' Families' Association (received the decoration at Buckingham Palace on 18 December 1902).
- Stapleton Charles Cotton, Esq., on his retirement from the Honourable Corps of Gentlemen-at-Arms (received the decoration at Buckingham Palace on 18 December 1902).

Honorary

- Geheimer Hofrathein Julius Taegen, of the German Imperial Foreign Service
