= Listed buildings in Tixall =

Tixall is a civil parish in the Borough of Stafford, Staffordshire, England. It contains 15 listed buildings that are recorded in the National Heritage List for England. Of these, one is listed at Grade I, the highest of the three grades, and the others are at Grade II, the lowest grade. The parish includes the village of Tixall and the surrounding area. The listed buildings include a gatehouse and stabling associated with a country house that has been demolished, a building moved from Ingestre, a farmhouse and farm buildings, an obelisk, two bridges, a lodge, a house, a church, two memorial benches, and a telephone kiosk.

== Key ==
Grade	Criteria
I	Buildings of exceptional interest, sometimes considered to be internationally important
II	Buildings of national importance and special interest

== Buildings ==
Name and location	Photograph	Date	Notes	Grade
Outbuildings, St Thomas' Farm; 52.80406°N 2.07596°W	—	Medieval	There are two parallel ranges that were refashioned in the 16th century and have since been repaired. They are in stone with repairs in brick, and have tile roofs. The outbuildings have two storeys, and contain remains of medieval and Tudor mullioned windows and a Tudor arch.	II
The Gatehouse; 52.80408°N 2.03230°W		c. 1575	The gatehouse to a former hall, which has been demolished, is in stone. It has three storeys, three bays, and a rectangular plan. At each of the four corners is a polygonal turret with an ogee cap. The central archway has carvings of soldiers in the spandrels on one side, and of winged females on the other. The central bay is flanked by columns, in Roman Doric style in the ground storey, Ionic style in the middle storey, and Corinthian style on the top storey. The windows are mullioned and transomed, above the archway is a canted bay window in each of the upper storeys, and at the top is a balustraded parapet.	I
Dairy Bridge; 52.80363°N 2.03423°W	—	18th century (probable)	The road bridge is in stone, and consists of a small Gothic arch. There are moulded pilasters on both sides, and a heavily coped parapet, and on the east side is an inscription in Latin.	II
St Thomas' Farmhouse; 52.80385°N 2.07503°W	—	18th century	The farmhouse incorporates material, possibly medieval, from an earlier priory. It is in brick with some stone, on a moulded plinth on the south side, with coved eaves, and a tile roof. There are two storeys and an attic, and seven bays. The doorway has a bracketed hood, and the windows are casements, some with transoms.	II
The Temple or Rotunda; 52.80172°N 2.03275°W		Mid 18th century	The building, which has been moved to its present site from Ingestre, is in stone and has an octagonal plan. It consists of Tuscan columns carrying a decorative entablature and a dome.	II
Obelisk; 52.80129°N 2.03643°W		1770	The obelisk stands on a step in a triangle at a road junction. It is in sandstone and has an hexagonal plan. The obelisk is inscribed with the distance in miles to Stafford.	II
Footbridge, Shugborough Park; 52.79865°N 2.01874°W		Late 18th century (probable)	The footbridge crosses a stream in the grounds of Shugborough Hall, which marks the boundary of the parishes of Tixall and Colwich. It is in metal, and consists of three short spans with elaborate open-work parapets. At each end are four openwork piers with decorative caps.	II
Bottle Lodge; 52.80576°N 2.02502°W		1807	The lodge is in stone with brick internal walls, a moulded cornice, and an ogee arched roof with a polygonal chimney on the apex. It has an octagonal plan and a single cell. On the southwest side is a doorway with a moulded surround, a Tudor arch, and sunken spandrels. Above and flanking the doorway are two-light mullioned windows, and at the rear are smaller windows.	II
Farm buildings, Tixall Farm; 52.80625°N 2.02460°W		c. 1830	The farm buildings are in red brick with brick dressings and hipped slate roofs. The ranges form a quadrilateral plan around the farmyard. Stretching along the road is a range with two storeys and 17 bays, the middle three bays slightly projecting and containing a segmental carriage arch. Above this is a square tower with corner turrets with pyramidal caps and containing a dovecote, and on the top is an ornate wooden cupola with a weathervane. In the flanking ranges are casement windows and pitching holes above. The other ranges include a hay barn with five segmental arches and a continuous ventilator, cowsheds with round-headed entrances, a threshing barn and a stable range with a segmental arch and lofts.	II
Stabling at Tixall; 52.80564°N 2.03242°W		Early 19th century	The hall has been demolished, but the stables have remained. They are in stone with a slate roof, and have a single storey and a semicircular plan. There are three taller two-storey embattled pavilions, one in the centre, and the others at the ends. The central pavilion contains a three-bay Tudor arch, and the windows in the stables are mullioned.	II
Tixall Cottage; 52.80222°N 2.03625°W	—	Early 19th century (probable)	The house is in colourwashed brick with a tile roof, and is in Regency style. There are two storeys and five bays. The doorway has a rectangular fanlight and a bracketed hood, and the windows are casements.	II
St John the Baptist's Church; 52.80306°N 2.03273°W		1849	The church is built in local sandstone, it has a roof of red and grey tiles, and is in Decorated style. It consists of a nave, a north aisle, a south porch, and a chancel. On the west gable end is a bellcote. The windows are pointed with trefoil heads.	II
Stone Seat east of Brancote Farm; 52.80122°N 2.04762°W	—	c. 1860	A memorial bench in red sandstone, it has a moulded seat on a riser and large scrolled bench ends. There is an inscription on the riser.	II
Stone Seat north-northwest of Brancote Farm; 52.80477°N 2.05806°W	—	c. 1860	A memorial bench in red sandstone, it has a moulded seat on a riser and large scrolled bench ends. There is an inscription on the riser.	II
Telephone kiosk 52.80319°N 2.03419°W		1935	A K6 telephone kiosk, designed by Giles Gilbert Scott. It is in cast iron and has a square plan and a saucer-domed roof. There are low relief crowns in the top panels, and margin-light glazing to the windows and the door.	II
