= Listed buildings in Ingestre =

Ingestre is a civil parish in the Borough of Stafford, Staffordshire, England. It contains nine listed buildings that are recorded in the National Heritage List for England. Of these, one is listed at Grade I, the highest of the three grades, one is at Grade II*, the middle grade, and the others are at Grade III, the lowest grade. The parish contains the village of Ingestre and the surrounding area. The parish is focused around Ingestre Hall, a country house and the adjoining St Mary's Church, which are both listed, together with associated structures including a farmhouse and farm buildings. The only listed building in the village is a telephone kiosk.

== Key ==
Grade	Criteria
I	Buildings of exceptional interest, sometimes considered to be internationally important
II*	Particularly important buildings of more than special interest
II	Buildings of national importance and special interest

== Buildings ==
Name and location	Photograph	Date	Notes	Grade
Ingestre Hall; 52.81972°N 2.03703°W		Early 17th century	A country house, it was altered by John Nash in about 1810, and largely rebuilt following a fire in 1882. The house is in Jacobean style, and is built in brick with stone dressings. It has two storeys and a basement, and a symmetrical south front of nine bays, with balustrades along the top. The outer bays are wider, they project, and contain two-storey bow windows with a shaped gable above. The central bay also projects, and contains a doorway with paired Doric columns and a round arch, above which are pilasters. Over this is a canted bay window and a cupola. The windows are mullioned and transomed. The north front contains a giant portico, and more bow windows and shaped gables.	II*
St Mary's Church; 52.81969°N 2.03606°W		1676	The church, which is attributed to Sir Christopher Wren, is in stone with quoins, and consists of a nave with a clerestory, north and south aisles, a chancel, a vestry that was added in 1908, and a west tower. At the west end is a round-headed doorway with Tuscan three-quarter columns and a pediment, and above it is a shield with garlands. The tower has a clock face on the west front, also with garlands, and at the top is a balustrade and four urns. Along the clerestory are round windows, and the other windows have round heads with keystones, with three stepped windows at the east end.	I
Old stables, Ingestre Hall; 52.81936°N 2.03590°W		Late 17th century	The stables are in brick, with rusticated stone quoins and a tile roof. There are two storeys, the centre is gabled, and flanked by three bays on each side. On the west side is a round-headed archway, now blocked, and the windows are casements.	II
The Pavilion, Ingestre Park; 52.81945°N 2.04348°W		Mid 18th century	Only the façade of the building remains. It is in rusticated stone, and is pedimented. The centre is recessed behind four ionic columns.	II
Orangery, Ingestre Hall; 52.82090°N 2.03551°W	—	c. 1770	The orangery is in brick, the side walls are clad in limestone, and the roofs are glazed. There is a single storey, nine bays and flanking three-bay pavilions, all on three steps. The bays are glazed, and between them are Doric pilasters. The pavilions have pediments, and each has a doorway with a moulded surround and console brackets carrying a flat hood. Flanking the doorway are niches, above a frieze, panels, and a dentilled eaves cornice, and at the rear is a portico.	II
Home Farmhouse; 52.82059°N 2.03269°W	—	c. 1820	The farmhouse is in red brick, and has a shallow stuccoed frieze, overhanging eaves, and a hipped slate roof. There are two storeys, a double depth plan, a front of three bays, and flanking wings. The central doorway has pilasters, a semicircular fanlight, and an open pediment, and the windows are sashes.	II
Farm buildings, Home Farm; 52.82074°N 2.03222°W		c. 1840	The farm buildings are in red brick with dentilled eaves courses and hipped slate roofs, the ranges forming an E-shaped plan. On the east side is a long barn with a blind arcade and blocked pitching holes, and on the north side is a shelter-shed containing elliptical-arched openings. On the central range is a ventilator, and to the south are stables with a loft, and a cartshed range with elliptical-arched doorways.	II
New stables, Ingestre Hall; 52.81928°N 2.03344°W		19th century	The stables are in brick with stone dressings and slate roofs, and form four ranges round a courtyard. Above the entrance is a tower with a cupola that has a domed top. There is another cupola at the opposite end, where there is also a porte-cochère and blind arcading. The windows have stone mullions, and other features include shaped gables and balustrades.	II
Telephone kiosk 52.81783°N 2.02738°W	—	1935	A K6 telephone kiosk, designed by Giles Gilbert Scott. It is in cast iron and has a square plan and a saucer-domed roof. There are low relief crowns in the top panels, and margin-light glazing to the windows and the door.	II
