= Umed Singh II =

Maharaja of Kotah from 1889–1940

Sir Umed Singh II GCSI GCIE GBE
- HH Maharao Raja
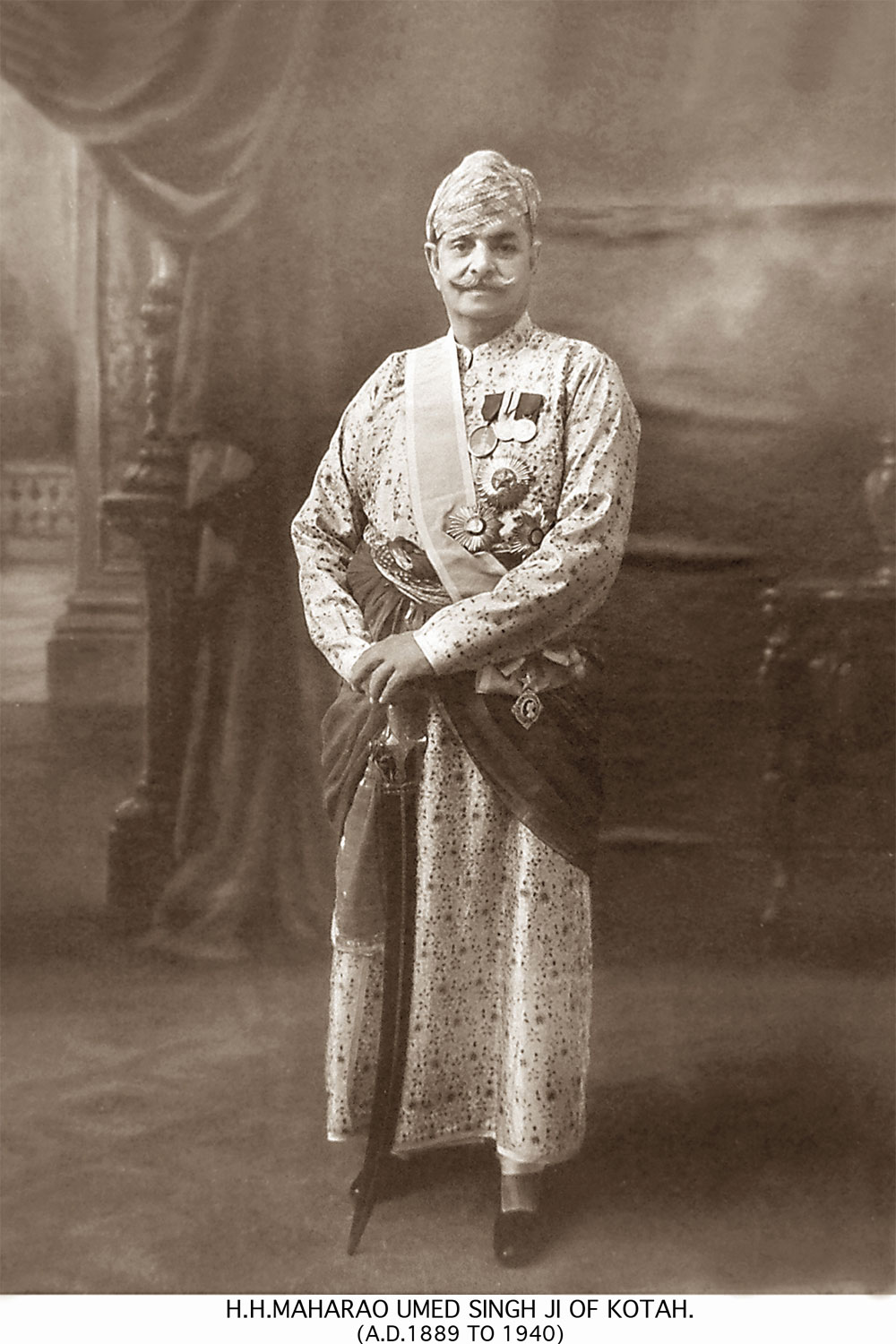

Maharao of Kotah
- Reign: 1889–1940
- Predecessor: Shatru Sal Singh II
- Successor: Bhim Singh II
- Born: 15 September 1873
- Died: 27 December 1940 (aged 67)
- Spouse: (Sisodiniji) Ranawatji Nand Kanwarji d.of HH Maharana Fateh Singh of Udaipur State Jadejiji Kesar Kanwarji d.of HH Maharao Khengarji III of Kutch State Kachwahiji (Rajawatji) Gulab Kanwarji sister of Raj Thakuran Sawai Singh of Isarda in Jaipur State
- Issue: Bhim Singh II
- House: Madhani Hada-Chauhan
- Father: Maharaj Chagan Singh of Kotra in Kota State
- Mother: Chandrawatji (Sisodiniji) Chaman Kanwarji d.of Rao Saheb Singh of Dhabla in Malwa

Colonel HH Maharajadhiraj Shri Maharaja Mahim Mahendra Maharao Raja Sir Umaid Singh II (15 September 1873 – 27 December 1940) was the 18th Hada Chauhan ruler of the Princely State of Kotah from the year 1889 to 1940.

Although never appointed to any official post within the imperial British Raj, Sir Umaid Singh II served as an advisor to leading government officials, and was much sought after for his stately advice. He sent his state troops to fight in both the First World War and the Second World War.

== Life ==
The great-great-great-great-great-grandson of Rao Kishor Singh I, a Raja of Kota, Sir Umed Singhji was adopted at a young age by HH Maharao Raja Shatru Sal Singh II the then childless ruler of the state. Following his death in the year 1889, Umed Singhji (Udai Singh, as he was then named) embarked on a long and distinguished career as a soldier and statesman, being educated at Mayo College in Ajmer.

He received the honorary rank of Major in the Army in the 1903 Durbar Honours on 1 January 1903.

He died in 1940, aged 67, after an illustrious reign of 52 years, and was succeeded by his only son, Maharao Raja Sir Bhim Singhji II.

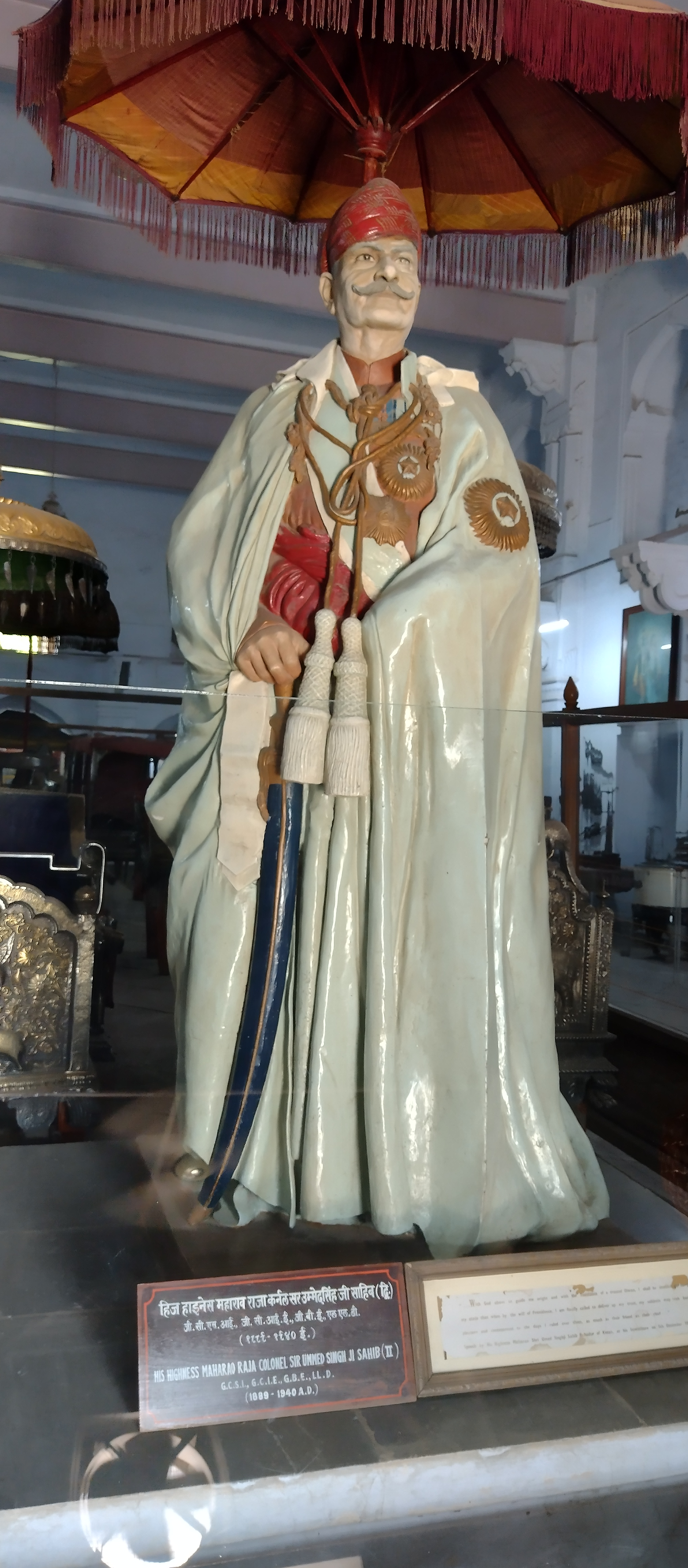
Photo of Maharao Ummed singh II, Kotah statue placed at Garh Palace

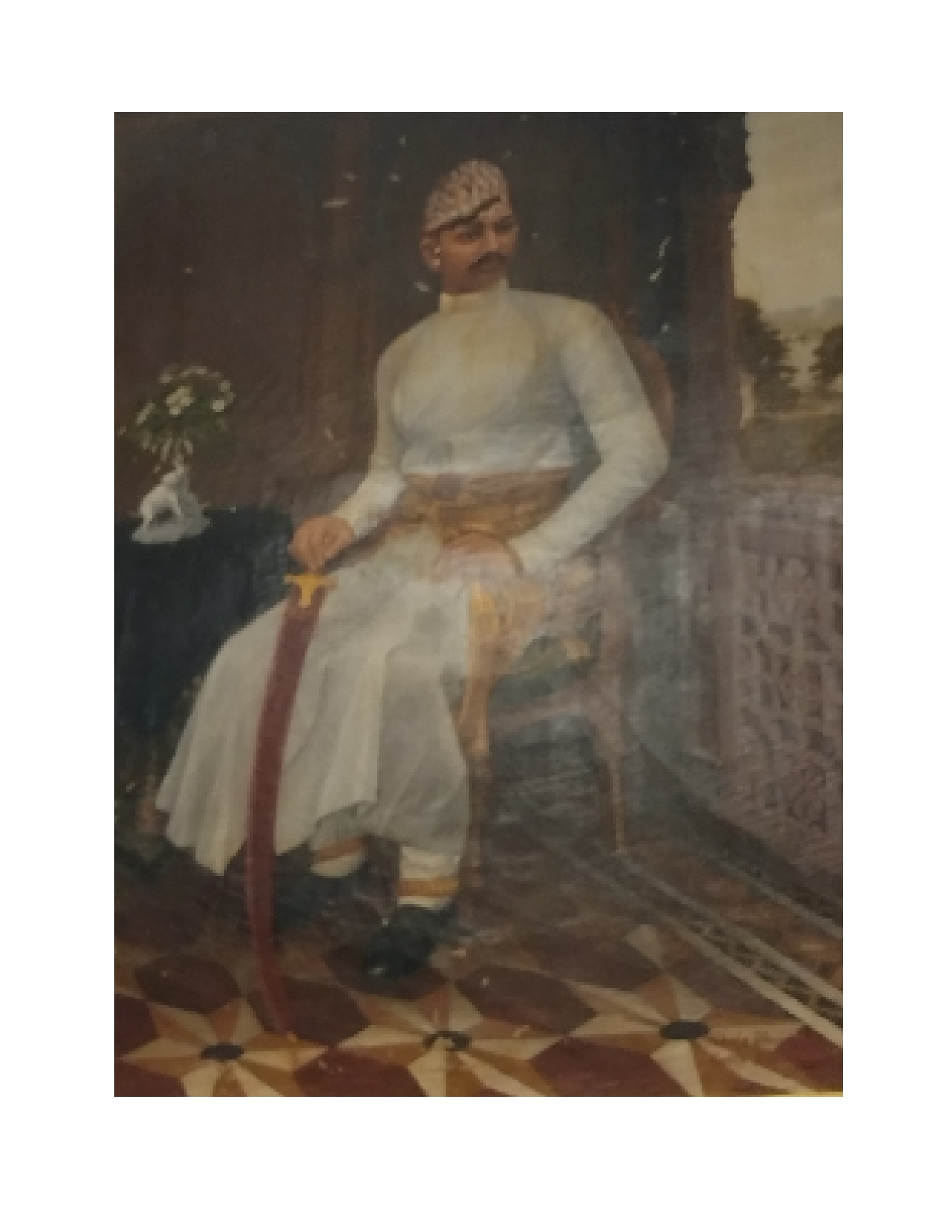
Maharao Umed Singh II of Kotah in a portrait

== Titles ==
- 1873–1889: Kunwar Sri Umaid Singh
- 1889–1900: His Highness Maharajadhiraj Maharaja Mahimahendra Maharao Raja Shri Umed Singh II Sahib Bahadur, Maharao Raja of Kotah
- 1900–1903: His Highness Maharajadhiraj Maharaja Mahimahendra Maharao Raja Shri Sir Umed Singh II Sahib Bahadur, Maharao Raja of Kotah, KCSI
- 1903–1907: Major His Highness Maharajadhiraj Maharaja Mahimahendra Maharao Raja Shri Sir Umed Singh II Sahib Bahadur, Maharao Raja of Kotah, KCSI
- 1907–1911: Major His Highness Maharajadhiraj Maharaja Mahimahendra Maharao Raja Shri Sir Umed Singh II Sahib Bahadur, Maharao Raja of Kotah, GCIE, KCSI
- 1911–1915: Major His Highness Maharajadhiraj Maharaja Mahimahendra Maharao Raja Shri Sir Umed Singh II Sahib Bahadur, Maharao Raja of Kotah, GCSI, GCIE
- 1915–1918: Lieutenant-Colonel His Highness Maharajadhiraj Maharaja Mahimahendra Maharao Raja Shri Sir Umed Singh II Sahib Bahadur, Maharao Raja of Kotah, GCSI, GCIE
- 1918–1939: Lieutenant-Colonel His Highness Maharajadhiraj Maharaja Mahimahendra Maharao Raja Shri Sir Umed Singh II Sahib Bahadur, Maharao Raja of Kotah, GCSI, GCIE, GBE
- 1939–1940: Colonel His Highness Maharajadhiraj Maharaja Mahimahendra Maharao Raja Shri Sir Umed Singh II Sahib Bahadur, Maharao Raja of Kotah, GCSI, GCIE, GBE

== Honours ==
- Delhi Durbar Gold Medal, 1903
- Knight Grand Commander of the Order of the Indian Empire (GCIE), 1907
- Delhi Durbar Gold Medal, 1911
- Knight Grand Commander of the Order of the Star of India (GCSI, 1911) (KCSI, 1900)
- Knight Grand Cross of the Order of the British Empire (GBE), 1918
- King George V Silver Jubilee Medal, 1935
- King George VI Coronation Medal, 1937

== Legacy ==
Rolls-Royce

In 2011, his 1925 Phantom I Rolls-Royce, customised with mounted guns and searchlights for tiger hunting, came up for auction in the US. The auto is expected to sell for up to $1.6 million.

Umed Singh II Hada Dynasty Born: 15 September 1873 Died: 27 December 1940
Regnal titles
Preceded by Shatru Sal II (as Maharao of Kotah)	Maharao of Kotah; 1889–1940	Succeeded by Bhim Singh II
