= Lothian Scott =

Scottish cricketer, British Army officer, engineer and inventor

Personal information
- Full name: Lothian Kerr Scott
- Born: 24 May 1841; Boulogne-sur-Mer, Nord-Pas-de-Calais, France
- Died: 7 July 1919 (aged 78); Farnborough, Hampshire, England
- Batting: Right-handed
- Bowling: Right-arm roundarm medium

Career statistics
Competition	First-class
Matches	1
Runs scored	16
Batting average	8.00
100s/50s	–/–
Top score	16
Balls bowled	48
Wickets	0
Bowling average	–
5 wickets in innings	–
10 wickets in match	–
Best bowling	–
Catches/stumpings	3/–
- Source: Cricinfo, 27 July 2020

Lothian Kerr Scott CB (24 May 1841 – 7 July 1919) was a Scottish first-class cricketer, British Army officer and military engineer.

The son of the Scotsman George Scott and Emily Alexandrina Georgina Graham, daughter of the general George James Graham, he was born in France at Boulogne-sur-Mer. He was educated in England at Winchester College, before attending the Royal Military Academy, Woolwich. He graduated from Woolwich into the Royal Engineers as a lieutenant in June 1862. Scott played first-class cricket for the Gentlemen of Kent against the Gentlemen of Marylebone Cricket Club at Canterbury in 1864. Batting twice in the match, he was dismissed in the Gentlemen of Kent first innings for 16 runs by Henry Arkwright, while in their second innings he was dismissed without scoring by Harvey Fellows. After this, he served in Ireland at Curragh Camp until 1868, before volunteering for service in British India in that year. Scott was employed in India in Public Works, Railways and Irrigation. He was twice invalided while in India, firstly in 1869 and again in 1871.

Returning to the United Kingdom, Scott served as a musketry inspector at Chatham until 1877. A year prior to his redeployment from Chatham, he was promoted to captain. From Chatham he became an instructor of fortifications at Sandhurst until 1882, the same year in which he became a major. From 1883 to 1889, he was professor of fortifications and artillery at Sandhurst. Scott was promoted to lieutenant colonel in June 1887. From 1889 to 1891 he was an instructor to the Royal Artillery in artillery sights. Scott had invented and patented several telescopic sights and improvements to them. He retired from active service in July 1892 and was made a Companion to the Order of the Bath in 1897 New Year Honours. Scott died in July 1919 at Farnborough, Hampshire.
