= Henry Lake Wells =

English army officer

Henry Lake Wells CIE
- Born: 8 March 1850; Portlemouth, Devonshire
- Died: 31 August 1898 (aged 48); Karachi, British Raj
- Spouse: Alice Bertha Bacon (m. 1885)
- Military career
- Allegiance: United Kingdom
- Branch: British Army
- Service years: 1871–1898
- Rank: Lieutenant-colonel
- Conflicts: Second Anglo-Afghan War (WIA)

Lieutenant-colonel Henry Lake Wells CIE (8 March 1850 – 31 August 1898) of the Royal Engineers was a British Army officer and civil servant.

== Life ==
=== Origins ===
Henry Lake Wells, son of Thomas Bury Wells, Rector of Portlemouth, Devonshire, was born on 8 March 1850. He received a commission as lieutenant in the Royal Engineers on 2 August 1871. He was specially employed in the War Office in 1873 and 1874, and went to India in 1875.

=== Afghanistan ===
Wells served in the Afghan Campaign of 1878–9, raised a corps of Ghilzai labourers and constructed a road across the Khojak, and was for some time in sole charge of the public works department at Quetta, where he built the native cantonments. He commanded detachments of Punjab cavalry and Sind horse in an engagement near the Khojak, where he was wounded. He accompanied General Biddulph's force down the Thal Chotiali route, took part in the action at Baghao, served with the Khaibar line force, was present at the action of Majina, and had charge of the positions at the crossing of the Kabul River. He was five times mentioned in despatches, Sir Donald Stewart recommending him to notice "for conspicuous gallantry and bravery displayed on the occasion of the attack on a robber encampment under Laskar Khan by a party from the Chamun post".

=== Persia ===
Wells surveyed routes in 1879–80 in Kashmir and Gilgit for a line of telegraph, and in the latter year was appointed to the Government Indo-European Telegraph in Persia as assistant director. During many years spent in Persia he surveyed routes between Dizful and Shiraz, and contributed papers to the Royal Geographical Society, the Society of Arts and other learned societies, and to the professional papers of his own corps. He was repeatedly thanked for his services, especially for those rendered in the delimitation of the Afghan frontier in 1886, the army remount operations for India in 1887, in the cholera epidemic, and during the revolution in Shiraz in 1893.

Wells became director of the Persian Telegraph in 1891. He was presented by Shah Nasr-ud-Din, with a Sword of Honour, and by his successor, Shah Muraffer, with a Diamond Ring, and on 1 January 1897 he was made a Companion of the Order of the Indian Empire. He attained the rank of lieutenant-colonel on 6 November 1896.

=== Death and legacy ===
Wells died suddenly at Karachi on 31 August 1898. He married, on 15 January 1885, in London, Alice Bertha, daughter of the Reverend Hugh Bacon.
