= Tixall Wide =

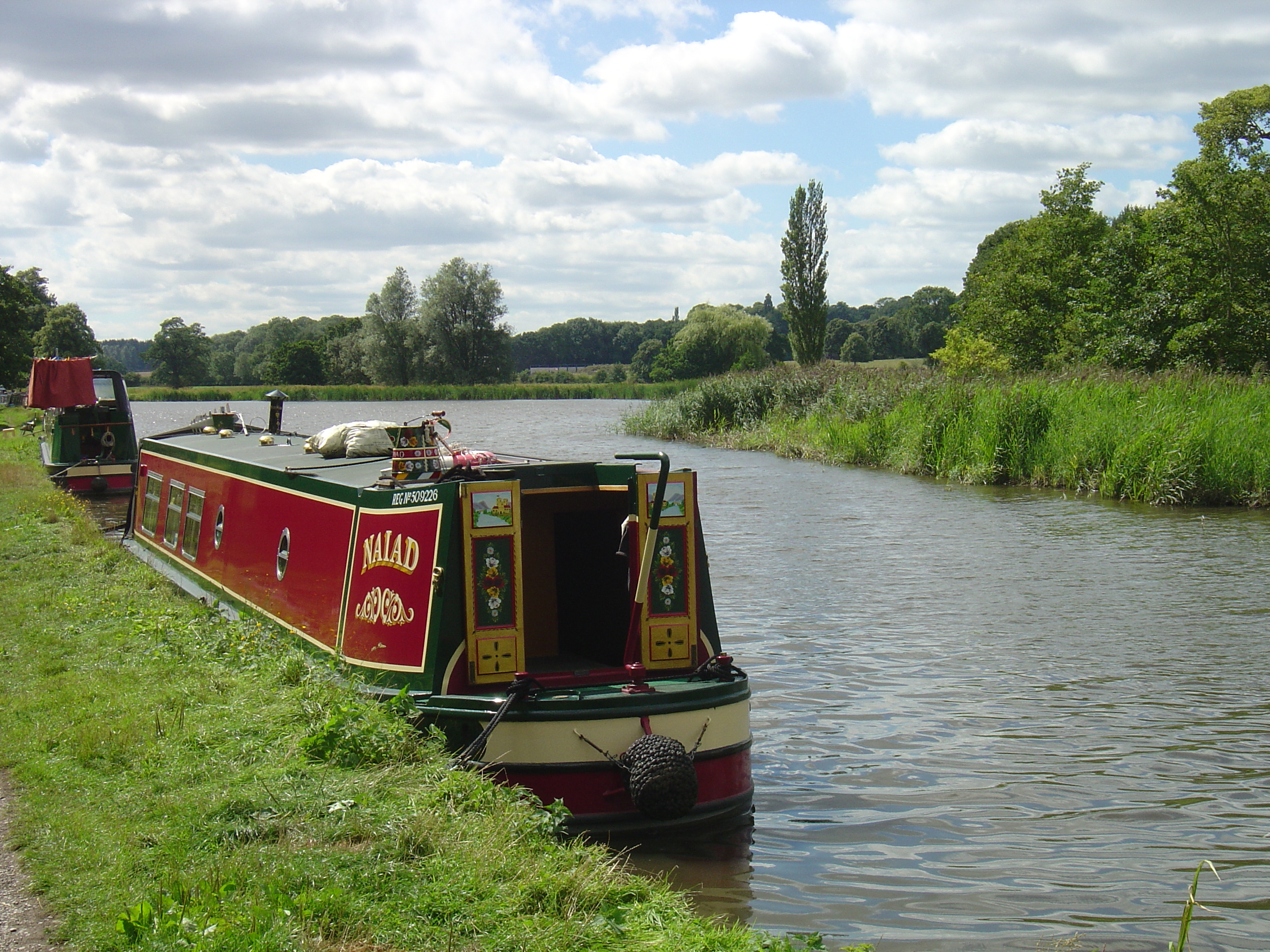
- Tixall Wide

- Location within Staffordshire
- Coordinates: 52.802°N 2.025°W
- Type: Widened canal
- Primary inflows: Staffordshire and Worcestershire Canal
- Primary outflows: Staffordshire and Worcestershire Canal

Tixall Wide, also known as Tixall Broad or The Broad Water, is a body of water that forms part of the Staffordshire and Worcestershire Canal near Tixall in Staffordshire, England, to the south of the former Tixall Hall.

The lake was probably created during the construction of the canal in 1771. At that time, the hall was owned by Thomas Clifford, the fourth son of Hugh Clifford, 3rd Baron Clifford of Chudleigh, and the grounds had been designed on the advice of the landscape architect Lancelot "Capability" Brown. It is said Clifford "gave permission for the canal to pass through his land on the condition that it was made ... wide enough to look like a lake from the house". and thus in order not to spoil the view.

The towpath is a very popular overnight mooring spot. Boaters moored here, or just passing through, have an excellent view of the magnificent Elizabethan gatehouse that is the only remaining part of Tixall Hall.

It has also been suggested that the canal was routed to utilise a lake that already existed, in which the angler and writer Izaak Walton had learned to fish.
