= Jacob Davies =

Welsh Baptist missionary (1816-1849)

Jacob Davies (1816–1849) was a Welsh Baptist missionary from the Newtown area of Montgomeryshire. He became a Baptist in 1835. In 1837, he began preaching, and, in 1840, moved to study at Horton College in Bradford. He married Eliza Green of Peckham.

In 1844, he was appointed to a missionary position in Ceylon; but within a few years his health began to fail.

In February 1849, he supported the Kandyans against the Governor of Ceylon, Lord Torrington, following the Matale rebellion. After 5 years in Ceylon, he died in Colombo, on 2 November 1849, of cholera at the home of Dr Elliott. and was buried at Wolvendaal Church.

His only son, Sir James Ackworth Davies (1845-1906), was a judge in the Madras Civil Service including serving for many years as a Judge of the High Court, Madras.
