= Rupert Rogers =

English cricketer

Personal information
- Full name: Rupert Ashby Cave Rogers
- Born: 27 May 1902; Tixall, Staffordshire, England
- Died: 2 May 1976 (aged 73); Eastbourne, Sussex, England
- Batting: Right-handed

Career statistics
Competition	FC
Matches	1
Runs scored	3
Batting average	3.00
100s/50s	0/0
Top score	3
Balls bowled	30
Wickets	0
Bowling average	-
5 wickets in innings	0
10 wickets in match	0
Best bowling	-
Catches/stumpings	1/0
- Source: CricketArchive, 5 May 2009

Rupert Ashby Cave Rogers (27 May 1902 – 2 May 1976) was an English cricketer who played a single first-class match, a friendly for Worcestershire against Warwickshire in 1919. Batting at three in his only innings, he made only 3. He took no wickets from his five overs, but held one catch, to dismiss Warwickshire opener Horace Venn.

Rogers was later known as Rupert Ashby Cave-Rogers.
