= Charles Chetwynd-Talbot, 2nd Earl Talbot =

British politician (1777–1849)

The Right Honourable The Earl Talbot KG KP PC FRS
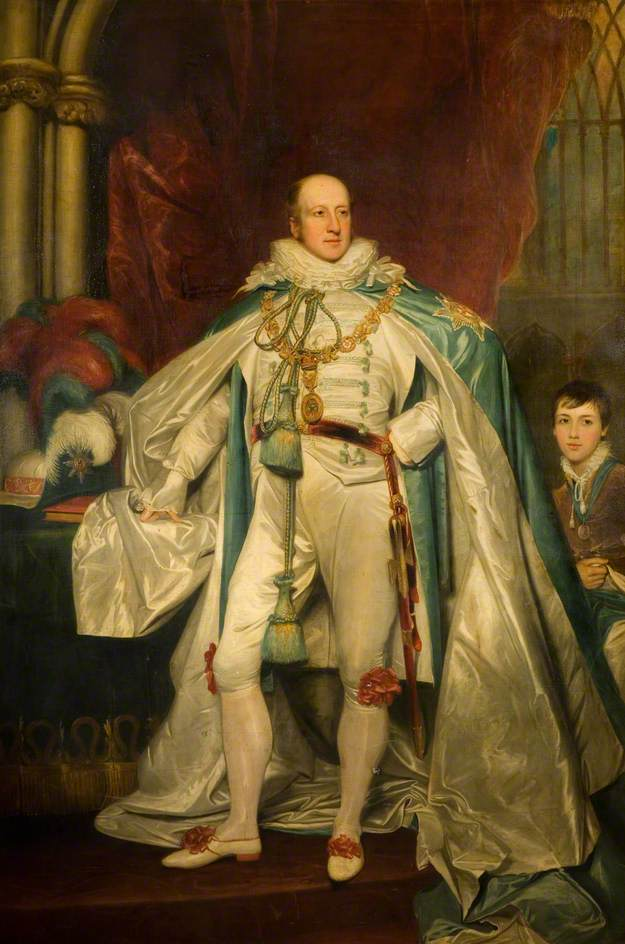
- Portrait by Thomas Clement Thompson, 1844

Lord Lieutenant of Ireland
- In office 3 October 1817 – 8 December 1821
- Monarchs: George III; George IV
- Prime Minister: The Earl of Liverpool
- Preceded by: The Earl Whitworth
- Succeeded by: The Marquess Wellesley

Personal details
- Born: 25 April 1777
- Died: 10 January 1849 (aged 71) Ingestre Hall, Staffordshire
- Spouse: Frances Lambart (d. 1819)
- Children: 11, including Henry, Cecil, William, and Patrick
- Parent(s): John Chetwynd-Talbot, 1st Earl Talbot; Lady Charlotte Hill
- Education: Christ Church, Oxford

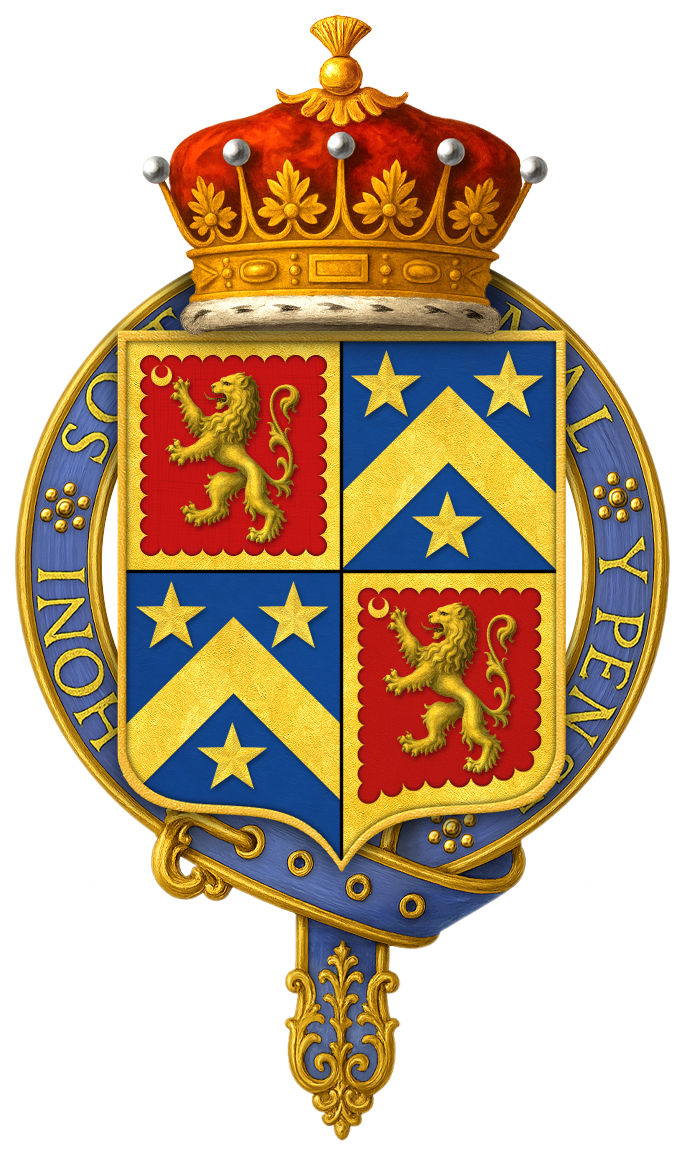
Quartered arms of Charles Chetwynd-Talbot, 2nd Earl Talbot, KG, PC, FRS

Charles Chetwynd Chetwynd-Talbot, 2nd Earl Talbot, KG, PC, FRS (25 April 1777 – 10 January 1849), styled Viscount of Ingestre between 1784 and 1793, was a British politician who served as the Lord Lieutenant of Ireland from 1817 to 1821.

== Background and education ==
Born as Charles Talbot, he was the eldest son of John Talbot of Ingestre Hall and his wife, Lady Charlotte Hill, a daughter of Wills Hill, 1st Marquess of Downshire. When John Talbot was created Earl Talbot and Viscount of Ingestre in 1784, Charles Talbot assumed the latter title as a courtesy title. His father also added Chetwynd to the family name in 1786.

He inherited his father's earldom and the Ingestre estate in 1793, matriculated from Christ Church, Oxford in 1794 and graduated as a Master of Arts in 1797. He commissioned the architect John Nash to renovate Ingestre around 1810.

== Early career ==
After leaving Oxford, Lord Talbot joined the British embassy in Russia under Lord Whitworth, forming a lasting friendship with his boss. In 1803, Lord Talbot organised a volunteer force in Staffordshire to oppose a planned invasion by Napoleon. In 1812, he was appointed Lord Lieutenant of that county, an office he held until his death. He was elected a Fellow of the Royal Society in 1813.

== Lord Lieutenant of Ireland ==
In 1817, Talbot was also appointed Lord Lieutenant of Ireland and admitted to the Privy Council. In recognition of his rendering services to the agriculture of Ireland, he was awarded the Freedom of Drogheda and during George IV's visit to the country in 1821, he was appointed a Knight of St Patrick. Although an opponent of Catholic emancipation, Daniel O'Connell gave Talbot credit for his impartiality and Lord Cloncurry called him 'an honourable, high-minded gentleman'. However, the growing discontent in Ireland under Talbot's administration, forced the Prime Minister, Lord Liverpool, to have him replaced with Lord Wellesley in December 1821. Talbot Street in Dublin city was named after him in 1821.

== Later life ==
In 1833, Lord Talbot was encouraged to stand for the chancellorship of Oxford University, but withdrew in deference to the Duke of Wellington. In 1839, in recognition of his services as Lord Lieutenant of Staffordshire, Talbot received a testimonial of £1400, which he used to endow a new church at Salt, Staffordshire. A supporter of Robert Peel, he resigned as a Knight of St Patrick in place of being appointed a Knight of the Garter in 1844, on Peel's recommendation. Lord Talbot subsequently supported the repeal of the Corn Laws, being one of the first peers to do so.

As a Staffordshire landowner, Lord Talbot gave land at Hixon for construction of the parish church in 1846 and had the Red Lion Public House at Brereton rebuilt in 1847. As a result of the Slave Compensation Act 1837, Talbot was given a sum of money in compensation from the British government as the executor of Sir Rose Price, 1st Baronet; Price's estate included the "Worthy Park" and "Mickleton Pen" slave plantations in Saint John Parish, Jamaica.

== Family ==
Lord Talbot married Frances Thomasine (d. 1819), daughter of Charles Lambart, in 1800. They had eleven surviving children:

- Lady Frances Charlotte (1801–1823), married William Legge, 4th Earl of Dartmouth
- Charles Thomas, styled Viscount Ingestre (1802–1826)
- Henry John, later styled Viscount Ingestre, later 3rd Earl Talbot and 18th Earl of Shrewsbury.
- Arthur (1805–1884), clergyman.
- John (1806–1852), judge and member of the Canterbury Association. Father of John Gilbert Talbot.
- Lady Cecil Chetwynd (1808–1877), married John Kerr, 7th Marquess of Lothian.
- (George) Gustavus (1810–1896), clergyman.
- William Whitworth (1814–1888), clergyman.
- Gilbert Chetwynd (1816–1896), clergyman.
- Wellington Patrick Manvers (1817–1898), soldier.
- Gerald (1819–1885)

Lady Talbot died in December 1819, less than three months after the birth of her youngest child. Lord Talbot died at his home, Ingestre Hall, in January 1849, aged 71, and was succeeded by his eldest surviving son, Henry, who later also inherited the earldom of Shrewsbury from his distant cousin.

== Ancestry ==
Ancestry of Charles Chetwynd-Talbot, 2nd Earl Talbot

8. Charles Talbot, 1st Baron Talbot
4. John Talbot
9. Cecil Mathew
2. John Chetwynd-Talbot, 1st Earl Talbot
10. John Chetwynd, 2nd Viscount Chetwynd
5. Catherine Chetwynd, Baroness Talbot
11. Esther Kent, Viscountess Chetwynd
1. Charles Chetwynd-Talbot, 2nd Earl Talbot
12. Trevor Hill, 1st Viscount Hillsborough
6. Wills Hill, 1st Marquess of Downshire
13. Mary Rowe, Viscountess Hillsborough
3. Lady Charlotte Hill, Countess Talbot
14. Robert FitzGerald, 19th Earl of Kildare
7. Margaretta FitzGerald, Marchioness of Downshire
15. Mary O'Brien, Countess of Kildare

Political offices
Preceded by The Earl Whitworth	Lord Lieutenant of Ireland; 1817–1821	Succeeded by The Marquess Wellesley
Honorary titles
Preceded by The Earl of Uxbridge	Lord Lieutenant of Staffordshire; 1812–1849	Succeeded by The Marquess of Anglesey
Preceded by The Marquess of Stafford	Custos Rotulorum of Staffordshire; 1828–1849	Succeeded by The Marquess of Anglesey
Peerage of Great Britain
Preceded by John Chetwynd-Talbot	Earl Talbot; 1793–1849	Succeeded by Henry John Chetwynd-Talbot
