= Trevredyn Rashleigh Wynne =

Sir Trevredyn Rashleigh Wynne KCSI KCIE VD KStJ (1853–1942) was the Managing Director of the Bengal-Nagpur Railway Company from 1915 until 1930 when he became Chairman. During his long career he expanded the length of the Indian Railways by more than 5 times its original size and had an influential share in the construction and management of Indian Railways.

== Career ==
Wynne was the son of Llewelyn Wynne of Mold, Flintshire and was educated at Brighton College and the Royal Indian Engineering College, Coopers Hill.

Wynne first went out to India in 1874 as an assistant railway engineer in the Public Works Department. In 1887 he resigned from his position in government to join the Bengal-Nagpur Railway Company, which was formed in that year, as its chief engineer. During his time as chief engineer he carried out 2500 miles of lines.

In 1908 he was made President of the Railway Board of India and retired from the position in 1914 upon which he returned to England. In England Sir Wynne was appointed the Government Director of Indian Railway Companies at the India Office. Unfortunately the pull of India was too great and he returned to India the following year to become managing Director of the company he used to work for; Bengal-Nagpur Railway. He later became Chairman in 1930.

Sir Trevredyn Wynne received a number of decorations during his life. He was created a Companion of the Order of the Indian Empire (CIE) in the 1903 Durbar Honours, and promoted to a Knight Commander of the order (KCIE) in 1909. He was appointed a Knight Commander of the Star of India in 1911 and was a Knight of the Order of St. John of Jerusalem.

He held the Volunteer Decoration and was a member of the Institution of Civil Engineers and of the Institute of Transport.

Sir Trevredyn Wynne died at his home in Leatherhead on 28 June 1942 at the age of 88.

== Family ==
Wynne married in 1906 Winifred Conduitt, the daughter of Henry Conduitt; they had one son.
