= James Ackworth Davies =

British judge (1845–1906)

Sir James Ackworth Davies (1845–1906) was a member of the Indian Civil Service and a judge of the High Court of Judicature at Fort Saint George.

Davies, the son of Jacob and Eliza Davies, joined the Indian Civil Service, and served as Under Secretary to the Indian government in Judicial and Legislative departments. He was knighted in the 1903 Durbar Honours.

Davies is believed to have married in 1868. Unknown if any issue.
