= Baghao =

- Country: Pakistan
- Province: Balochistan
- Time zone: UTC+5 (PST)

Baghao is a town and union council of Barkhan District in the Balochistan province of Pakistan. The area has some of the most productive soil in the district.
