= John Eliot (meteorologist) =

English-born Indian metereologist (1839–1908)

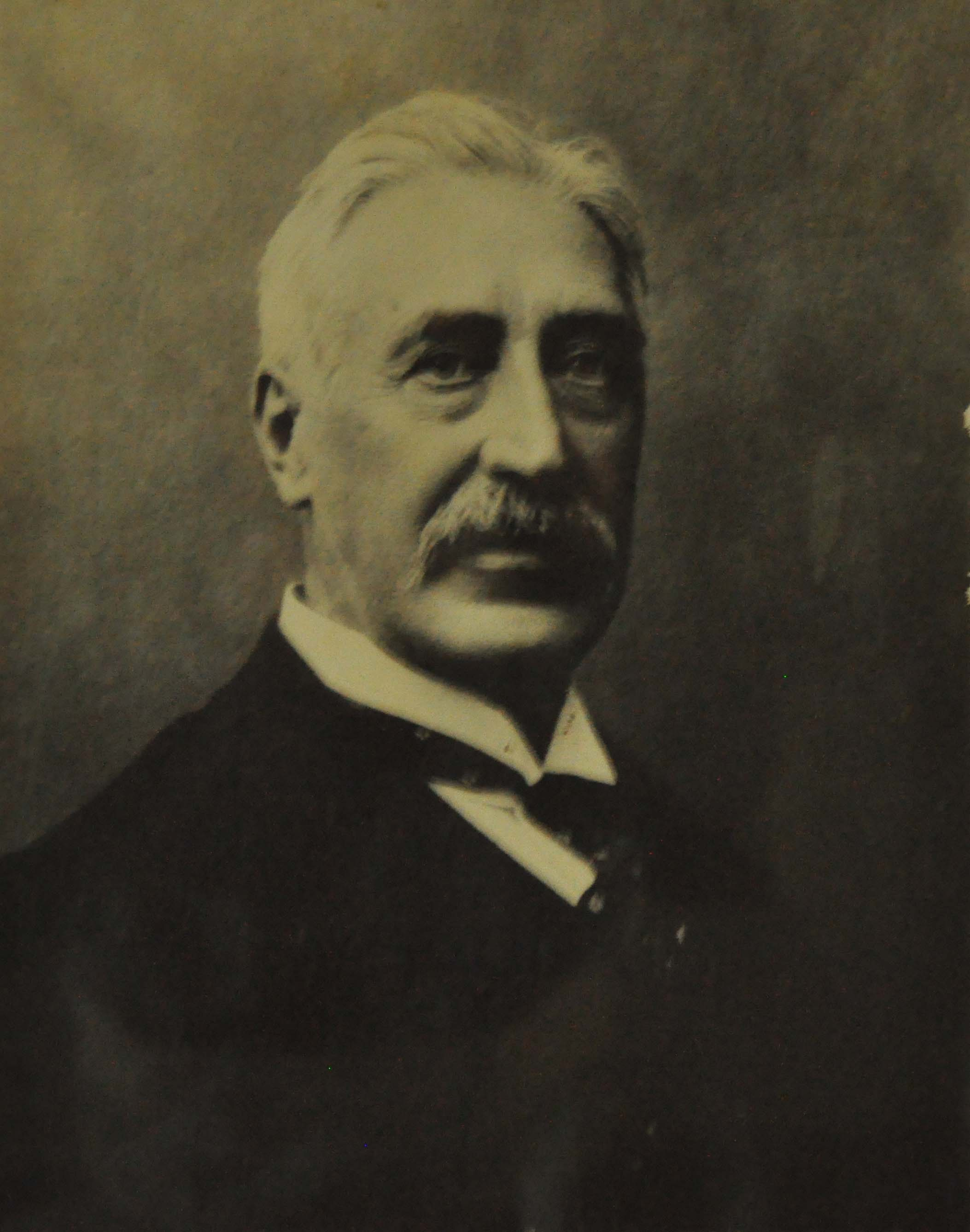

Sir John Eliot KCIE FRS (25 May 1839 – 18 March 1908) was a mathematician and meteorologist who served as the second meteorological reporter to the Indian government, succeeding Henry Francis Blanford. He served as the director-general of Indian observatories from 1899 until his retirement in 1903. He was noted for reorganizing the Indian meteorological department and for his attempts to improve predictions on the monsoons.

== Biography ==
Eliot was born at Lamesley in Durham, son of Peter Elliott of Lamesley, schoolmaster, by his wife Margaret. He changed the spelling of his surname to Eliot. Matriculating at the rather late age of twenty-six at St. John's College, Cambridge, in 1865, he graduated B.A. in 1869 as second wrangler and first Smith's prizeman. Soon elected to a fellowship, he accepted, owing to weak health and with a view to avoiding the climate of England, the professorship of mathematics at the Engineering College at Roorkee in the North-West Provinces, under the Indian government. In 1872 he was transferred to the regular Indian Educational Service as professor of mathematics at the Muir Central College, Allahabad. With that office was combined that of superintendent of the Meteorological Observatory. In 1874 he migrated to Calcutta as professor of physical science in the Presidency College and meteorological reporter to the government of Bengal. In 1886, he succeeded Henry Francis Blanford as meteorological reporter to the government of India and was appointed in addition director-general of Indian observatories in 1899. Blanford had established a link between snowfall in the Himalayas and the intensity of the monsoons. Famine years were preceded by heavy snowfall in the Himalayas. Eliot took this further by examining correlations between the monsoons and weather in other parts of the world. Eliot however did not use numerical approaches to examine these relations and believed for instance that a high pressure over Mauritius contributed to the intensity of the monsoons. Based on such ideas he began to produce monsoon forecasts that ran to nearly 30 pages. In 1899, his prediction of higher than normal rains led to considerable embarrassment for the government as India suffered a famine. Reviews in the newspapers led to subsequent predictions being issued as confidential reports to the government. Eliot however improved the organisation of meteorological work in India that had been begun by Blanford. "The number of observatories working under or in connection with the department was increased from 135 to 240 (including two at an elevation of over 11,000 ft.) and the co-operation of the larger native states was secured. Under Sir John Eliot's superintendence the diffusion of weather information was extended by the issue of frequent reports at various centres. Methods of giving warnings of storms at sea were developed and telegraphic intimations of impending floods to engineers on large works under construction or in charge of railway canals and bridges saved the state from heavy losses. Vast improvement was effected in the mode of announcing . . . prospective drought and consequent danger of famine over greater or lesser areas."

Eliot was elected fellow of the Royal Society in 1895, and was made ClE in 1897. His last official step in India was to secure for his successor the increase of the scientific staff of which he had himself felt the need. He retired from India in 1903 and was created KCIE in the 1903 New Year Honours. On his return to England he actively pursued his meteorological work. He joined the committee of management of the Solar Physics Observatory at South Kensington under the board of education. He was a member of the International Meteorological Committee from 1896 till his death. He was also secretary of the solar commission, suggested by Sir Norman Lockyer to the International Meteorological Committee which met at Southport in 1903. The purpose of the committee was to collect comparable meteorological data from all parts of the world and solar data for comparison with them. At the British Association meeting at Cambridge in 1904 he presided over the subsection for astronomy and cosmical physics, and there advocated the organisation of meteorological work upon an imperial basis and an imperial provision "for organised observations from areas too wide to be within the control of any single government."

Eliot was an accomplished musician, he played well on both the organ and the piano. He married Mary, daughter of William Nevill FGS, of Godalming in 1877. He died suddenly of apoplexy on 18 March 1908 at Bon Porto, the estate which he had acquired for his wife's health at Var in the south of France. He was buried within his own estate. Three sons survived him.

== Contributions to meteorology ==
Eliot's contributions to meteorological science are chiefly to be found in the long and important series of Indian meteorological memoirs published by his department. Of special value is a short paper on Indian famines contributed to the Congress of Meteorologists at Chicago in 1893.

Of his separate publications the chief are:

- Report of the Vizingapatam and Backergunge Cyclones of October 1876, with charts (Calcutta, 1877, fol.), a copy of which was ordered to be laid on the table of the House of Commons.
- Report on the Madras Cyclone of May 1877, with charts (Calcutta, 1879, fol.).
- Handbook of Cyclonic Storms in the Bay of Bengal (Calcutta, 1890; 2nd edit. 1900), a work of the highest service to navigation by its warnings and counsel.
- Climatological Atlas of India, 1906, Indian Meteorological Department, 120 plates (published by authority of the government of India), a wonderful pictorial representation of patient and painstaking work combined with skilful and stringent organisation. The text accompanying these maps was under preparation but were never published due to the death of Eliot.
