= Ingestre Hall =

17th-century Jacobean mansion at Ingestre, Staffordshire, England

Coordinates: 52.8197°N 2.0372°W

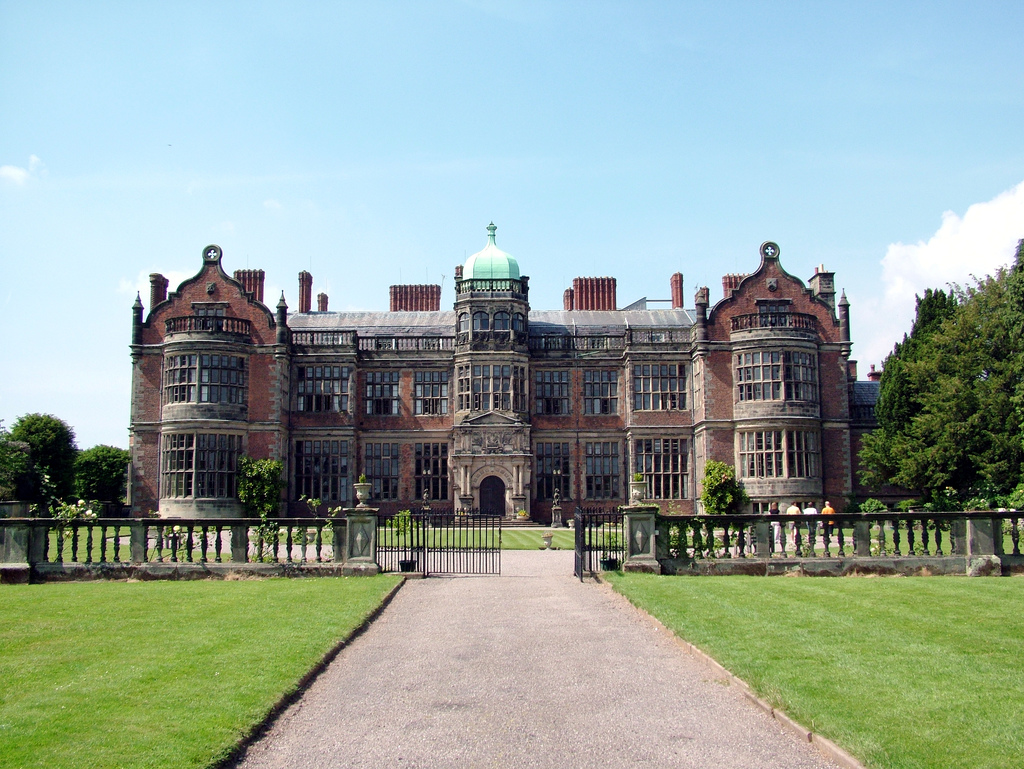

- Location within Staffordshire

General information
- Architectural style: Jacobean
- Location: Great Haywood, Staffordshire, England
- Owner: Earl Talbot, Earl of Shrewsbury, Sandwell Metropolitan Borough Council

Ingestre Hall is a Grade II* 17th-century Jacobean mansion situated at Ingestre, near Stafford, Staffordshire, England. Formerly the seat of the Earls Talbot and then the Earls of Shrewsbury, the hall is now owned by Sandwell Metropolitan Borough Council and is in use as a residential arts and conference centre.

== History ==
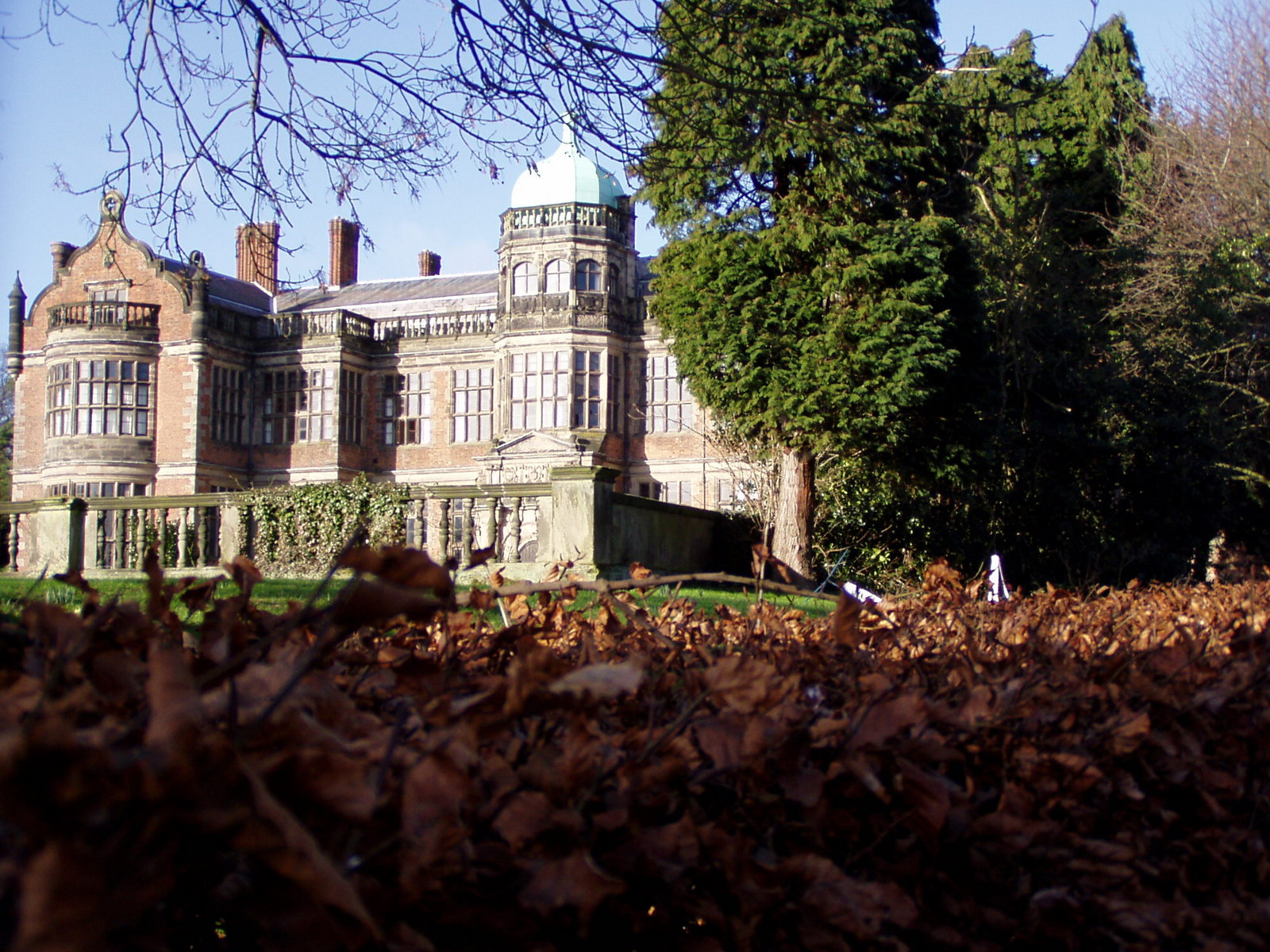
Ingestre Hall, Staffordshire, from behind the beech hedge

Ingestre is mentioned in the Domesday Book. During the reign of Henry II the manor was owned by the de Mutton family. During the reign of Edward III the house passed to the Chetwynd family, through the marriage of heiress Isabel de Mutton and Sir John Chetwynd. Their descendants were raised to the peerage in 1733 as Baron Talbot and later in the century as Earl Talbot.

The imposing mansion was built in red brick, on the site of an earlier manor house, in 1613 for Sir Walter Chetwynd, (High Sheriff of Staffordshire in 1607). A later Walter Chetwynd, his grandson, was created Viscount Chetwynd in 1717. The daughter and heiress of the 2nd Viscount married Hon. John Talbot in 1748 and their son John Chetwynd-Talbot (who was later 3rd Baron Talbot, and from 1784 Viscount Ingestre and Earl Talbot) inherited the Ingestre estate.

The house was renovated in the early 19th century by architect John Nash for the 2nd Earl, Charles Chetwynd-Talbot. In 1856 the 3rd Earl and 3rd Viscount Ingestre, Henry John Chetwynd-Talbot, succeeded a distant cousin to become the 18th Earl of Shrewsbury. The hall was badly damaged by fire and largely rebuilt in 1882. The rebuilding was to the designs of the Adelphi, London based architect, John Birch.

In 1895, Charles Chetwynd-Talbot, 20th Earl of Shrewsbury founded the Staffordshire Polo Club at Ingestre Hall. Players included Charles Stanhope, 8th Earl of Harrington, Algernon Burnaby, Captain Daily Fergusson, Captain the Hon. Robert Greville, Gerald Hardy, Albert Jones, Captain "Wengy" Jones, Edward and George Miller, Norman Nickalls, Bertram Portal, Captain Gordon Renton, Jasper Selwyn and John Reid Walker.

The Ingestre estate of 1,100 acres (450 ha) was broken up in 1960 when sold off by the 21st Earl. West Bromwich Borough Council (later to become part of Sandwell Metropolitan Borough Council) purchased the Hall in 27 acres (11 ha), and has since operated a Residential Arts Centre from the site.

== Residential arts centre ==
The 1961 sale stipulated that the hall "must be used for the purpose of promoting the arts and education". Ingestre Hall hosts schools and youth groups for children between 7 and post 16 and provides "enrichment of education and life experiences for children and young people through the creative arts".

Ingestre Hall projects its aims to "extend the legacy of Ingestre Arts to be nationally recognised as a centre of excellence where children and young people’s horizons are broadened and where they are inspired and motivated to achieve their full potential in an aspirational environment where creativity and sense of self is valued and encouraged to blossom". Ingestre Hall is unique in the UK as a local authority arts centre that has welcomed, over the past five years, more than 12,000 children and young people on arts residentials.

== See also ==
- Grade II* listed buildings in Stafford (borough)
- Listed buildings in Ingestre
