= Lewis Tupper =

Sir Charles Lewis Tupper, KCIE, CSI (16 May 1848 – 20 July 1910) was a British administrator in India. A member of the Indian Civil Service, he spent most of his career in the Punjab.

He was one of the co-funders of the Punjab University, and was its vice-chancellor from 1900 to 1901.
