= John Chetwynd-Talbot, 1st Earl Talbot =

British peer and politician (1749–1793)

The Right Honourable John Chetwynd-Talbot
- 1st Earl Talbot
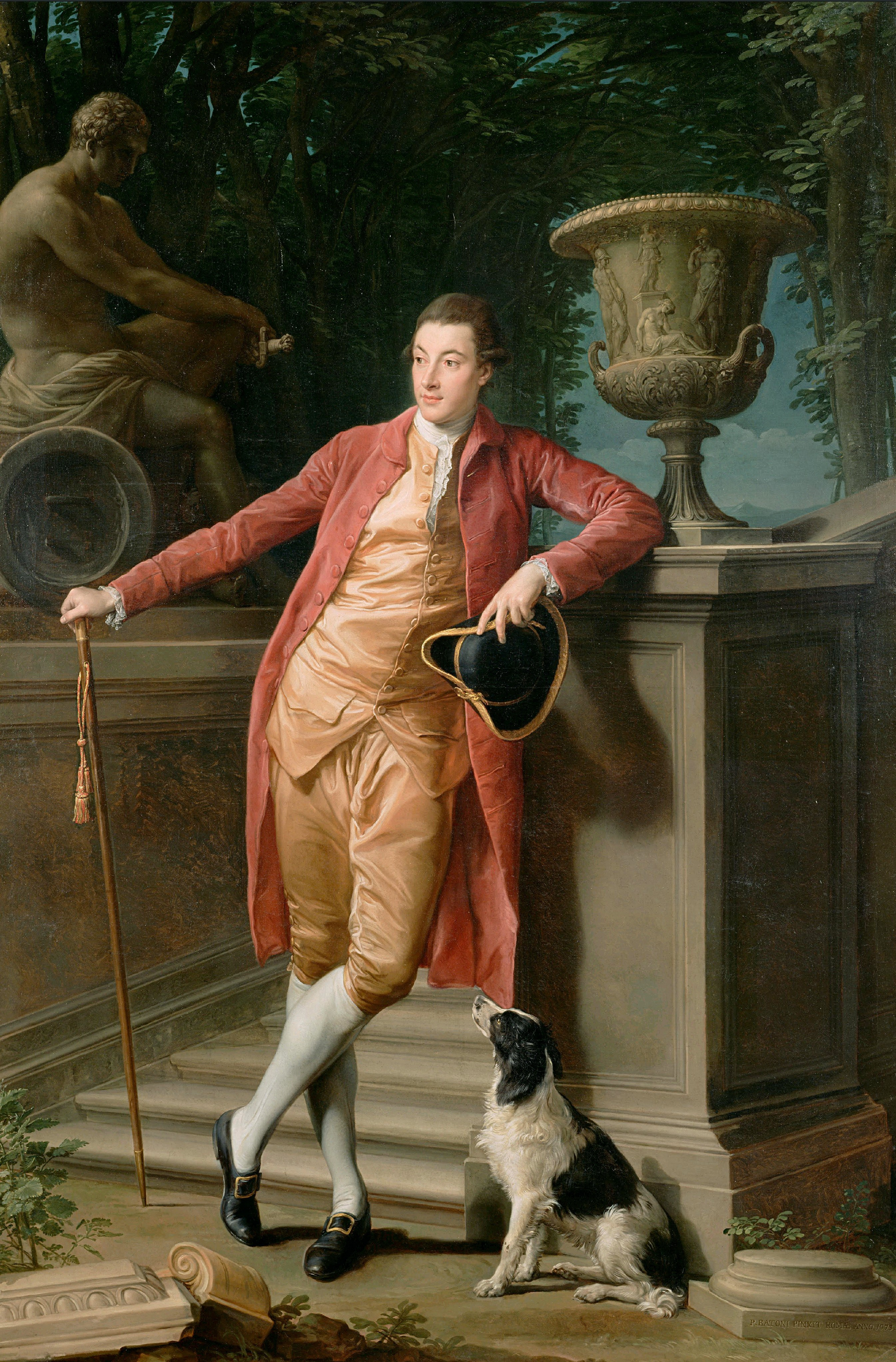
- Portrait of John Talbot, later 1st Earl Talbot by Pompeo Batoni, 1773.
- Tenure: 1784–1793 (Earl Talbot); 1782–1793 (Baron Talbot)
- Predecessor: New creation (Earl Talbot); William Talbot, 1st Earl Talbot (Baron Talbot)
- Successor: Charles Chetwynd-Talbot, 2nd Earl Talbot
- Born: 25 February 1749
- Died: 19 May 1793 (aged 44)
- Spouse: Lady Charlotte Hill (m. 1776)
- Issue: Charles Chetwynd-Talbot, 2nd Earl Talbot

John Talbot, 1st Earl Talbot (25 February 1749 – 19 May 1793), known as John Talbot until 1782 and as the Lord Talbot between 1782 and 1784, was a British peer and politician.

== Background ==
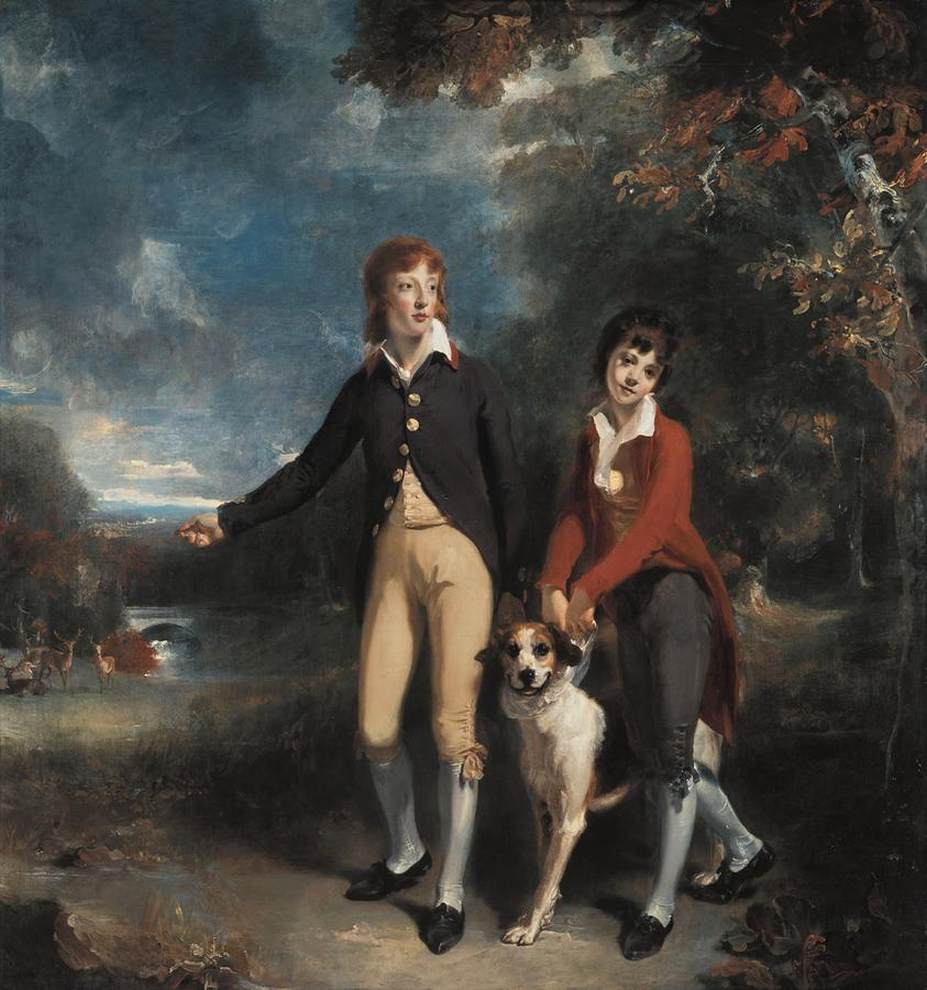
Portrait of Charles (1777-1849) and John Chetwynd-Talbot (1779-1825) by Thomas Lawrence, painted in 1793

A member of Talbot family headed by the Earl of Shrewsbury, Talbot was the son of John Talbot, younger son of Charles Talbot, 1st Baron Talbot, and his wife Catherine, daughter of John Chetwynd, 2nd Viscount Chetwynd.

== Political career ==
Talbot was returned to Parliament for Castle Rising in 1777, a seat he held until 1782, when he succeeded his uncle, William Talbot, 1st Earl Talbot, as third Baron Talbot and entered the House of Lords. In 1784 the earldom of Talbot which had become extinct on his uncle's death was revived when Talbot was created Viscount of Ingestre, in the County of Stafford, and Earl Talbot, of Hensol in the County of Glamorgan. Two years later he assumed by Royal licence the additional surname and arms of Chetwynd, having inherited Ingestre Hall via his mother from the Chetwynd family.

== Family ==
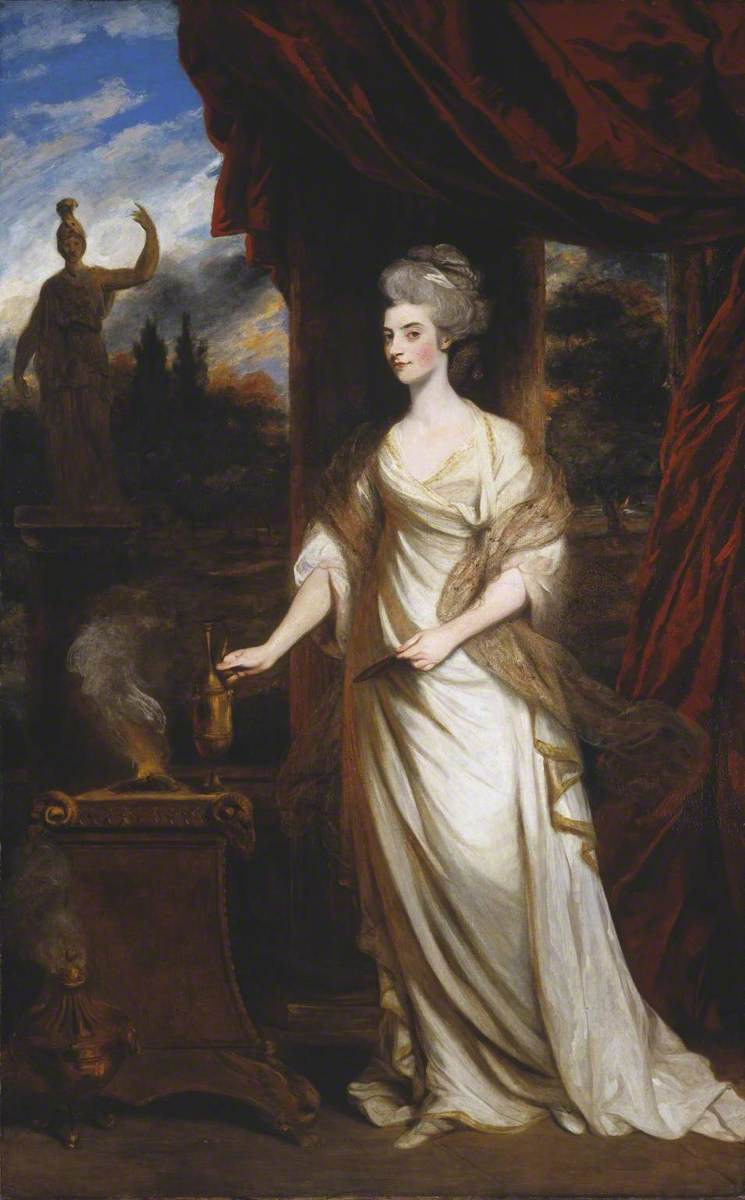
Lady Charlotte Hill, Countess Talbot, 1782 by Joshua Reynolds.

Lord Talbot married Lady Charlotte, daughter of Wills Hill, 1st Marquess of Downshire, in 1776. A portrait of Talbot was painted by Pompeo Batoni while there are portraits of his wife by both Sir Joshua Reynolds (1783; now in Tate Britain) and by Thomas Gainsborough and John Hoppner (1788; now in the Dunedin Public Art Gallery). Lord Talbot died at Fairford, Gloucestershire, in May 1793, aged 44, and was succeeded in his titles by his eldest son, Charles, whose son Henry succeeded as Earl of Shrewsbury in 1858. The Countess Talbot died in January 1804.

== Ancestry ==
Ancestry of John Chetwynd-Talbot, 1st Earl Talbot

8. William Talbot
4. Charles Talbot, 1st Baron Talbot
9. Catharine King
2. John Talbot
10. Charles Mathew
5. Cecil Mathew
11. unknown
1. John Chetwynd-Talbot, 1st Earl Talbot
12. John Chetwynd
6. John Chetwynd, 2nd Viscount Chetwynd
13. Lucy Roane
3. Lady Catherine Chetwynd, Baroness Talbot
14. Richard Kent
7. Esther Kent, Viscountess Chetwynd
15. Katherine Kent

Parliament of Great Britain
Preceded by Robert Mackreth; Charles Finch	Member of Parliament for Castle Rising; 1777–1782; With: Robert Mackreth	Succeeded by Robert Mackreth; Sir James Erskine, Bt
Peerage of Great Britain
New creation	Earl Talbot; 1784–1793	Succeeded by Charles Chetwynd-Talbot
Preceded by William Talbot	Baron Talbot; 1782–1793	Succeeded by Charles Chetwynd-Talbot
