= Ingestre =

Village in Staffordshire, England

Coordinates: 52.821°N 2.0324°W

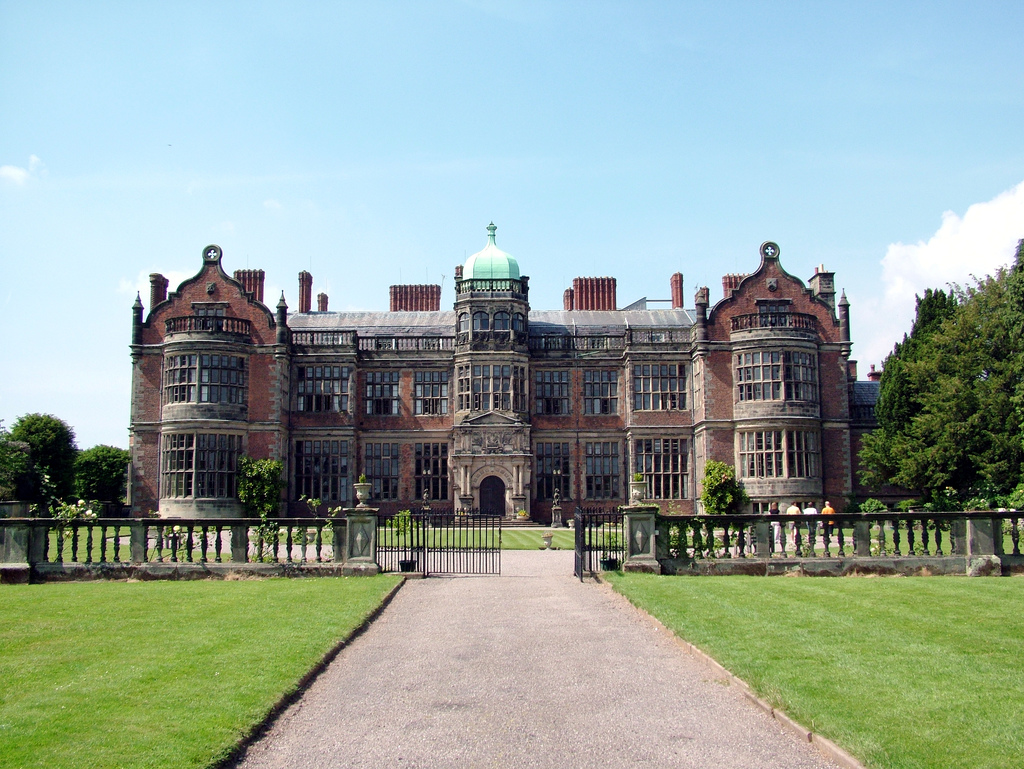
- Ingestre Hall

- Location within Staffordshire
- Population: 194 (2011)
- Civil parish: Ingestre
- District: Stafford
- Shire county: Staffordshire
- Region: West Midlands
- Country: England
- Sovereign state: United Kingdom
- Post town: STAFFORD
- Postcode district: ST18
- Dialling code: 01889
- UK Parliament: Stafford

Ingestre is a village and civil parish in the Stafford district, in the county of Staffordshire, England. The population of the civil parish taken at the 2011 census was 194. It is four miles to the north-east of the county town of Stafford.

Ingestre Hall is a local landmark.

It was formerly served by both Weston and Ingestre railway station and Ingestre railway station.

The village, and civil parish, of Tixall is nearby. The civil parishes of Tixall and Ingestre have shared a single parish council of Ingestre with Tixall since 1979.

== Etymology ==
The place-name is first attested in the Domesday Book of 1086, where it appears as In Gestreon. Ekwall proposed a meaning of "hill property", from Old English *ing, a hill, and gestreon, wealth or property. More recent scholarship, however, has suggested "the narrows of the Trent", on the assumption that the first element is a vernacular form (*engyst) of Latin angustiae, narrows.

== Ingestre church ==
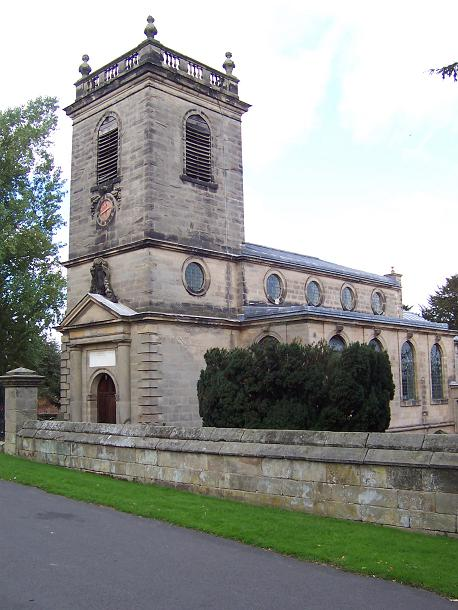
Ingestre church of St Mary the Virgin

Ingestre parish church of St Mary the Virgin, is positioned very close by "near the SE corner of the Hall, a small handsome fabric in the Grecian style, built in 1676, by Walter Chetwynd, Esq, at a short distance from the old one, which was taken down, after the bones and memorials of the dead had been removed from it to the new edifice." [From William White, History, Gazetteer and Directory of Staffordshire, Sheffield, 1851]

The church is widely reputed to have been designed by Sir Christopher Wren, and is "the only church outside London to be attributed to Sir Christopher Wren." This notion is strengthened when we consider that "Walter Chetwynd was a friend of Sir Christopher Wren and both were members of the Royal Society."

"A drawing by Wren annotated 'Mr Chetwynd's Tower' exists...Wren worked almost exclusively for the King...but in the case of St Mary('s Church, Ingestre) the exquisite quality speaks unequivocally."

"Ingestre (Staffs). Dating from the rebuilding of the church in 1676. The screen including the Royal Arms was designed by Wren. In his own words: "an elegant skreen of Flanders Oak garnisht with the Kings Armes". See Our Christian Heritage by Warwick Rodwell and James Bentley (London, 1984), pp. 207–8."

"Dr. Palliser, perhaps over-defensively at times, correctly asserts that Staffordshire has much to offer in its own right - some fine medieval parish churches, such as Clifton Campville (near Lichfield), a notable group of Gothic survival churches, Wren’s Ingestre, Broughton Hall, Staffordshire and much of first importance from the post industrial period of the county’s history."

"The church of St Mary the Virgin in Ingestre, has the distinction of being the sole Wren church outside London. Although the stone is duller than the city churches, the building that stands next to Ingestre's Carolean hall is recognisably of the same design (particularly to St Mary Somerset). The interior is decorated with plaster carvings, Grinling Gibbons woodwork and Burne-Jones stained glass, showing blood dripping from a pelican onto Adam and Eve, who bear crimson halos and wings. Unusually, the marble monuments have been painted and gilded."

The church was consecrated in August 1677 with a full day of services with "the Bishop baptizing a child, churching a woman, joining a couple in matrimony and burying another, all on the same day...the idea was to emphasize that this was a Parish Church, and not a private Chapel for the Chetwynd family."

From the 19th century it became a burying place for the later Chetwynd-Talbot family, the Earls of Shrewsbury & Waterford. The grave, in the churchyard south of the building, of Charles Chetwynd-Talbot, Viscount Ingestre, son of the 20th Earl, who died in 1915 serving as Captain in the Royal Horse Guards, is the only one here that is registered by the Commonwealth War Graves Commission.

== The Ingestre Festival ==
In 1957 and 1958 the Earl of Shrewsbury held a Festival of Opera at Ingestre Hall, with the ambition of turning it into a 'centre of music'.

In August 2008 and 2013 a modern Ingestre Festival was held in the grounds of Ingestre Hall.

== See also ==
- Listed buildings in Ingestre
