= John Talbot (judge) =

British judge and Whig politician (c. 1712–1756)

John Talbot (c. 1712 – 23 September 1756) was a British judge and Whig politician who sat in the House of Commons from 1734 to 1756.

Talbot was the third son of Charles Talbot, 1st Baron Talbot, and his wife Cecelia Mathews, daughter of Charles Mathews of Castell-y-Mynach. His father served as Lord Chancellor from 1733 to 1737.

Talbot was appointed Recorder of Brecon in 1734 and was also returned as Member of Parliament for Brecon, on the Tredegar interest, at the 1734 British general election. In Parliament, he voted for the Government in all recorded divisions. On 13 December 1734 he was admitted at Lincoln's Inn and was called to the bar in 1737. On 30 May 1737, he married Henrietta Decker, the daughter of Sir Matthew Decker, 1st Baronet.

In 1740 Talbot was appointed Puisne Justice of Chester for life, and was returned for Brecon at the ensuing by-election before being returned unopposed at the 1741 British general election. In 1742 he was on the court list for the ballot on members of the committee of inquiry into Walpole's Administration, to which he was one of the few Old Whigs elected. He left his post as Recorder in 1745.

Talbot was returned again unopposed for Brecon at the 1747 British general election. His wife died in September 1747. In August 1748 he married Catherine Chetwynd, daughter of John Chetwynd, 2nd Viscount Chetwynd.

After 1747, Talbot believed his seat at Brecon was no longer secure, and he suggested that the Duke of Newcastle should find him a seat elsewhere. He was proposed instead for Ilchester where his successful return cost £2,000, half of which was met from the government's secret service funds. In December 1755 he was appointed junior Lord of Trade, and was again returned at the ensuing by-election at Ilchester.

Talbot died on 23 September 1756. His first marriage was childless, but by his second wife he had four sons:

- John Chetwynd-Talbot, 1st Earl Talbot (1749–1793)
- Capt. William Henry Talbot (died 1782)
- Rev. George Talbot, in 1794 married Anne Beauclerk, daughter of Col. Lord Henry Beauclerk
- Lt-Col. Charles Talbot (died 1804)

Parliament of Great Britain
Preceded by Thomas Morgan	Member of Parliament for Brecon; 1734–1754	Succeeded by Thomas Morgan
Preceded by Francis Fane; Thomas Lockyer	Member of Parliament for Ilchester; 1754–1756; With: Thomas Lockyerr	Succeeded by Joseph Tolson Lockyer; Thomas Lockyer
Legal offices
Preceded by Richard Potenger	Puisne Justice of Chester; 1740–1756	Succeeded by Taylor White
