= Statue of Elizabeth II, Newcastle-under-Lyme =

Statue in Staffordshire, England

Coordinates: 53.012148°N 2.224861°W

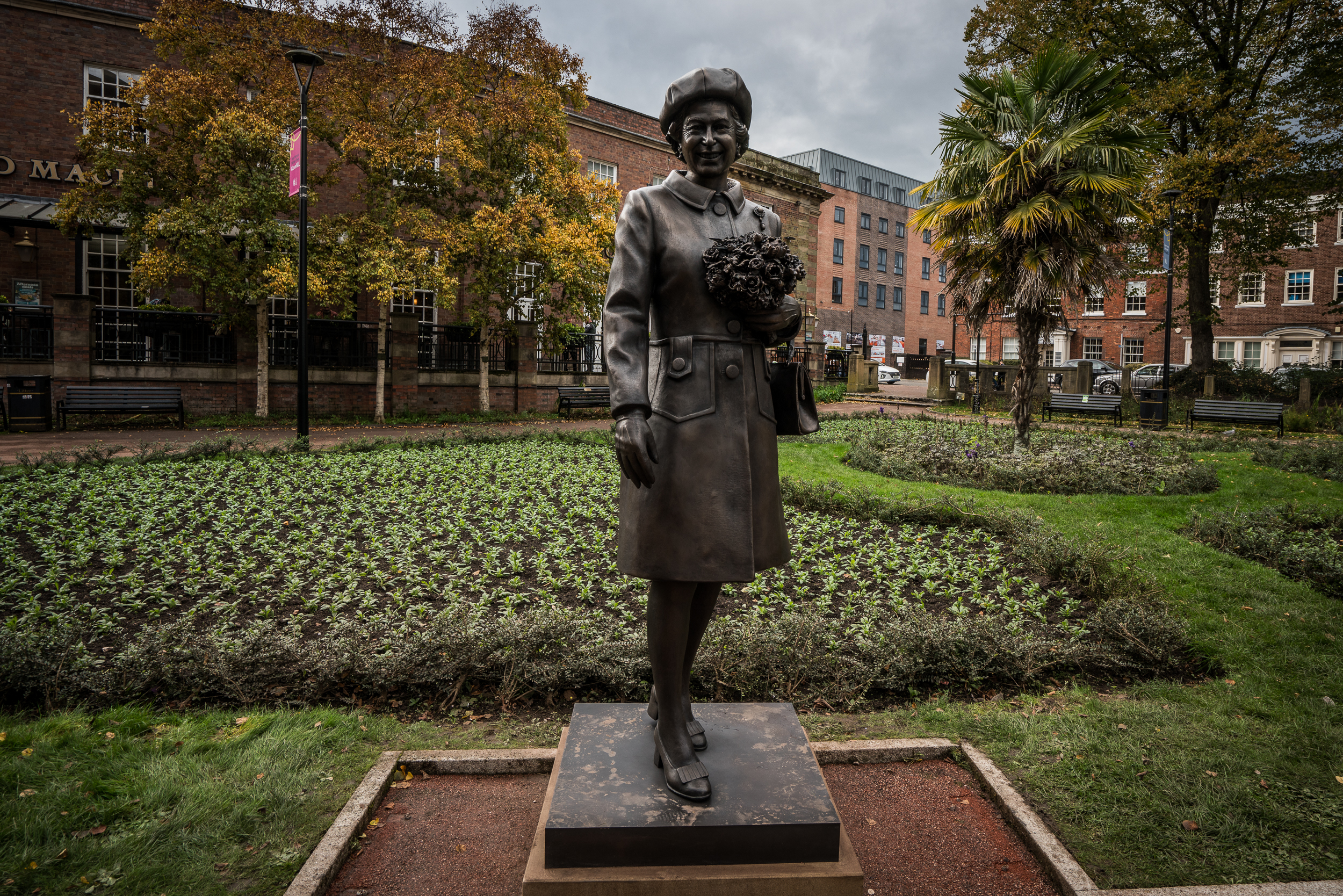

A statue of Queen Elizabeth II was unveiled in Queens Gardens in Newcastle-under-Lyme in October 2024. It was sculpted by Andy Edwards.

It is sculpted in bronze and depicts Queen Elizabeth II as she was on the day she visited Newcastle-under-Lyme on 25 May 1973 to mark its 800th anniversary. It is one-and-a-quarter times life-size. Elizabeth's clothes, hat, and shoes and posy that she carried were accurately modelled from photographs taken on the day. It was commissioned to mark the 850th anniversary of Newcastle-under-Lyme in 2023. It was unveiled on 11 October 2024 in a ceremony hosted by Barry Panter, the mayor of Newcastle-under-Lyme. Attendees included Ian Dudson, the Lord Lieutenant of Staffordshire, Tim Heatley, co-founder of Capital & Centric and Mark Turner, the CEO of JCB. Pupils from St. Giles' & St. George's CoE Academy were also present. The statue was jointly funded by Capital & Centric and JCB.
