= Dudson =

British pottery brand

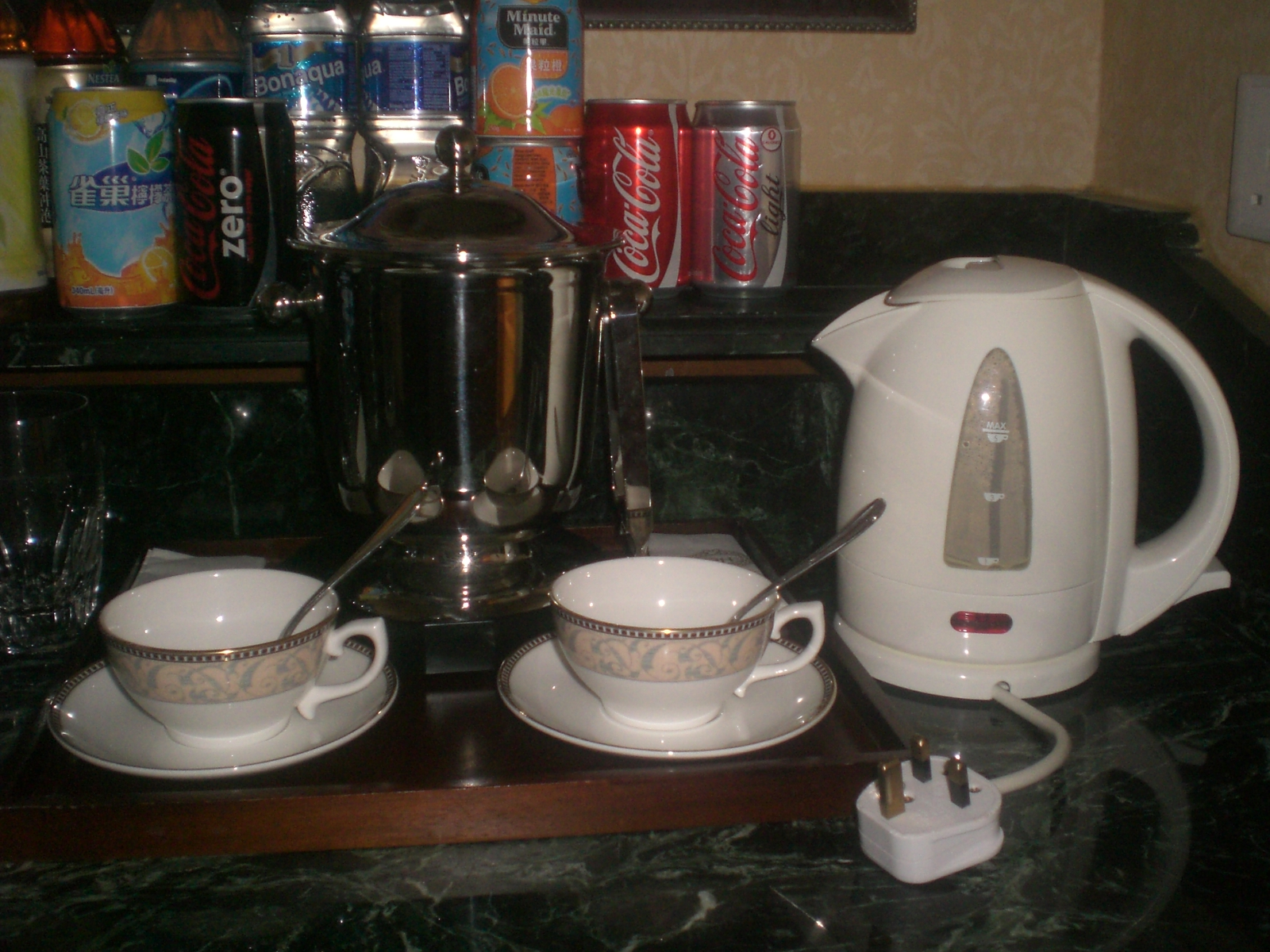
Dudson cups and saucers in a hotel in Hong Kong

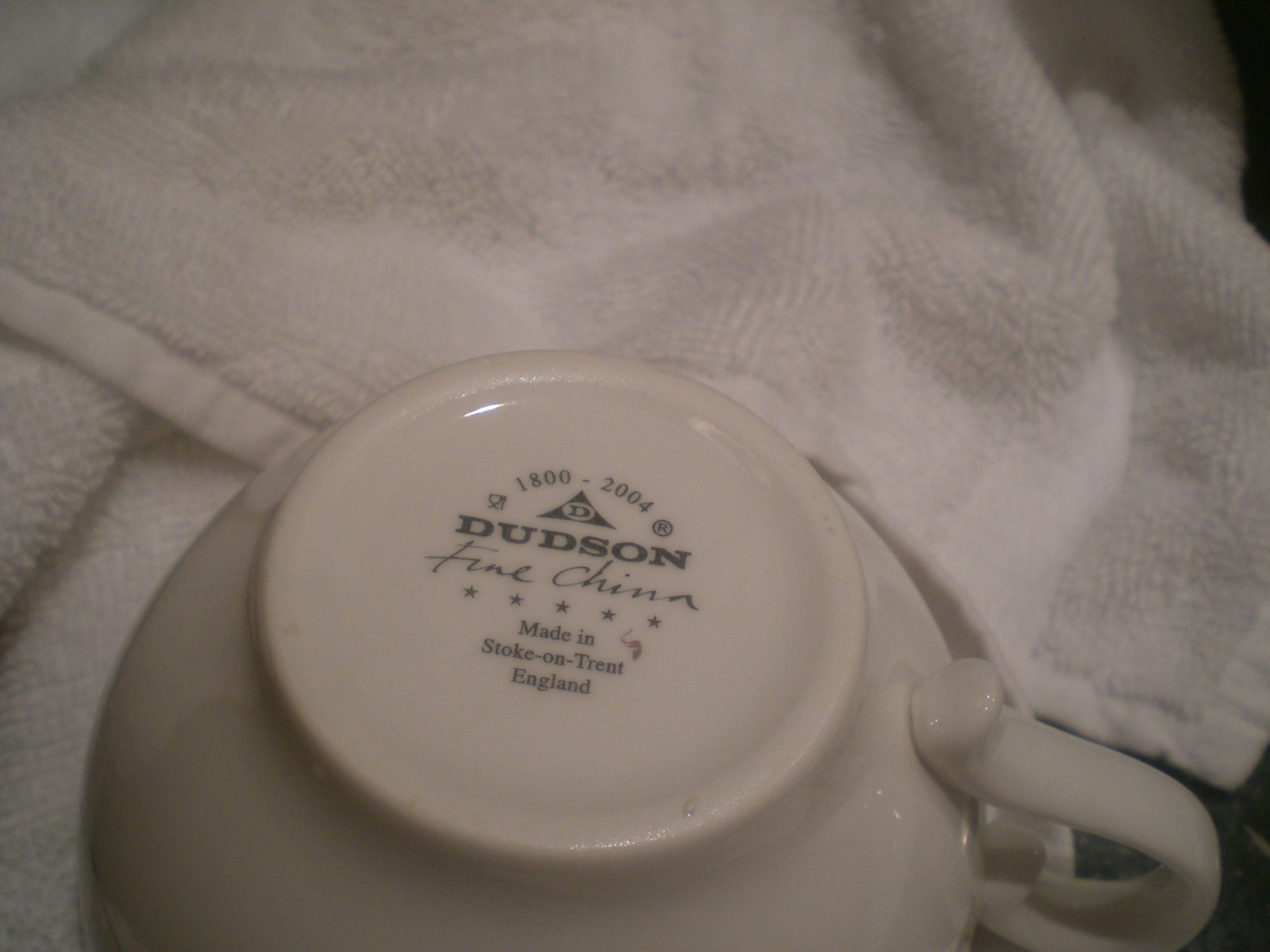
Dudson's marks

Dudson is a British company that manufactured ceramic tableware and glassware in Stoke-on-Trent. It is one of the oldest brands of its industry in England, founded in 1800.

The former pottery works is the location of the Dudson Centre and the Dudson Museum.

== History ==
The company was founded in Hanley by Richard Dudson in 1800. In its early years it produced a variety of domestic ware. In the 1880s James Thomas Dudson, great-grandson of the founder, identified a need to serve specifically the hospitality market, in view of the increase in travel created by the railways, and made significant changes in production. By 1891 the company, concentrating on this market, produced a particularly strong type of vitrified china, developed by James's father.

The company became the oldest privately owned family business in the UK tableware industry. Ian Dudson, of the Dudson family, served as the Lord Lieutenant of Staffordshire from 2012 to 2025.

=== Closure ===
Dudson went into administration on 4 April 2019. PwC cited "A deterioration in sales and increased costs" as a reason for the closure.

The local pottery company Churchill China bought the rights to the brand and two of its most popular ranges, "Harvest" and "Evo" in April 2019 and began manufacturing immediately in its own factory. On 6 June 2019 Churchill relaunched the Dudson brand with the "Harvest" and "Evo" collections already in stock.

== Dudson Centre and Museum ==
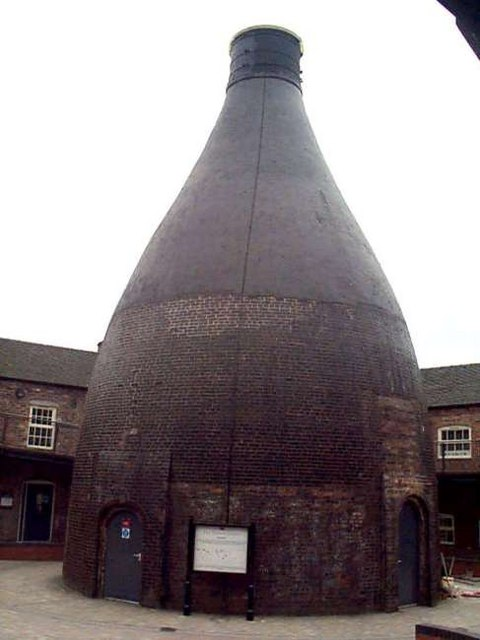
The bottle kiln in 1999

The pottery works on Hanover Street in Hanley were established in the 1820s, and were modified and expanded in later years. They are Grade II listed buildings.

The factory site is now the location of the Dudson Centre, where there are conference facilities, catering and office space for voluntary organisations.

The Dudson Museum, housed in the bottle kiln of the former factory, displays on two floors examples produced by the company. There are information boards and more than 1,300 exhibits, showing the range of products and evolving tastes during the 19th century, and innovative shapes and brightly coloured pottery for hotels and restaurant chains in more recent years.
