= Arthur Bryan =

Sir Arthur Bryan (4 March 1923 – 11 February 2011) was managing director of the Wedgwood pottery firm (now Waterford Wedgwood). He became the first non-Wedgwood family member to hold the post when he succeeded Josiah Wedgwood V in 1967. He was knighted in 1976 for services to export.

Honorary titles
| Preceded by Harold Wallace-Copeland | Lord Lieutenant of Staffordshire; 1968–1993 | Succeeded by James Appleton Hawley |
