= Henry Shirley, 3rd Earl Ferrers =

English nobleman and lunatic

Henry Shirley, 3rd Earl Ferrers (14 November 1691 – 6 August 1745), known as Hon. Henry Shirley until 1729, was an English hereditary peer and person who suffered from mental illness.

== Early life ==
Ferrers was the ninth, but second surviving, son of Robert Shirley, 1st Earl Ferrers and his wife Elizabeth Washington. His mental disorder led his younger brother, Laurence, to obtain a commission of lunacy against him. However, Ferrers' condition improved and he regained control of his estates in October 1730, the year after he succeeded his elder brother Washington in the earldom.

== Later life ==
Whilst well enough to accept the offices of Lord Lieutenant and Custos Rotulorum of Staffordshire in 1731, Ferrers again relapsed into insanity, although he was not removed from office until 1742.

== Death ==
Lord Ferrers was confined during the last years of his life and died in Kensington Gore in 1745 at the age of 53. He was succeeded in the earldom by his nephew Laurence, who would later be executed for murdering his steward.

Honorary titles
Vacant Title last held by The Earl Ferrers	Lord Lieutenant and Custos Rotulorum of Staffordshire; 1731–1742	Succeeded by The Lord Gower
Peerage of Great Britain
Preceded by Washington Shirley	Earl Ferrers; 1729–1745	Succeeded by Laurence Shirley
