= William Paget, 6th Baron Paget =

English peer and ambassador

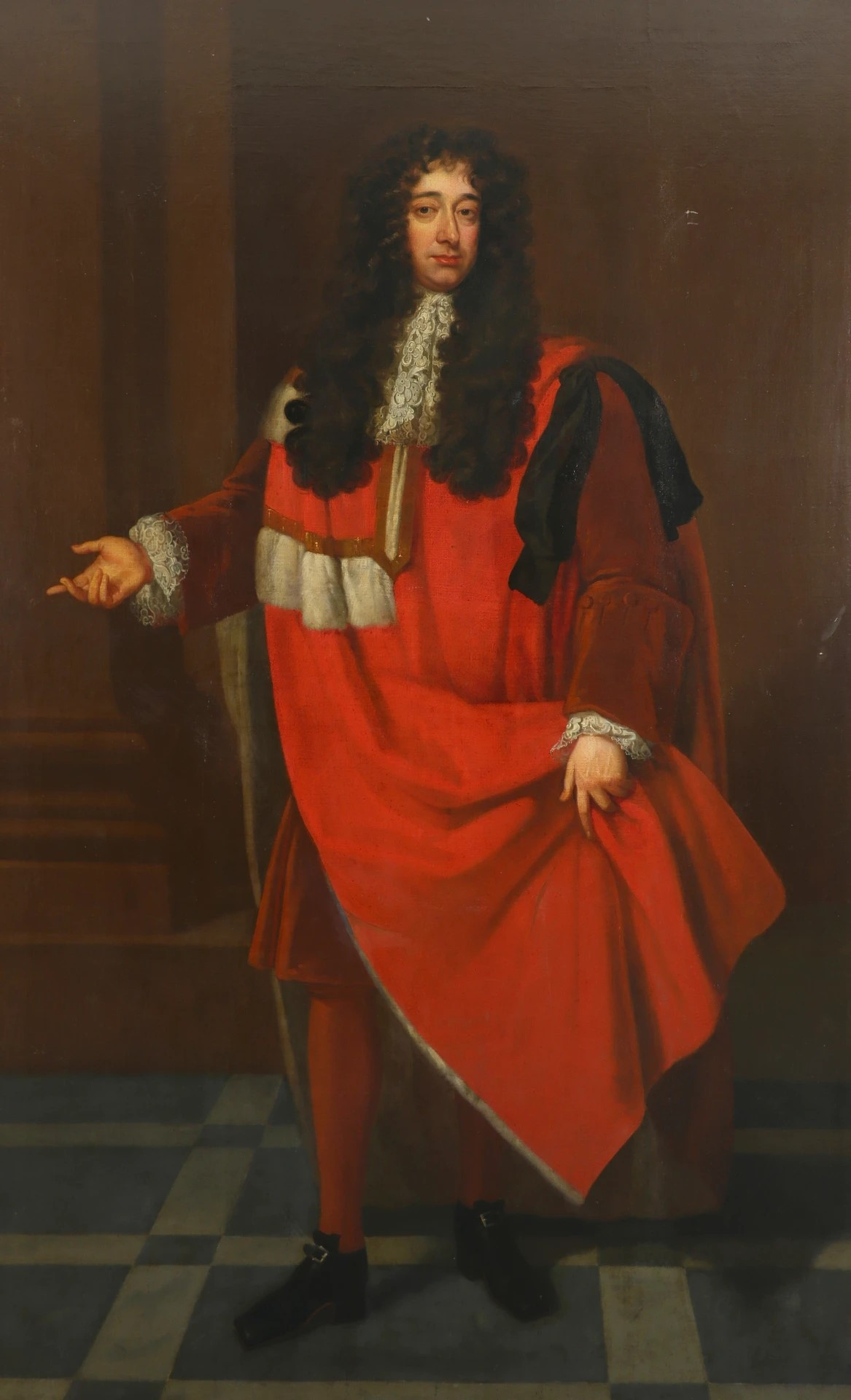
Portrait of William Paget, 6th Baron Paget, in peer's robes

William Paget, 6th Baron Paget (10 February 1637 – 26 February 1713) was an English peer and ambassador. He was the eldest son of William Paget, 5th Baron Paget and Lady Isabella Rich, daughter of Henry Rich, 1st Earl of Holland.

== Biography ==
Paget was born at Beaudesert, Staffordshire on 10 February 1637. With the death of his father on 19 October 1678 Paget took his seat in the house of Lords. Following the accession of William and Mary in 1688 he was appointed Lord Lieutenant of Staffordshire in March 1689. On 4 September 1689 Paget was appointed English ambassador to Vienna. Returning to London in 1692 he was appointed as ambassador to the Ottoman Empire at Constantinople. The Royal Instructions arrived on 5 September and he left England a week later. He travelled via Vienna, which he left on 12 December, arriving at Adrianople on 30 January 1693. He finally reached Constantinople in July.

Paget was joint chairman at the congress of Karlowitz from 2 November 1698 to 26 January 1699 which resulted in the Treaty of Karlowitz between the Ottomans and the Holy League, ending the 15 year Great Turkish War.

Paget remained at the Porte for nearly four more years. His cousin, the poet Aaron Hill, visited him in Constantinople. He was finally brought home in May 1702. Arriving back in London in April 1703 he was reappointed Lord Lieutenant of Staffordshire on 24 June 1703.

Paget owned considerable estates in Staffordshire, particularly around Burton on Trent. In 1699, he obtained an Act of Parliament to extend navigation on the River Trent from Nottingham up to Burton, but nothing was immediately done. In 1711, Lord Paget leased his rights to George Hayne, who carried out improvements, quickly opening the river to Burton and stimulating the export of Burton Ale.

Lord Paget married twice, firstly to Frances Pierrepont, daughter of Francis Pierrepont and Elizabeth Bray, by whom he had a son and heir Henry Paget, 1st Earl of Uxbridge. He married secondly his cousin Isabella Irby, daughter of Sir Anthony Irby and Paget's aunt Catherine Paget. William Paget died at his London home on 26 February 1713 and was buried in the church of St Giles in the Fields on 20 March 1713.

Diplomatic posts
Preceded by ?	British ambassador to the Austria; 1689–1692	Succeeded by ?
Preceded by Sir William Harbord	British ambassador to the Ottoman Empire; 1692–1701	Succeeded by Sir Robert Sutton
Honorary titles
Preceded by The Lord Aston of Forfar	Lord Lieutenant and Custos Rotulorum of Staffordshire; 1689–1713	Succeeded by The Lord Paget
Peerage of England
Preceded by William Paget	Baron Paget; 1678–1713	Succeeded by Henry Paget
