= Robert Shirley, 1st Earl Ferrers =

English peer and courtier

The Right Honourable Robert Shirley
- 1st Earl Ferrers
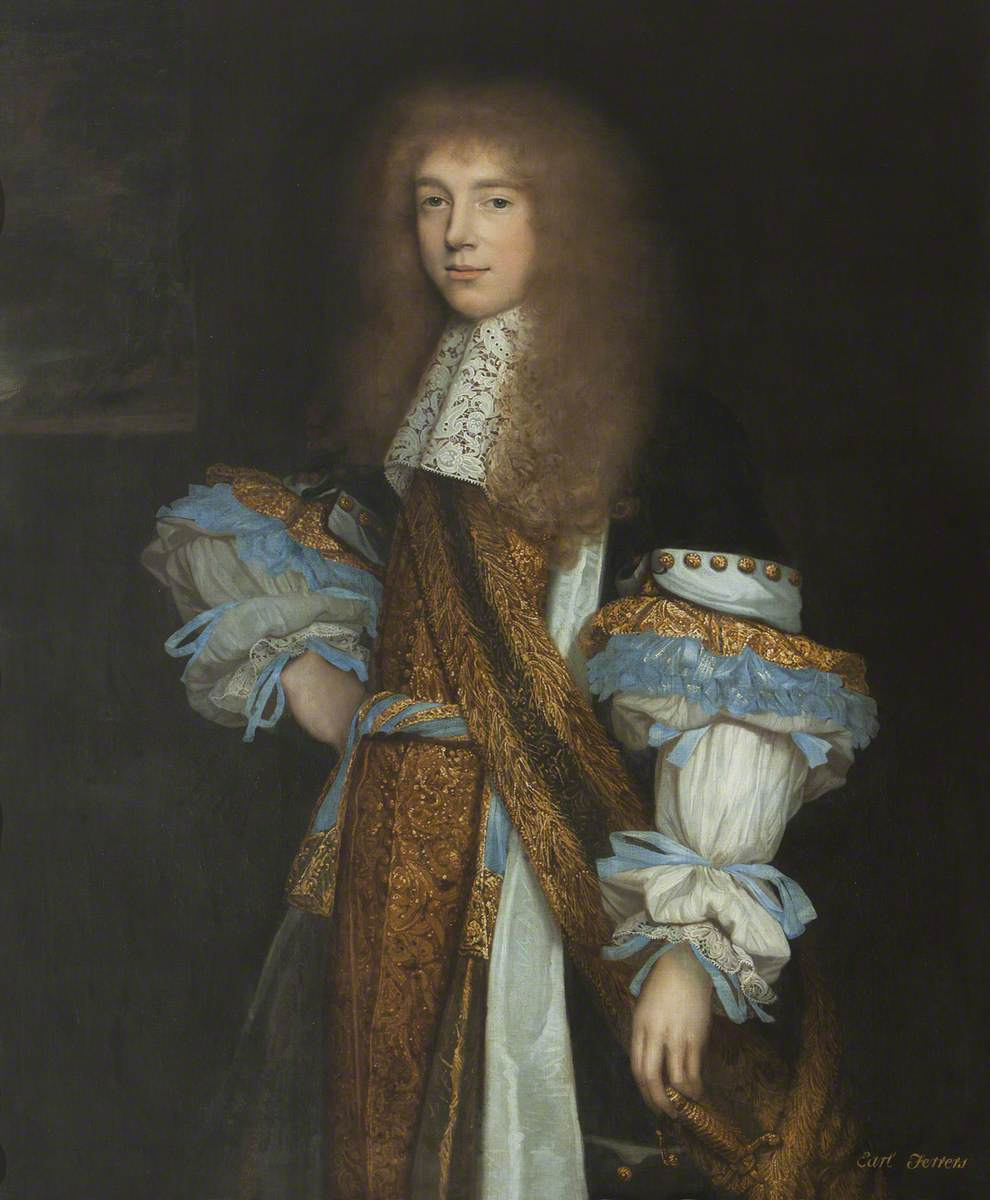

- Coat of arms
- Tenure: 1711–1717 (as Earl Ferrers); 1677–1717 (as Baron Ferrers of Chartley); 1669–1717 (as Baronet Shirley of Staunton Harold)
- Predecessor: New creation (Earl Ferrers); Robert Devereux, 13th Baron Ferrers of Chartley (Baron Ferrers of Chartley); Sir Robert Shirley (Baronet Shirley of Staunton Harold)
- Successor: Washington Shirley (as Earl Ferrers and Baronet Shirley of Staunton Harold); Elizabeth Compton (as 15th Baroness Ferrers of Chartley)
- Other titles: 14th Baron Ferrers of Chartley; 7th Baronet Shirley of Staunton Harold
- Born: 20 October 1650; East Sheen
- Died: 25 December 1717 (aged 67); Bath, Somerset
- Issue: With Elizabeth Washington: Hon. Robert Shirley; Elizabeth Shirley; Hon. Katherine Shirley; Washington Shirley, 2nd Earl Ferrers; Lady Elizabeth Shirley; Lady Anne Eleanora Shirley; Lady Katherine Shirley; Hon. Charles Shirley; Lady Dorothy Shirley; Hon. Charles Shirley; Hon. Lewis Shirley; Hon. George Shirley; Lady Barbara Shirley; Hon. Ferrers Shirley; Hon. Walter Shirley; Henry Shirley, 3rd Earl Ferrers; Hon. Laurence Shirley; With Selina Finch: Hon. Robert Shirley; Lady Selina Shirley; Lady Mary Shirley; Hon. George Shirley; Capt. Hon. George Shirley; Lady Frances Shirley; Lady Anne Shirley; Hon. Sewallis Shirley; Lady Stuarta Shirley; Hon. John Shirley

Robert Shirley, 1st Earl Ferrers PC (20 October 1650 – 25 December 1717)—known as Sir Robert Shirley, 7th Baronet, from 1669 to 1677 and Robert Shirley, 14th Baron Ferrers of Chartley, from 1677 to 1711—was an English peer and courtier.

Shirley was born at East Sheen, the third son of Sir Robert Shirley, 4th Baronet and his wife Catherine Okeover. He was educated at Christ Church, Oxford. In March 1669, he inherited his baronetcy from his infant nephew, and received an M.A. from Oxford in 1669. Shirley was suggested as a candidate for Lichfield in 1677 by Thomas Thynne, husband of his second cousin Frances, but he preferred to accept a seat in the House of Lords, the barony of Ferrers of Chartley being called out of abeyance for him in December. He was also appointed a deputy lieutenant of Staffordshire shortly thereafter. In 1683, he was appointed high steward of Stafford, replacing the Duke of Monmouth.

On 18 February 1684, Lord Ferrers was appointed Master of the Horse to the Queen Consort, Catherine of Braganza. After Charles II's death in 1685, he became the Dowager Queen's Lord Steward and "Chief Bailiff of the Revenues", in which post he served until her death in 1705. Among the Queen's property was the honour of Higham Ferrers, part of the Duchy of Lancaster, which had been granted to her for life by Charles II with reversion to the Earl of Feversham, her Lord Chamberlain. Since Feversham avoided open politics after the Glorious Revolution in 1689, the offices of the honour were in Ferrers' gift. This allowed him to choose the Member of Parliament for Higham Ferrers until 1703, when Thomas Watson-Wentworth, whose brother had married Feversham's sister-in-law, purchased from him the reversion of the honour of Higham Ferrers and took over the electoral interest.

At the coronation of King James II in April, Ferrers was assistant lord cupbearer. He was also the first colonel of The Princess Anne of Denmark's Regiment of Foot, raised in the summer of 1685, during the Monmouth Rebellion, but was removed in favor of James FitzJames, 1st Duke of Berwick on 1 November 1686. In September 1687, he was appointed Lord Lieutenant of Staffordshire, replacing the Earl of Shrewsbury, who was unwilling to comply with James II's orders for purging the commission of the peace and packing Parliament with royalist candidates (to secure the repeal of the Test Act and the Penal Laws). However, Ferrers proved no more tractable, and was replaced in November by Walter Aston, 3rd Lord Aston of Forfar. He was also dismissed from the high stewardship of Stafford in February 1688.

In December 1688, after the outbreak of the Glorious Revolution, Ferrers, Lord Chesterfield, and a retinue of gentlemen attended Princess Anne in Nottingham and escorted her to Warwick. Under William III and Mary II, Ferrers was re-appointed as high steward of Stafford.

In 1692, Ferrers and Thynne (the latter now Viscount Weymouth) decided to partition the Barony of Farney in County Monaghan, both possessing an equal moiety of it as coheirs of Robert Devereux, 3rd Earl of Essex. The barony was surveyed and divided into lands of equal value, Weymouth taking the eastern moiety and Ferrers the western. However, the survey soon proved to be faulty, and Ferrers' share of lesser value. Weymouth generously deeded a portion of his share to Ferrers to equalize them, a process completed in 1706.

Ferrers was admitted to the Privy Council on 25 May 1699. He was retained in the Privy Council of Queen Anne, and was again assistant lord cupbearer at her coronation. John Macky described him during her reign:

Is a very honest Man, a Lover of his Country, a great Improver of Gardening and Parking; a keen Sportsman, never was yet in Business, but is very capable; a tall, fair Man, towards sixty Years old.

After his second marriage to Selina Finch in 1699, he spent much of his time at a house he built in Twickenham, Heath Lane Lodge. On 3 September 1711, Lord Ferrers was created Earl Ferrers and Viscount Tamworth. On his death at Bath six years later, his earldom passed to his second (but eldest surviving) son Washington, whilst his barony passed to his granddaughter, Elizabeth, her father and elder brother having died in 1698 and 1714, respectively. Washington received the family's Northamptonshire estates in fee simple, while those in Derbyshire, Nottinghamshire, Leicestershire, and Staffordshire were to some extent encumbered by annuities to his four younger half-brothers and a jointure to the Dowager Countess Selina. She also received Heath Lane Lodge, which was then to go to her eldest son; he also inherited the Ettington Park estate near Stratford-on-Avon in Warwickshire, and he and his three full brothers were jointly left the Earl's Irish lands in County Monaghan. The estate of Garsdon in Wiltshire, inherited from the Washingtons, went to the Earl's third surviving son, Laurence.

== Family ==
On 28 December 1671, Shirley married the heiress, Elizabeth Washington (d. 2 October 1693) and they had ten sons and seven daughters:

- Hon. Robert Shirley (1673 – 1698 or 1699)
- Elizabeth Shirley (25 November 1674 – 10 October 1677), died three months before her father ascended to the peerage and so was the only one of her siblings not to receive a courtesy title
- Hon. Katherine Shirley (31 May 1676 – 18 August 1679), died before her father became an Earl and so never received the title of Lady
- Washington Shirley, 2nd Earl Ferrers (1677–1729)
- Lady Elizabeth Shirley (20 June 1678 – 7 March 1740), married Walter Clarges (d. 1723), younger son of Sir Walter Clarges, 1st Baronet.
- Lady Anne Eleanora Shirley (12 November 1679 – 1754)
- Lady Katherine Shirley (17 February 1680 – October 1736), unmarried
- Hon. Charles Shirley (9 April 1682 – 28 May 1682)
- Lady Dorothy Shirley (25 May 1683 – 3 April 1721), married John Cotes in 1700
- Hon. Charles Shirley (21 June 1684 – 12 September 1685)
- Hon. Lewis Shirley (13 July 1685 – 1710), unmarried
- Hon. George Shirley (21 October 1686 – 1694)
- Lady Barbara Shirley (5 February 1687 – 7 November 1768), unmarried
- Hon. Ferrers Shirley (23 April 1689 – 25 June 1707)
- Hon. Walter Shirley (27 May 1690 – aft. 1694; died young)
- Henry Shirley, 3rd Earl Ferrers (1691–1745)
- Hon. Laurence Shirley (26 September 1693 – 1743), married Anne Clarges, daughter of Sir Walter Clarges, 1st Baronet, and had issue, including:
  - Laurence Shirley, 4th Earl Ferrers (1720–1760)
  - V-Adm. Washington Shirley, 5th Earl Ferrers (1722–1778)
  - Robert Shirley, 6th Earl Ferrers (1723–1787)
  - Rev. Walter Shirley (1726–1786)
  - R-Adm. Thomas Shirley (1733–1814)

In August 1699, Lord Ferrers married Selina Finch (d. 20 March 1762) and they had ten children:

- Hon. Robert Shirley (1700–1738)
- Lady Selina Shirley (2 July 1701 – 14 December 1777), married Peter Bathurst
- Lady Mary Shirley (20 November 1702 – 17 May 1771), married Charles Tryon, of Bulwick, and had issue, including William Tryon
- Hon. George Shirley (1704–1704)
- Capt. Hon. George Shirley (23 October 1705 – 22 October 1787), married Mary Sturt, sister of Humphrey Sturt, and had issue. They are ancestors of Downton Abbey creator Julian Fellowes.
- Lady Frances Shirley (5 May 1707 – 15 July 1778), unmarried
- Lady Anne Shirley (24 May 1708 – 6 February 1779), married Sir Robert Furnese, 2nd Baronet
- Hon. Sewallis Shirley (1709–1765), married Margaret Rolle, 15th Baroness Clinton (1709–1781)
- Lady Stuarta Shirley (19 August 1711 – 31 December 1767), unmarried
- Hon. John Shirley (12 March 1712 O.S. – 15 February 1768), unmarried

Military offices
New regiment	Colonel of The Princess Anne of Denmark's Regiment of Foot; 1685–1686	Succeeded by The Duke of Berwick
Honorary titles
Preceded by The Duke of Shrewsbury	Lord Lieutenant of Staffordshire; 1687	Succeeded by The Lord Aston of Forfar
Peerage of Great Britain
New creation	Earl Ferrers; 1711–1717	Succeeded by Washington Shirley
Peerage of England
In abeyance Title last held by Robert Devereux	Baron Ferrers of Chartley; 1677–1717	Succeeded by Elizabeth Compton
Baronetage of England
Preceded by Robert Shirley	Baronet (of Staunton Harold); 1669–1717	Succeeded by Washington Shirley
