= Tim Heatley =

British property developer (born 1980)

- Born: 1980 (age 45–46); Eccles, Salford, Greater Manchester
- Occupation: Property developer

Tim Heatley (born 1980) is a British property developer and co-founder of Capital & Centric.

== Background ==
Heatley was born and grew up in Eccles, Salford. He studied law at Manchester Metropolitan University. While studying at university, he began selling art and restoring cars. He used this money to buy and redevelop his first property after graduating from university.

== Career ==
Heatley co-founded Capital & Centric with Adam Higgins in November 2011 by combining their businesses. Heatley became associated with a number of the company's developments in Greater Manchester. In 2020, the company's Kampus development in Manchester City Centre received a national placemaking award. The same year, Business Insider ranked the co-founders 87 in its 2020 Power 100 list.

In 2020, Heatley appeared in the BBC2 documentary series, Manctopia: Billion Pound Property Boom. The series examined Manchester's property boom from the perspectives of developers, residents and people affected by changes in the city's housing market.

Heatley's real estate firm, while providing affordable housing solutions, is involved in multiple projects which do not provide affordable housing as well. His proposals and planning regarding converting and developing old buildings and mills has witnessed mixed receptions, where certain groups of citizens believed that such initiatives would actually solve the basic problem of housing within Manchester, whereas some are apprehensive about their old neighborhoods becoming gentrified.

Heatley has faced questions around the shortage of affordable housing across Manchester and the company's record of delivering new affordable homes as part of its developments. The Guardian reported on the use of financial viability assessments in Manchester developments, including projects involving Capital & Centric, while The Times covered the provision of affordable housing within some of the company's developments. Heatley has discussed the factors affecting affordable housing in city-centre developments, including land values, development costs and the financial viability of individual projects.

In 2017, Heatley and Higgins were in the news for the policy driven sale of flats at their Crusader Mill development in Manchester only to local owner occupiers while banning any foreign investors.

== Charitable work ==
Heatley is the current chair of the Greater Manchester Mayor's Charity that supports programmes around rough sleeping and homelessness. During the COVID-19 pandemic, he was a part of an initiative in establishing a food and supplies depot in Manchester to support the homeless and rough sleepers in partnership with Capital & Centric.

He has also been involved with the Regeneration Brainery initiative, a mentoring project that aims to support young people from a range of backgrounds to take up careers in the property and development sector. He was involved in the development of Embassy Bus initiative with Stockport-based charity, Embassy, which converted a former luxury tour bus into temporary accommodation for the homeless in Greater Manchester.

== See also ==
- Capital & Centric
- Manchester City Centre
