= John Leveson-Gower, 1st Earl Gower =

British politician (1694–1752)

The Right Honourable The Earl Gower PC
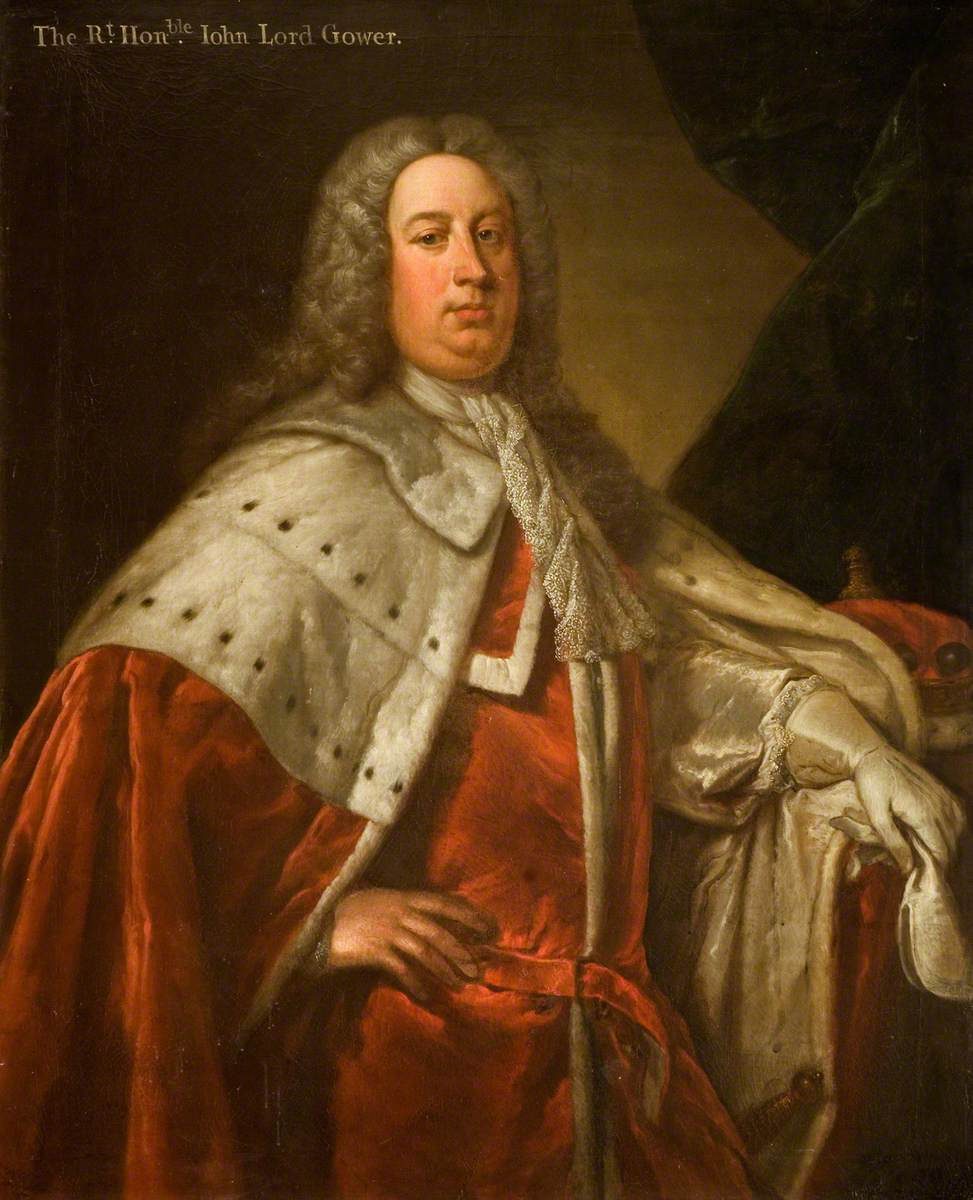
- Portrait attributed to Thomas Hudson, c. 1750

Lord Privy Seal
- In office 1742–1743
- Monarch: George II
- Preceded by: The Lord Hervey
- Succeeded by: The Earl of Cholmondeley

Lord Privy Seal
- In office 1744–1754
- Monarch: George II
- Preceded by: The Earl of Cholmondeley
- Succeeded by: The Duke of Marlborough

Personal details
- Born: 10 August 1694 London, England
- Died: 25 December 1754 (aged 60) London, England
- Spouse(s): Lady Evelyn Pierrepont (m. 1712); Penelope Stonhouse (m. 1733); Lady Mary Tufton (m. 1736)
- Children: 14, including Granville, Gertrude, Richard and John
- Parent(s): John Leveson-Gower, 1st Baron Gower; Lady Catherine Manners

John Leveson-Gower, 1st Earl Gower, PC (10 August 1694 – 25 December 1754) was a British Tory politician who served as Lord Privy Seal from 1742 to 1743 and again from 1744 to 1754. Leveson-Gower also served in the Parliament of Great Britain, where he sat in the House of Lords as a leading member of the Tories, prior to switching his political affiliation and serving in various Whig-led government ministries until his death in 1754.

Born in London into the prominent Leveson-Gower family, Leveson-Gower was educated at Westminster School and the University of Oxford. After his father died in 1709, he assumed his peerage as Baron Gower and before taking his seat in the House of Lords. Leveson-Gower proceeded to acquire a political power base consisting of four parliamentary boroughs under his de facto control: Newcastle-under-Lyme, Stafford, Lichfield, and Cheadle.

In 1742, Leveson-Gower started serving in the Carteret ministry as Lord Privy Seal. Though he resigned the next year, in 1744 Leveson-Gower again served in the same position as part of the Whig-led Broad Bottom ministry. He soon became a devoted supporter of Henry Pelham and his brother the Duke of Newcastle. During the Jacobite rising of 1745, he remained loyal to the Hanoverians, which led George II to grant him the title of Earl Gower.

During the 1747 British general election, seven parliamentary constituencies which were under Leveson-Gower's control were contested by rival Tory candidates. Despite spending large sums of money from his vast financial estate, he only managed to retain two constituencies, Stafford and Lichfield. Leveson-Gower subsequently twice rejected calls to resign in 1751 and 1754, before dying in office on 25 December 1754 at his London townhouse.

== Early life ==
John Leveson-Gower was born on 10 August 1694 in London, England into the aristocratic Leveson-Gower family. His father was John Leveson-Gower, a politician who sat in the House of Commons until he was elevated to the English peerage in 1703 as the Baron Gower; he also served as the Chancellor of the Duchy of Lancaster. Leveson-Gower's mother was Lady Catherine Manners, the eldest daughter of the 1st Duke of Rutland.

Leveson-Gower was educated at Westminster School before graduating from Christ Church, Oxford after entering the college in 1710. During his youth, though he was a Jacobite sympathiser, Leveson-Gower remained uninvolved in politics, being more interested in fox hunting and horse racing. However, beginning in 1720 he turned his attention to political affairs, making efforts to bring parliamentary seats in Staffordshire under his control.

By the late 1720s, Leveson-Gower had managed to secure a base of parliamentary support, which consisted of four constituencies: Newcastle-under-Lyme, Stafford, Lichfield and Cheadle (he served as the town mayor of Cheadle in 1721). After Leveson-Gower's father died in 1709, Leveson-Gower inherited his peerage and soon took his seat in the British House of Lords, eventually emerging as a leading figure in the Tory faction.

== Political career ==
In 1740, Leveson-Gower was appointed as a Lord Justice; after the Tory-led Walpole ministry collapsed in 1742, he was appointed to the position of Lord Privy Seal, succeeding John Hervey, 2nd Baron Hervey and being the lone Tory politician to be promoted to such high office after the collapse. He was also appointed to the Privy Council of Great Britain on 12 May 1742 by the Carteret ministry, which was a Whig-dominated administration.

Leveson-Gower's alliance with a rival political party, described by historians as "a move of considerable party political importance", soon collapsed as he resigned from his position on December 1743. However, he was reappointed as Lord Privy Seal in 1744 as part of the Broad Bottom ministry, a coalition government led by Henry Pelham and his brother Thomas Pelham-Holles, 1st Duke of Newcastle, which stayed in power for a decade.

When the Jacobite rising of 1745 broke out, Leveson-Gower personally assured George II of Great Britain of his loyalty, raising the 77th Foot, one of the fifteen new British military regiments formed to oppose the Jacobite invasion of England; in recognition of these actions, he was granted the titles of Viscount Trentham and Earl Gower by George II on 8 July 1746. However, Leveson-Gower's regiment proved unwilling to face any possibility of fighting, refusing to move beyond the nearest tavern when his son-in-law Sir Richard Wrottesley, 7th Baronet raised a Yeomanry unit and joined them. In 1746, he was ousted and replaced as president of the High Tory Loyal Brotherhood by Charles Noel Somerset.

In 1748, he was again appointed as a Lord Justice, being appointed again in 1750 and 1752. Leveson-Gower's continuing support of a Whig-led ministry led to increasing backlash amongst his fellow Tories and English Jacobites, who perceived John Russell, 4th Duke of Bedford as having "corrupted" him; in a letter to the 4th Duke of Bedford, Leveson-Gower complained that he was being "persecuted by the gout and Jacobitism". In 1747, a protest by a group of English Jacobites at the Lichfield horse races forced Leveson-Gower to refrain from leaving his house for a time.

Despite mounting levels of public and private criticism, he refused to resign from his position as Lord Privy Seal, an action which led English lexicographer and prominent Tory Dr. Samuel Johnson to include Leveson-Gower in his seminal 1755 work A Dictionary of the English Language under the definition of renegado, though this was later removed by Johnson's printer. By the early 1750s, Leveson-Gower had solidified his political loyalty to the Pelham brothers, joining a group of British parliamentarians (dominated by members of the Whig party) known as the "Pelhamites".

== Later life and death ==
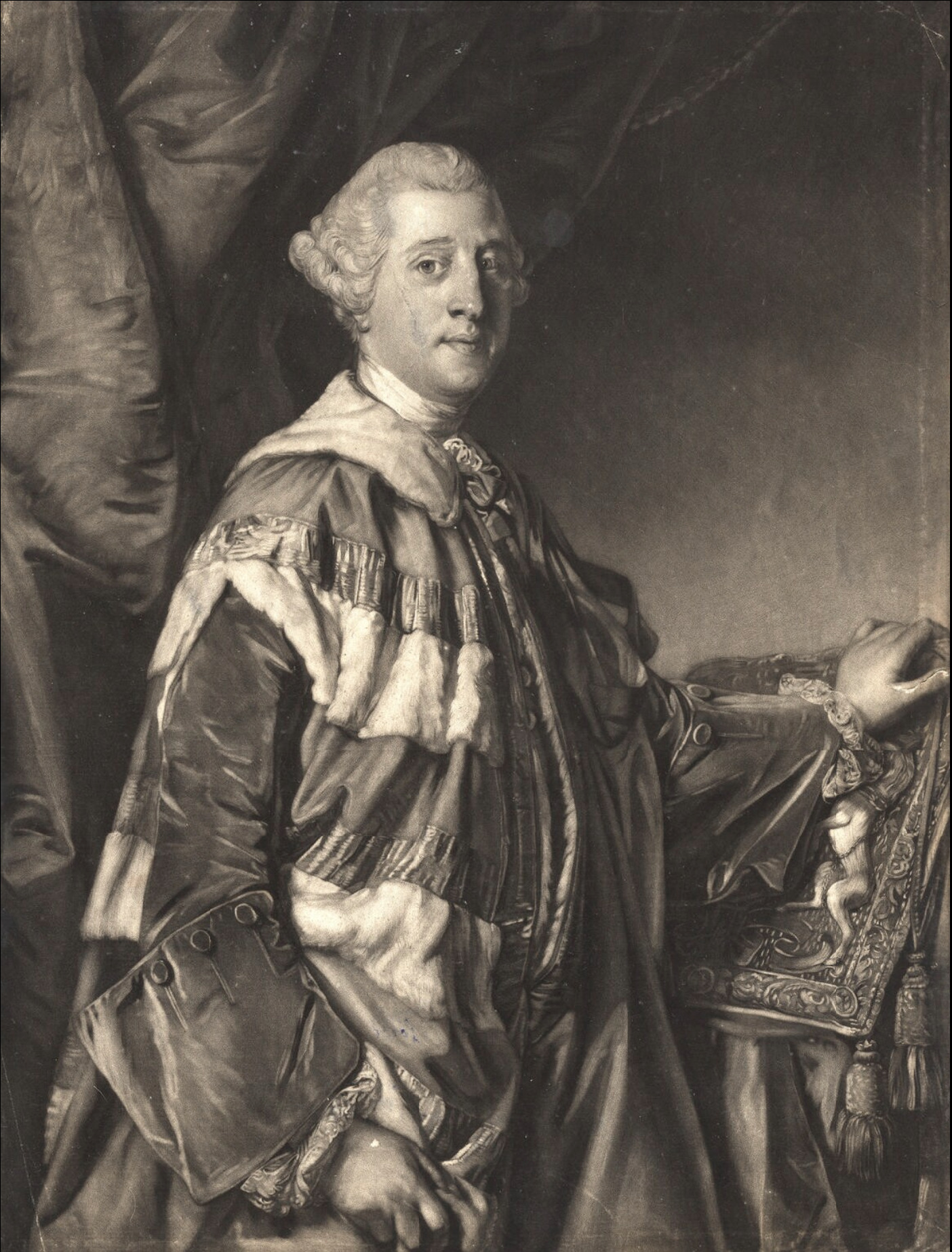
A portrait of Granville Leveson-Gower, 1st Marquess of Stafford

During the 1747 British general election, Leveson-Gower's parliamentary support base, which included seven constituencies in Staffordshire and Westminster, came under heavy threat by rival political candidates. Though he had succeeded to the position of Lord Lieutenant of Staffordshire in 1742, which gave him a large advantage in determining the outcome of parliamentary elections, all seven constituencies were contested by Tory politicians with extensive backing.

Despite suffering from gout, Leveson-Gower chose to defend his support base, focusing on the constituencies of Stafford and Lichfield; this was despite the fact that, as George Anson noted in a letter to the 4th Duke of Bedford, "everything has been done that could be thought of against Lord Gower's interest". Leveson-Gower complained that he was being opposed in the elections "by... men that I have lived in the strictest friendship with the best part of my life".

When the results of the elections were announced, Leveson-Gower discovered that, despite his extensive campaigning efforts, he had lost five out of the seven constituencies of his support base; the two he had retained, Stafford and Lichfield, were due in Henry Pelham's opinion "almost entirely to the Whigs". According to Wisker, the "considerable" cost of campaigning during the general election sapped a significant portion of Leveson-Gower's financial estate.

In June 1751, Leveson-Gower refused to join his third son Granville (by now a member of parliament) and the 4th Duke of Bedford in resigning from their positions as a show of support to John Montagu, 4th Earl of Sandwich, who had been dismissed from his position as First Lord of the Admiralty by the 1st Duke of Newcastle. When Henry Pelham died in March 1754, leading to the Broad Bottom ministry's collapse, he again refused to resign from his position.

On 25 December 1754, he died at his London townhouse at 6 Upper Brook Street. After his death, Leveson-Gower's titles were inherited by Granville, while his position as Lord Privy Seal was succeeded by Charles Spencer, 3rd Duke of Marlborough. His death was recorded in a letter written by English writer, bluestocking and artist Mary Delany on 28 December, who noted, as per mourning customs, that women who mourned Leveson-Gower's passing wore only grey or white clothing for a week.

== Estates ==
Leveson-Gower inherited Trentham Estate after his father's death. In 1730, he erected Trentham Hall, an English country house, on the property, basing it on the design of Buckingham House. His son Granville would later substantially alter it based on designs supplied by architect Henry Holland from 1775 to 1778. It was further altered from 1833 to 1842 by George Sutherland-Leveson-Gower, 2nd Duke of Sutherland, who employed Sir Charles Barry to carry out the renovations.

Leveson-Gower's political career was supported by his vast personal estate, which partially consisted of investments in Britain's rapidly growing industrial production sector and ownership of shares in eight other estates, including those of fellow British peers Willem van Keppel, 2nd Earl of Albemarle and William Pulteney, 1st Earl of Bath. However, the sizeable costs of electoral campaigning combined with family expenses took a heavy toll on his estate, and by Leveson-Gower's death in 1754, he owed outstanding debts to the tune of £37,861 along with roughly £36,000 in legacies (equivalent to £6,641,000 in 2025).

== Marriages and issue ==
Over the course of his life, Leveson-Gower married thrice. On 13 March 1712, he married Lady Evelyn Pierrepont, the third daughter of Evelyn Pierrepont, 1st Duke of Kingston-upon-Hull. She died on 26 June 1727, weeks after the birth of their twelfth child:

- Hon. John (27 November 1712 – 15 July 1723)
- Hon. Catharine (bapt. 15 March 1714), died as infant
- Lady Gertrude (1715–1794), married the 4th Duke of Bedford
- Hon. William (17 February 1716 – 14 April 1739)
- Lady Mary (30 October 1718 – 1 May 1778), married Rev. Sir Richard Wrottesley, 7th Baronet
- Hon. Granville (1721–1803), succeeded as 2nd Earl Gower; served as Lord Privy Seal (1755–1757). He would go on to be granted the title of Marquess of Stafford in 1786 by King George III and serve as a leading Tory politician.
- Hon. Jane (died May 1737)
- Lady Frances (12 August 1720 – 26 June 1788), married Lord John Sackville
- Lady Elizabeth (20 January 1723 – 28 April 1784) married John Waldegrave, 3rd Earl Waldegrave
- Lady Evelyn (26 January 1725 – 14 April 1763), married firstly in 1744 John FitzPatrick, 1st Earl of Upper Ossory; married secondly in 1759 Richard Vernon
- Hon. Richard (1726–1753), MP for Lichfield
- Hon. Diana (31 May 1727 – 9 October 1727), died as infant

After her death, Leveson-Gower remarried on 31 October 1733 to Penelope Stonhouse, daughter of Sir John Stonhouse, 3rd Baronet and widow of Sir Henry Atkins, Baronet (1707–1728). Through her daughter by her first husband, she was the grandmother of Penelope Ligonier. They had one daughter, but his wife died soon after on 19 August 1734, aged 27.

- Hon. Penelope (bapt. 17 May 1734 – 3 April 1743), died in childhood

Leveson-Gower's third and last wife was Mary, Countess of Harold (née Lady Mary Tufton), whom he married on 16 May 1736. They had three sons and a daughter, with only one son surviving to adulthood:

- Hon. Catherine (bapt. 4 May 1737 – 26 February 1742), died in childhood
- Hon. Thomas (bapt. 20 August 1738 – 3 December 1743), died in childhood
- John Leveson-Gower (1740–1792); served in the Royal Navy and participated in several naval battles with the French Navy during the American War of Independence before entering Parliament and sitting in the House of Commons until his death in 1792.

The Countess of Gower survived his death and died on 9 February 1785.

Political offices
Preceded by The Lord Hervey	Lord Privy Seal; 1742–1743	Succeeded by The Earl of Cholmondeley
Preceded by The Earl of Cholmondeley	Lord Privy Seal; 1744–1754	Succeeded by The Duke of Marlborough
Honorary titles
Preceded by The Earl Ferrers	Lord Lieutenant of Staffordshire; 1742–1754	Succeeded by The Earl Gower
Preceded by The Earl Ferrers	Custos Rotulorum of Staffordshire; 1742–1754	Succeeded by The Earl Gower
Peerage of Great Britain
New creation	Earl Gower; 1746–1754	Succeeded by Granville Leveson-Gower
New creation	Viscount Trentham; 1746–1754	Succeeded by Granville Leveson-Gower
Peerage of England
Preceded by John Leveson-Gower	Baron Gower; 1709–1754	Succeeded by Granville Leveson-Gower
Baronetage of England
Preceded by John Leveson-Gower	Baronet (of Sittersham); 1709–1754	Succeeded by Granville Leveson-Gower
