= Robert Devereux, 3rd Earl of Essex =

English Parliamentarian and soldier (1591–1646)

The Right Honourable The Earl of Essex KB PC
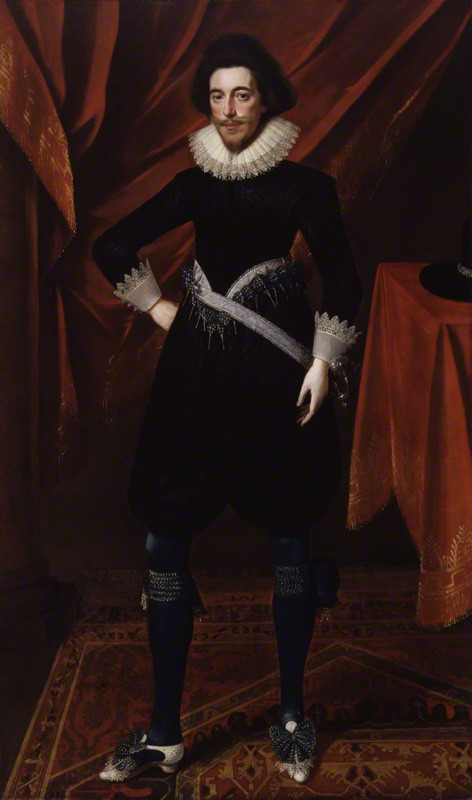
- Portrait of Robert Devereux 3rd Earl of Essex
- Born: 11 January 1591
- Died: 14 September 1646 (aged 55)
- Education: Merton College, Oxford
- Title: Earl of Essex
- Spouse(s): Frances Howard; Elizabeth Paulet
- Parent(s): Robert Devereux, 2nd Earl of Essex; Frances Walsingham

Robert Devereux, 3rd Earl of Essex, KB, PC (/ˈdɛvəˌruː/; 11 January 1591 – 14 September 1646) was an English Parliamentarian and soldier during the first half of the 17th century. With the start of the Civil War in 1642, he became the first Captain-General and Chief Commander of the Parliamentarian army, also known as the Roundheads. However, he was unable and unwilling to score a decisive blow against the Royalist army of King Charles I. He was eventually overshadowed by the ascendancy of Oliver Cromwell and Thomas Fairfax, and resigned his commission in 1646.

== Youth and personal life ==
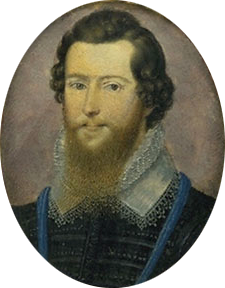
The earl's father, Robert Devereux, 2nd Earl of Essex by Isaac Oliver, c. 1597

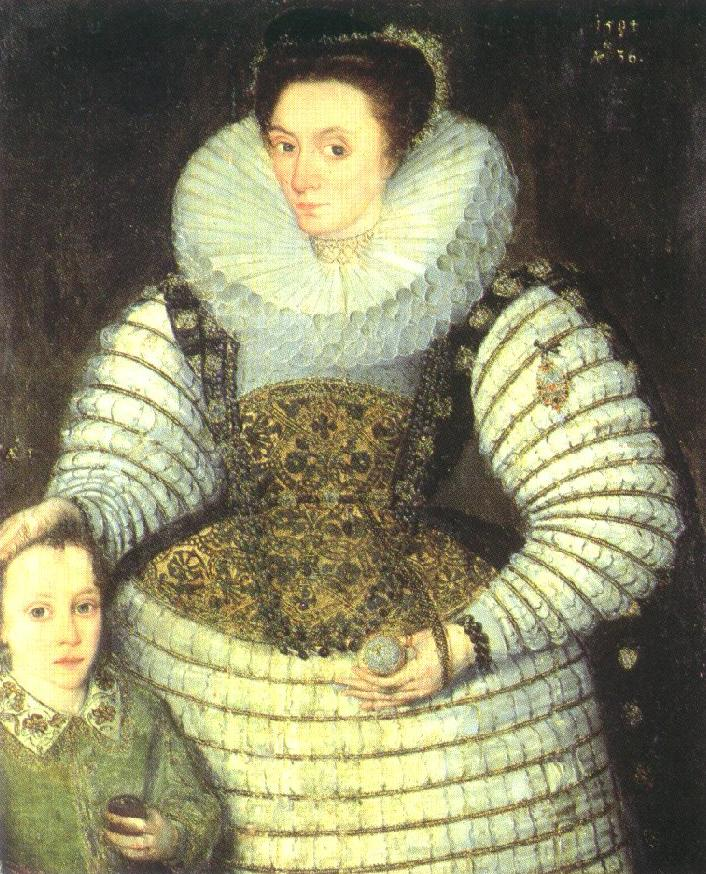
Robert Devereux as a child with his mother Frances Walsingham, countess of Essex by Robert Peake the elder, 1594

Robert Devereux was the son and heir of Robert Devereux, 2nd Earl of Essex, the courtier and soldier from the later reign of Queen Elizabeth I. His mother was Frances Walsingham (1567–1633), the only daughter of Sir Francis Walsingham, Elizabeth's spymaster. He was born at the home of his grandmother, Lady Walsingham, in Seething Lane, London.

His education continued at Eton College and Merton College, Oxford, being created MA by the university in 1605.

The 2nd Earl led an unsuccessful rebellion against Elizabeth in 1601. He was subsequently executed for treason and the family lost its title. However, King James I chose to restore it after he became King of England. In 1604, Robert Devereux became the 3rd Earl of Essex. The young earl became a close friend of Henry Stuart, Prince of Wales.

Essex was married at age 13 to the 14-year-old Frances Howard; he was then sent on a European tour from 1607 to 1609, apparently without having consummated the marriage. Meanwhile, his wife began an affair with Robert Carr, Viscount Rochester, a favourite of King James I. After Essex's return, Frances sought an annulment on the grounds of impotence. Essex claimed that he was only impotent with her and had been perfectly capable with other women, adding that she "reviled him, and miscalled him, terming him a cow and coward, and beast."

The divorce was a public spectacle and it made Essex a laughing stock at court. It was small comfort that the finding that Frances was still a virgin was greeted with equal derision: as a popular ballad put it The Dame was inspected, but fraud interjected a Maid of greater perfection. The annulment was granted on 25 September 1613, and Frances married her lover, who had been made 1st Earl of Somerset, on 26 December 1613. Three years later the Somersets were tried by a panel of Lords for their part in the murder of Sir Thomas Overbury; Essex sat as a juror in the trial of his former wife and pressed the King to send her to the scaffold. Both were condemned to death, but the sentence was not carried out.

On 12 March 1640, Essex married Elizabeth Pawlett, daughter of Sir William Pawlett, of Edington, Wiltshire, past High Sheriff of Wiltshire and cousin of William Paulet, 4th Marquess of Winchester. Elizabeth was introduced at Court during the Great Parliament of 1628/29 just after her father died, as the eldest unmarried daughter needing to marry to improve her family prospects. Back from travels in military service on the Continent (see below) Robert was also pressured to marry again (and quickly) to show the Court the humiliation from his first marriage could be overcome. This marriage was also a disaster and failed, though not as publicly. They separated in 1631, the Countess remaining at Essex House in the Strand, London, Robert "playing soldiers" at his estates.

There was a son from the union, Robert, styled Viscount Hereford, who was born on 5 November 1636 and died of plague a month later. Essex, who had given the birth date as a deadline beyond which he would have disowned the child, grudgingly acknowledged him as his own; however, the father was widely suspected by the Court to be Elizabeth's alleged lover, Sir Thomas Uvedale (from the alleged prompting of William Seymour, 1st Marquess of Hertford, Robert's brother-in-law who leased part of Essex House in London, and expected to inherit if Robert had no issue). Elizabeth, through her funeral oration (in 1656) by her second husband Sir Thomas Higgons, vigorously denied this.

== Military career: 1620–1640 ==
In 1620 Essex embarked on what was to be an undistinguished military career prior to the start of the First English Civil War. Between 1620 and 1624 he served in Protestant armies in Germany and the Low Countries. In 1620 he joined Sir Horace Vere's expedition to defend the Palatine. In 1621 he served with Prince Maurice of Nassau, and in 1622 with Count Ernst von Mansfeld (battle of Fleurus, 29 August 1622). In 1624 he commanded a regiment in the unsuccessful campaign to relieve the siege of Breda.

In 1625, under Sir Edward Cecil, he commanded a squadron as vice-admiral and as colonel of a foot regiment in the failed English expedition to Cadiz.

Despite the lack of distinction, this period of his life gave him a good working knowledge of continental war methods and strategies, even if most of his own experience was limited to defensive operations. Every drive he made to recruit volunteers for these expeditions was successful, such was the loyalty he could command.

Following a period of little distinguished activity in the 1630s, Essex, who had been made Knight of the Bath in 1638, served in the army of King Charles I during the first Scottish Bishops' War in 1639 as Lieutenant-General of the army in the North of England. However, he was denied a command in the second, which took place in 1640. This pushed him further into the arms of the growing number of the King's opponents in Parliament.

== Role in starting the English Civil War: 1640–1642 ==
Robert Devereux's opposition to the Stuart monarchy as a leader of the Country party in the House of Lords was established in the 1620s along with the Earls of Oxford, Southampton, Warwick, Lords Say and Spencer. During one exchange the animosity of King James was evident when he said, "I fear thee not, Essex, if thou wert as well beloved as thy father, and hadst 40,000 men at thy heels."

When King James' son, Charles convened the Short Parliament in 1640 he had ruled without Parliament for 11 years. He was forced to call another one to raise money to fight insurgencies in Scotland and Ireland. However, many Parliamentarians sought to use the new Parliament to bring the King to account. Relations between Charles and his Parliament quickly broke down.

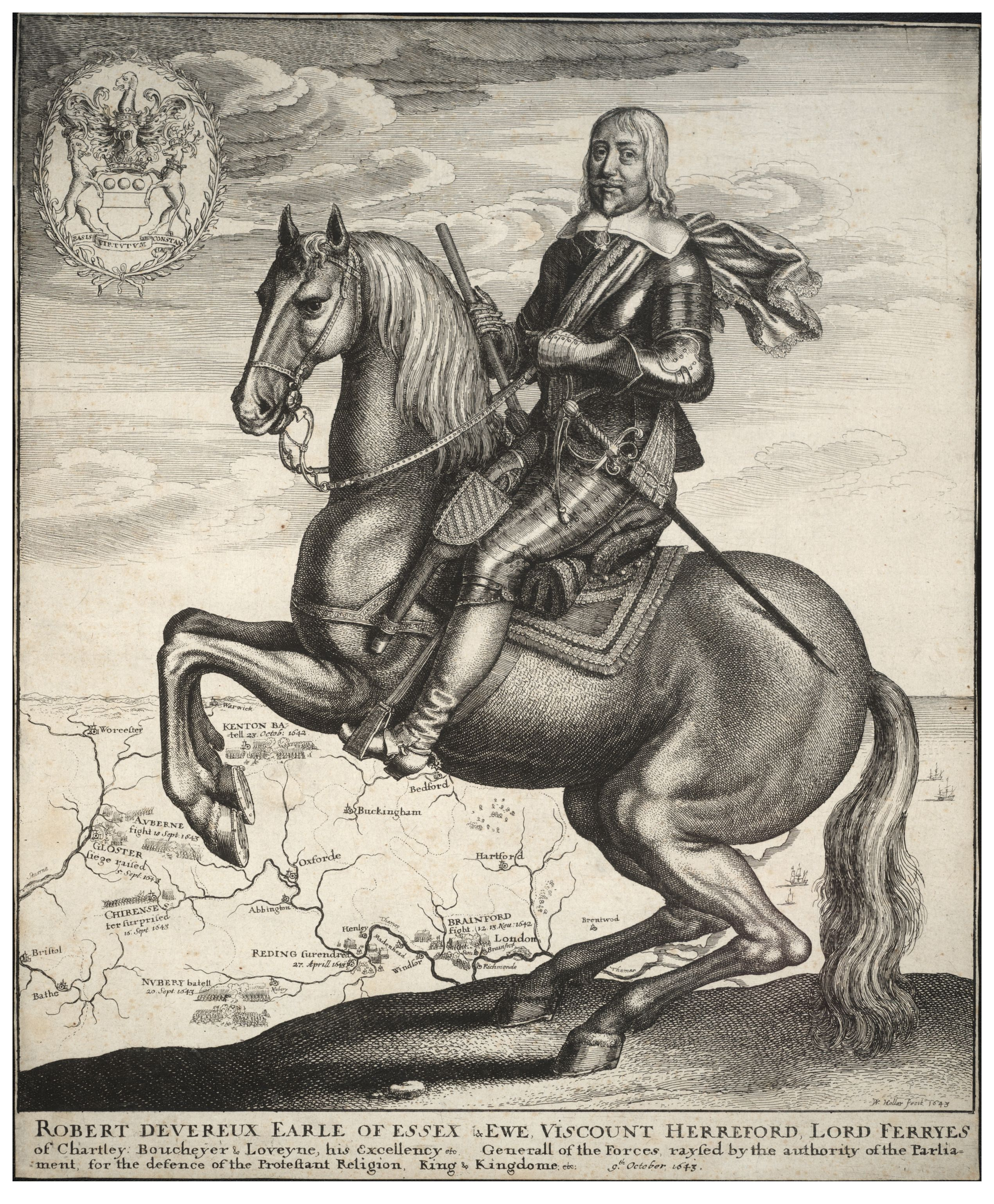
Robert Devereux depicted as Captain General on horseback, an engraving by Wenceslas Hollar

Essex was a strong Protestant and he had a reputation for being one of the puritan nobles in the House of Lords. He was friends with John Pym, one of the strongest critics of Charles in the House of Commons during the Short Parliament and its successor the Long Parliament.

In 1641, Parliament passed a Bill of Attainder against the King's minister Thomas Wentworth, Earl of Strafford, who was fiercely loyal to Charles. Of all Strafford's enemies Essex was perhaps the most implacable, dismissing appeals for mercy with the proverb Stone dead hath no fellow. In an attempt at reconciliation with Parliament, Charles gave royal assent to the Bill of Attainder, resulting in Strafford's execution, and invited leading Parliamentary critics to join his Privy Council. Essex was made Captain General of the royal armed forces south of the River Trent in February and Lord Chamberlain in July.

However, the relationship between Charles and his Parliament deteriorated further. On 4 January 1642, Charles went to the House of Commons to arrest Pym and four other members for their treason. Essex had tipped off the five members about what the King was planning to do. Charles was humiliated when he entered the House of Commons only to find that the five members had fled. In that same month, Essex began to absent himself from Charles's court. In April he was dismissed from the office of Lord Chamberlain when he failed to join the King at York. His position as Captain-General of the southern forces was deemed to have lapsed.

As the unprecedented prospect of a military confrontation between the King and Parliament grew, on 4 July 1642 Parliament voted to create a Committee of Safety consisting of ten Members of the House of Commons and five peers, of which Essex was one alongside the Earl of Northumberland, the Earl of Pembroke, the Earl of Holland and Viscount Saye and Sele. Pym, John Hampden and Denzil Holles were the leading members of the committee from the Commons. This committee was supposed to act as a bridge between Members of Parliament and the armed forces supporting them in the field. At this point, these armies primarily consisted of regional defence militias and city-trained bands who were sympathetic to the Parliamentary cause.

On 12 July, Parliament went one step further and voted to raise an army of its own. As one of the few English nobles with any military experience, Essex was chosen to lead it. The Parliamentary ordinance that was passed proclaimed Essex to be:

Captain-General and Chief Commander of the Army appointed to be raised, and of all other Forces of the Kingdom...and that he the said Earl shall have and enjoy all Power, Titles, Preheminence, Authority, Jurisdiction and Liberties, incident and belonging to the said Office of Captain-General, throughout the whole Kingdom of England and Dominion of Wales, in as large and ample a Manner as any other General of an Army in this Kingdom hath lawfully used exercised, and enjoyed.

He accepted the commission. Parliament also bolstered his territorial power by reappointing him Lord Lieutenant of the counties of Yorkshire and Staffordshire, and appointing him that of Montgomeryshire, Herefordshire and Shropshire.

== Role in the First English Civil War: 1642–1646 ==
Essex had been put in a difficult position in 1642. Parliament had voted to raise an army to counter the Royalist one Charles was leading but it was collectively unsure about how to conduct it. This state of affairs was unprecedented in English history. Parliamentarians wanted to avoid open treason and make a deal with the King, but only on their terms.

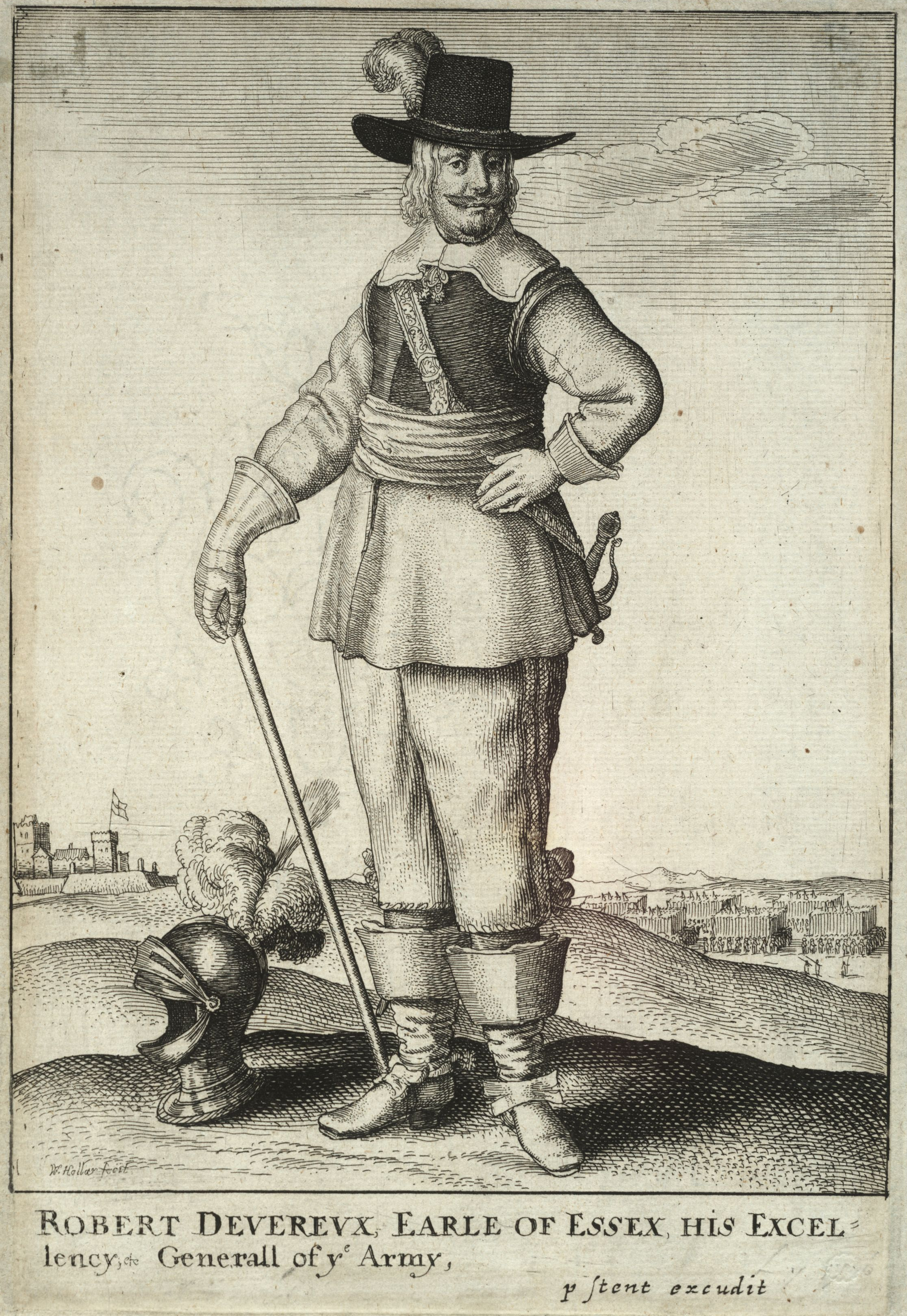
Robert Devereux depicted as Captain General on foot, an engraving by Wenceslas Hollar.

The Parliamentary ordinance that commissioned Essex to his post of Captain-General gave him the task of "preserving the Safety of his Majesty's Person". It did not specifically instruct him to engage the King in battle as this would have been treason. It conveniently blamed the brewing troubles on those surrounding the King rather than Charles himself, specifically "the cunning practice of Papists, and malicious Counsels of divers ill-affected Persons, inciting his Majesty to raise men". It also bound Essex to, "execute the Office of Captain-General, in such Manner, and according to such Instructions, as he shall, from Time to Time, receive from both Houses of Parliament", which was inevitably going to be a constraint on his ability to command an army. All these elements were a weight on the mind of Essex. It is to his credit that he was actually able to raise an army that was capable of fighting the royalist forces in battle.

On 22 August 1642, Charles raised his standard at Nottingham Castle. pronouncing Essex and by extension Parliament traitors. This was a symbolic declaration of war against Parliament. It was clear from this point onwards that the two armies would engage in battle at some point, starting the English Civil War. However, the majority of those supporting Parliament were still fearful of committing treason against the King and this inhibited them in the early years of the conflict. They were also well aware that an agreement with Charles would be necessary to achieve the future settlement of the kingdom once the war was over. A republican settlement was not the objective of the Parliamentary army at this point or during Essex's lifetime. This inevitably gave Charles the upper hand at first.

Royalist MPs gradually filtered away from parliament during 1642. They later joined a rival Parliament in Oxford set up by the King. The remnants of the Long Parliament gradually split into two camps. One wished to defeat the King in battle. The other, known as the peace party, wanted to force Charles to the negotiating table rather than defeat him. Pym led the "middle group", which sought to maintain good relations between the two.

Essex's commitment to the Parliamentary cause never wavered. However, his sympathies lay with the peace party throughout the conflict. This undermined his effectiveness as a military leader.

=== Battle of Edgehill, 23 October 1642 ===
Following several minor skirmishes, the first major engagement between the two armies took place at the Battle of Edgehill on 23 October 1642. Both sides had raised impressive armies. Essex's lifeguard included Henry Ireton, Charles Fleetwood, Thomas Harrison, Nathaniel Rich, Edmund Ludlow, Matthew Tomlinson and Francis Russell. All of them played a leading role in the civil war and its aftermath but a degree of amateurism and bad discipline was evident on both sides during the battle.

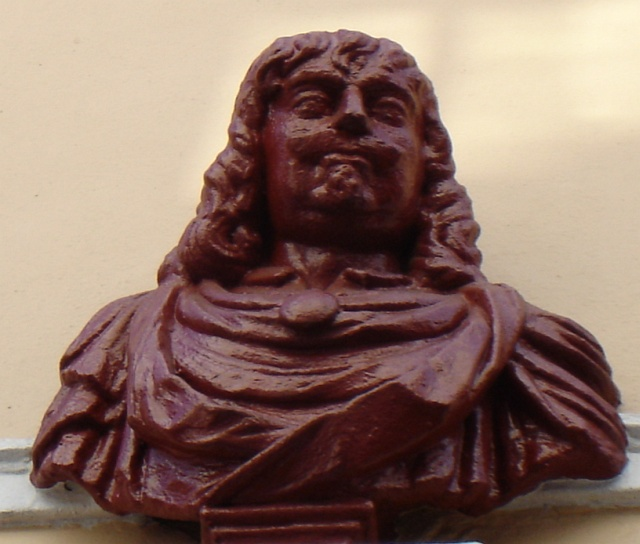
Bust of Robert Devereux.

Following a brief exchange of artillery fire, the battle began with a Royalist cavalry charge led by Prince Rupert of the Rhine. A second Royalist cavalry charge followed, led by Henry Wilmot, 1st Earl of Rochester. Both the right and left flanks of the Parliamentarian horse were scattered. The Royalist cavalry, with their eye on the baggage train, unwisely chose to pursue the fleeing Parliamentarian horsemen but Essex had kept two cavalry regiments in reserve. As the rival infantry divisions engaged in combat, with Essex fighting alongside his troops with a pike, the two remaining Parliamentarian cavalry regiments made a devastating attack on the exposed Royalist foot soldiers.

Both sides incurred heavy losses and the battle ended in stalemate after Rupert's cavalry returned to stop a rout. Both armies spent the night in the field before Essex withdrew the Parliamentarians to Warwick the next day.

This battle and its aftermath portrayed the strengths and weaknesses of Essex's military mindset. His planning and leadership had allowed the Parliamentarian forces to stand their ground. However, his defensive caution and his unwillingness to engage the enemy led to his army being outmanoeuvred. Although Essex had begun his military preparations in London, prior to the battle Charles had been able to position his army in between the Parliamentarian forces and London. This left the road to London open to Charles at the end of the battle. The King had also been able to engage Essex's army before the Parliamentarians were at full strength. On the day of the battle, Essex was still waiting for the arrival of John Hampden's two cavalry regiments and most of the Parliamentary artillery.

Luckily for Essex, Charles did not take much advantage of this superior position. The King chose to make an assault on London with his army at full strength, as he too was awaiting the arrival of more soldiers from around the country. This allowed Essex and his army to make a break for London via Watling Street. Essex arrived back in London to a hero's welcome on 7 November, before Charles was able to get there.

=== Battle of Brentford and the Battle of Turnham Green, 12–13 November 1642 ===
On 12 November Rupert's Royalist army engaged in their first major assault in preparation for a march on London. A small Parliamentarian garrison suffered heavy losses at the Battle of Brentford. The Royalists proceeded to sack the town. This galvanised sentiment in the City of London against a Royalist occupation.

On 13 November, Essex was able to muster 24,000 men for the Battle of Turnham Green, including the remnants of the Edgehill army and the City trained bands, as well as apprentices and militiamen from Hertfordshire, Essex and Surrey. Essex and Major-General Phillip Skippon were key to this display of force by placing their soldiers in effective defensive positions and by keeping up morale. Charles, with much smaller forces, did not engage in battle. His army retreated with only a handful of shots fired.

By the end of 1642, Essex's forces were the weaker side against the Royalists but the Parliamentarians had the sympathy of the Scots and there were thousands of other troops ready to join their cause around the country. The scene was set for a long conflict.

=== First Battle of Newbury, 20 September 1643 ===
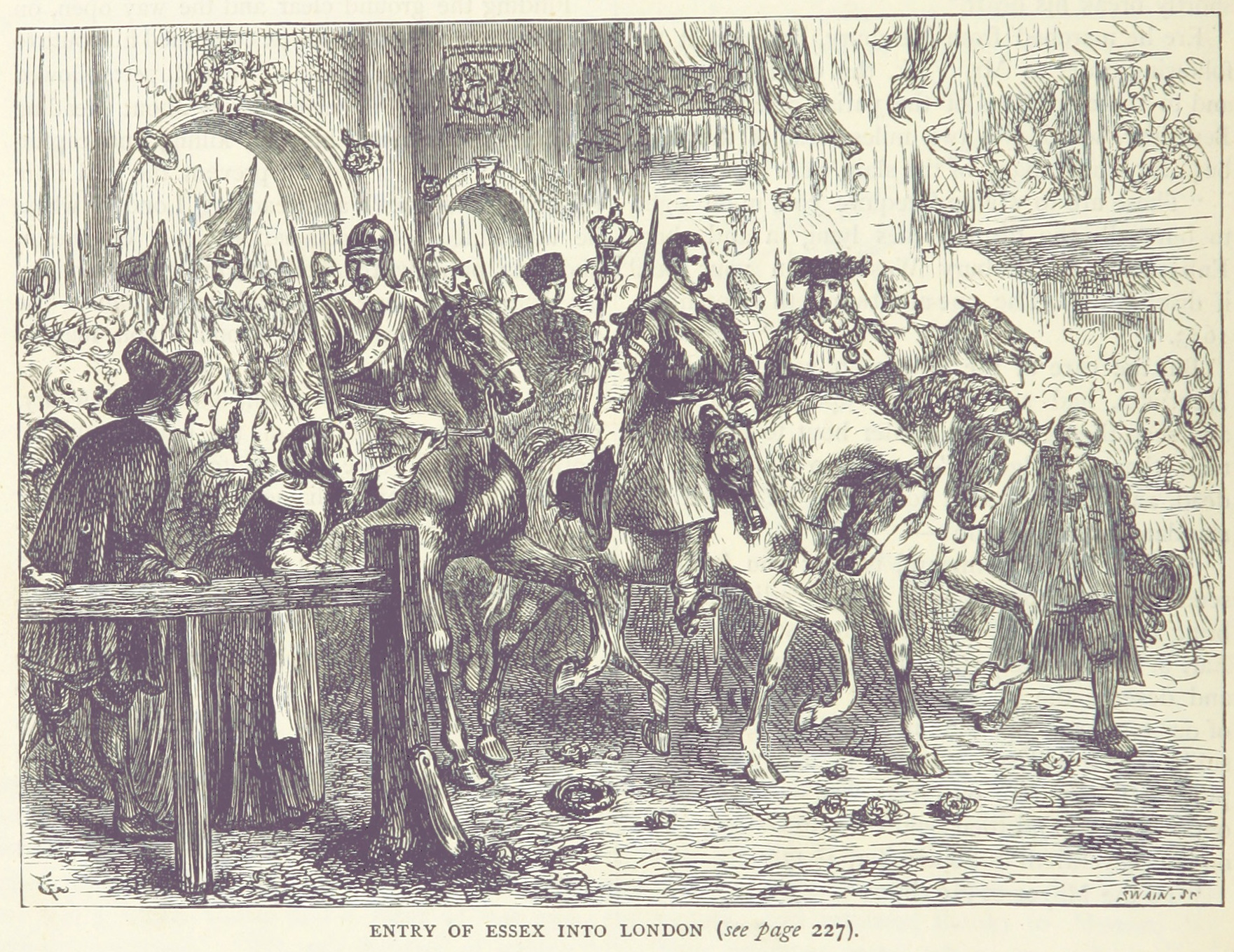
Essex enters London after the First Battle of Newbury

After a long winter break, Essex's army captured and occupied Reading on 26 April 1643 following a 10-day siege. Progress towards the King's base at Oxford after this was slow. Some began to question the willingness of Essex to lead the Parliamentarians to victory in the developing civil war.

The fluctuating performance of his army in 1643 was in contrast to the ascendancy of the Eastern Association. This was an alliance of pro-Parliament militiamen from Essex, Hertfordshire, Norfolk, Suffolk, Cambridgeshire, Huntingdonshire and Lincolnshire commanded by Edward Montagu, 2nd Earl of Manchester. One of their cavalry commanders was Oliver Cromwell. The Eastern Association established itself as a formidable fighting force in 1643, thanks in a large part to Cromwell's regiment, which became known as the 'Ironsides'.

Nonetheless, 1643 was a good year overall for Essex's army. In what was perhaps his finest hour, on 20 September, Essex's forces came off as the stronger side in the First Battle of Newbury. Despite not winning a decisive victory, the Parliamentarians forced the Royalists to withdraw to Oxford. This gave the Parliamentary army a clear road between Reading and London.

=== Lostwithiel Campaign, June–September 1644 ===
1644 proved to be the turning point in the First English Civil War. In February an alliance with the Scots was consolidated with the creation of the Committee of Both Kingdoms, to which Essex was appointed. This replaced the Committee of Safety. It gave the Parliamentarians an edge over the Royalists for the first time.

However, the year also saw the increasing polarisation of the Parliamentary alliance between the peace party and those who wished to defeat the King in battle. The death of Pym in December 1643 led to the demise of the middle group and also deprived Essex of a key ally in the House of Commons. A confrontation between the two sides became inevitable.

On 2 July 1644, Parliamentary commanders Lord Fairfax, Lord Leven and the Earl of Manchester defeated Royalist forces at the Battle of Marston Moor. The conduct of Cromwell, participating with the Eastern Association, was decisive in the victory.

Simultaneously, Essex pursued his campaign to conquer the West Country. This was a strange move and it was made against the advice of the Committee of Both Kingdoms. There was some sympathy for the Parliamentary cause in Devon and Dorset but in Royalist Cornwall, there was practically no support for the Parliamentarians at all.

Although the campaign started well, Essex's army was forced to surrender in September at Lostwithiel after they were outmanoeuvred by the Royalists. The Earl himself escaped in a fishing boat to avoid humiliation. He left the task of surrendering to Skippon.

=== End of military career ===
The Lostwithiel campaign proved to be the end of Essex's military career. His army participated in the Second Battle of Newbury on 27 October. However, the Earl was sick in Reading at the time. His conduct in the West Country had frustrated Cromwell, now the most prominent member of the House of Commons following his military victories and the deaths of Hampden and Pym.

Cromwell had become embroiled in a feud with the Earl of Manchester, who was still his superior officer in the Eastern Association. Essex and Manchester remained sympathetic to the peace party, while Cromwell had emerged as the leading voice in the campaign to fight a more aggressive war against Charles. Following a month of Parliamentary arguments between Manchester and Cromwell, with the former speaking in the House of Lords and the latter making his attacks in the House of Commons, the scene was set for a showdown.

On 19 December 1644, the first Self-Denying Ordinance was approved by the House of Commons. This proposed that all members of the House of Commons and the House of Lords be barred from exercising military commands. This was rejected by the Lords on 13 January 1645. However, on 21 January the Commons passed the New Model Ordinance. This was a proposal to create a united Parliamentary army. It was approved by the Lords on 15 February. Over a month of negotiations ensued between the Commons and the Lords concerning who was going to command this army.

On 2 April, Essex and Manchester gave way and resigned their commissions. The next day a revised Self-Denying Ordinance was approved by the House of Lords. This discharged members of both Houses from military commands but did not reject the possibility of their future reappointment. Although Essex still had many supporters in Parliament, he had enough opponents to block his re-emergence as a military leader at this stage.

These reforms led to the creation of the New Model Army led by Sir Thomas Fairfax, son of the victorious Lord Fairfax at the Battle of Marston Moor. Cromwell was swiftly appointed to the post of Lieutenant-General, Fairfax's second-in-command.

== Death and funeral ==
For the rest of his days, Essex was associated with the emerging Presbyterian faction in Parliament. One of his last political battles was his involvement with a plan to build up Edward Massey's Western Association into an army capable of counterbalancing the New Model Army. Massey had been one of the few Parliamentary commanders to retain an independent commission when the New Model Army was formed. However, this plan failed when Parliament disbanded Massey's army in October 1646.

In 1645, Essex was given Somerhill House near Tonbridge, Kent, which had been sequestrated by Parliament from his half-brother Ulick Burke, 5th Earl of Clanricarde, following the Battle of Naseby. On 1 December that year Parliament voted for him to be created a Duke but no elevation in his peerage followed.

The Earl of Essex died in September 1646 without an heir. After hunting in Windsor Forest he had a stroke on the 10th and died in London, at Essex House, four days later, aged fifty-five. The earldom died with him, until it was revived in 1661 for Arthur Capel. His death not only weakened the Presbyterian faction in Parliament, it also began the decline of the influence of the nobles who supported the Parliamentary cause. His viscountcy devolved on Walter Devereux, who was a younger grandson of the 1st viscount and cousin to the 1st Earl of Essex.

His death led to a large display of mourning. Parliament contributed £5,000 to the expenses of his funeral and he was buried in Westminster Abbey. For the occasion, the chancel of the Abbey was draped in black from floor to ceiling and a funeral effigy of the earl dressed in scarlet breeches, a military buff-coat and Parliamentary robes was erected beneath a catafalque designed by Inigo Jones. This was left standing after the ceremony until a poor farmer from Dorset, said to have been a former royalist soldier, hacked it down on the grounds that an angel had told him to do so. The effigy was restored but Charles II ordered that it be taken down during the Restoration, although – unlike most Puritans interred in the Abbey during the Civil War and Commonwealth – his body was allowed to remain buried.

The Dowager Countess of Essex remarried, in about 1647, to diplomat and politician Sir Thomas Higgons (1624–1691). By him, she had two daughters before dying in 1656.

== Cultural references ==
Essex is portrayed by actor Charles Gray in the 1970 film Cromwell, inaccurately depicted sitting in the House of Commons in Cromwell's presence, whereas in fact, Essex was already a member of the Lords before the Civil War.

Essex is portrayed by actor Matt Barkley in the 2024 miniseries Mary and George produced by Sky television.

== See also ==
- Politics of the United Kingdom
- Government of the United Kingdom
- Parliament of England
- Governance of England

== Notes ==
Political offices
Vacant Title last held by The Earl of Shrewsbury	Lord Lieutenant of Staffordshire; 1612–1627	Succeeded by The Earl of Monmouth
Preceded by Richard Repington	High Steward of Sutton Coldfield; 1612–1646	Succeeded by Richard Newdigate
Preceded by The Lord Gerard	Custos Rotulorum of Staffordshire; 1617–1627	Succeeded by Sir Edward Littleton
Preceded by Sir Edward Littleton	Custos Rotulorum of Staffordshire; 1628–1642	Succeeded by Sir Edward Littleton, Bt
Preceded by The Earl of Monmouth	Lord Lieutenant of Staffordshire; 1629–1642	Vacant English Interregnum
Preceded by The Earl of Pembroke	Lord Chamberlain; 1641–1642	Succeeded by The Earl of Dorset
Preceded by The Viscount Savile	Lord Lieutenant of Yorkshire; 1641–1642	Office abolished
Peerage of England
Preceded by Robert Devereux	Earl of Essex; 8th creation 1604–1646	Extinct
Preceded by Robert Devereux	Viscount Hereford; 1604–1646	Succeeded by Walter Devereux
Preceded by Robert Devereux	Baron Ferrers of Chartley; 1604–1646	In abeyance Title next held by Robert Shirley
Preceded by Robert Devereux	Baron Bourchier; 1604–1646	In abeyance
