= Elizabeth Compton, Countess of Northampton =

British peer

Elizabeth Compton
- Countess of Northampton
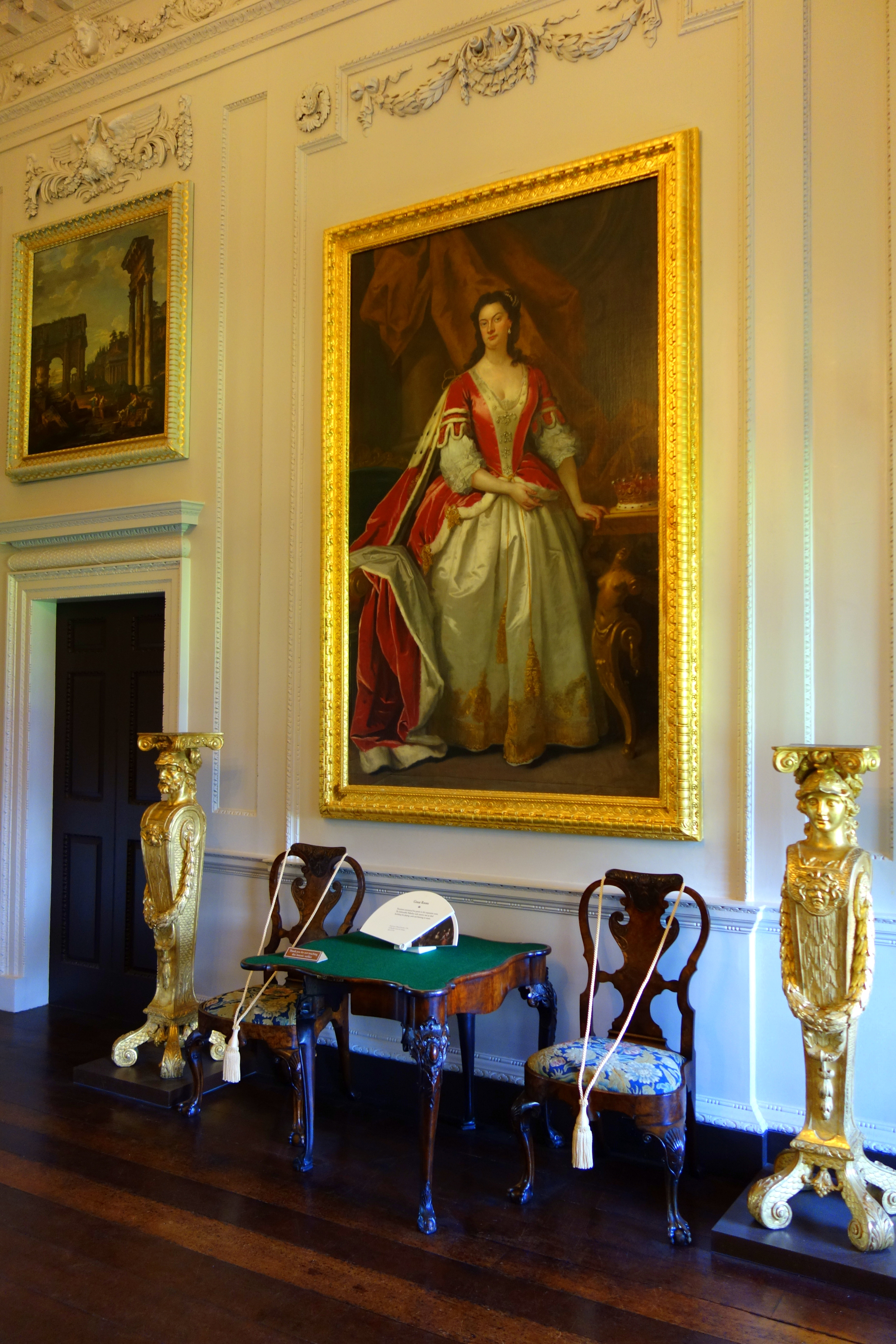
- Elizabeth Compton, Countess of Northampton, by John Vanderbank
- Born: 19 August 1694
- Died: 13 March 1741 (aged 46)
- Noble family: Baroness Ferrers of Chartley
- Spouse: James Compton, 5th Earl of Northampton (m. 1716)
- Issue: Charlotte Townshend, Viscountess Townshend
- Father: Robert Shirley

Elizabeth Compton, Countess of Northampton (19 August 1694 – 13 March 1741), suo jure 15th Baroness Ferrers of Chartley, was a British peer.

Elizabeth was the daughter of the Hon. Robert Shirley, eldest son of Robert Shirley, 1st Earl Ferrers. After the deaths of her father (in 1698) and her brother (in 1714), Elizabeth became her grandfather's heir apparent. She married James Compton, Lord Compton in 1716; on her grandfather's death in 1717, she succeeded him as Baroness Ferrers of Chartley and became Countess of Northampton when her husband inherited the earldom in 1727.

When she died in March 1741, aged 46, her barony fell into abeyance between her daughters. However, the abeyance was terminated eight years later in favour of her daughter Charlotte. Lord Northampton died in 1754 and was succeeded in his junior title of Baron Compton by his daughter Charlotte. She was the wife of George Townshend, 4th Viscount Townshend, later first Marquess Townshend.

== Notes ==
Peerage of England
Preceded by Robert Shirley	Baroness Ferrers of Chartley; 1717–1741	In abeyance Title next held by Charlotte Townshend
