= Washington Shirley, 2nd Earl Ferrers =

British nobleman and soldier

Washington Shirley, 2nd Earl Ferrers (22 June 1677 – 14 April 1729), styled Hon. Washington Shirley until 1714 and Viscount Tamworth from 1714 to 1717, was a British nobleman and soldier.

The second but first surviving son of Robert Shirley, 1st Earl Ferrers (by his first wife, Elizabeth Washington), he matriculated at Trinity College, Oxford in 1693. In 1697, he was commissioned an ensign in the Coldstream Guards. He left the regiment some time after 1702. From 1713 until 1715, he sat for Fore in Ireland, apparently on his wife's interest. Upon the death of his nephew Robert Shirley, Viscount Tamworth in 1714, he adopted that title as heir apparent to his father. He succeeded to the earldom in 1717, but the estates were much diminished by his stepmother's jointure and bequests to his brothers and half-brothers.

He married Mary Levinge (d. January 1740), daughter of Sir Richard Levinge, 1st Baronet and his first wife Mary Corbin, around 1704. They had three daughters:

- Lady Elizabeth Shirley (1704 – 17 August 1734), married Joseph Gascoigne Nightingale and had issue. A remarkable monument to the couple exists in Westminster Abbey.
- Lady Selina Shirley (1707–1791), married Theophilus Hastings, 9th Earl of Huntingdon. She was a leading early Methodist.
- Lady Mary Shirley (25 September 1712 – 12 August 1784), married Thomas Needham, 9th Viscount Kilmorey, without issue

Appointed Lord Lieutenant and Custos Rotulorum of Staffordshire in 1725, he died in 1729. The earldom, for lack of male issue, passed to his brother Henry, a lunatic.

Parliament of Ireland
Preceded by Walter Pollard; Thomas Smith	Member of Parliament for Fore; 1713–1715; With: Denis Kelly	Succeeded by William Smyth; Patrick Fox
Honorary titles
Preceded by The Earl of Bradford	Lord Lieutenant and Custos Rotulorum of Staffordshire; 1725–1729	Vacant Title next held by The Earl Ferrers
Peerage of Great Britain
Preceded by Robert Shirley	Earl Ferrers; 1717–1729	Succeeded by Henry Shirley
