= Capital & Centric =

British property development company

Capital & Centric ltd
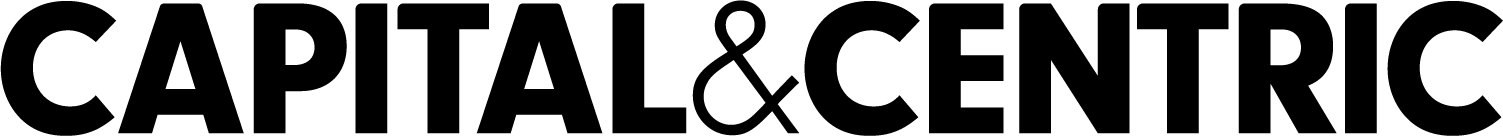
- Type: Public
- Industry: Real estate
- Founded: November 2011
- Headquarters: Manchester, United Kingdom
- Area served: United Kingdom
- Key people: Tim Heatley, Director; Adam Higgins, Director
- Services: Property development and investment
- Website: capitalandcentric.com

Capital & Centric Ltd is a British property development and investment company based in Manchester.

The company was formed in November 2011, when Capital Commercial Properties, started by Adam Higgins, and Centric Property Group, started by Tim Heatley, merged to form a single corporate entity.

== Projects ==
Capital & Centric often focus on regeneration projects that aspire to the creation of jobs in the local area. However, the creation of these jobs has yet to be demonstrated. It was reported in 2022 that they have over £500 million of property under construction. In the last 10 years, they have worked on 2,000,000 square feet (190,000 m^{2}) of development.

Developments are predominantly in the North West, Yorkshire and the Midlands. According to the Manchester Evening News, Capital & Centric are one of the most active property companies in the North West.

The company is known for its projects pertaining to conversation of heritage buildings into mixed use developments and residential schemes. It is also known for converting mills and heritage buildings into residential and commercial spaces.

=== Piccadilly East ===
Capital & Centric started the regeneration of Piccadilly East with the purchase of Grade II listed Crusader Works in 2015. The 200 year old mill has been restored into 123 apartments, for sale to owner-occupiers only with private green residents' courtyard. However, the project remains unfinished, still classed as a "live building site" with significant defects and shortcomings relative to the claimed specification. Additionally, Capital & Centric have let properties in the development out, at odds with their owner-occupier only strapline. Manchester Evening News reported about people queuing for the apartment sale when the first sale was made public in 2017 for "locals only" and investors were banned.

The company is also known for Phoenix, an industrial style new build residential project with 75 homes. Adjacent to Crusader, Phoenix home owners share the gardens and investors are also banned, however the developer themselves seems to be exempt from this rule as they have also let flats out due to struggles with selling remaining units.

During the construction of Crusader, Capital & Centric used the building as a meanwhile use space for independent pop-ups, such as Track Brewery and Chapeltown Picture House. They also hosted charity events such as 'Art Battle' and 'Mancunian Spray' to raise funds to tackle homelessness. However, they did not support the art community that was previously using the space with relocation following their purchase of the property, with predictably negative social impacts on the local community.

The company completed the restoration of Grade II listed Ducie Street Warehouse in 2019. It is made up of 162 aparthotel suits, a bar and restaurant, mini-cinema, coffee shop, gym meeting rooms and all day lounge.

Capital & Centric completed its Jenga inspired hotel on Adair Street in 2022, which is now operated by Leonardo Hotels.

Its next project in Piccadilly East is Ferrous, a £28 million project with 107 rental apartments, two commercial units and the Cabin, a new space for pop-ups.

The regeneration of Piccadilly East featured on the BBC Two docuseries Manctopia: Billion Pound Property Boom. The Times named the area as one of the "next greatest places to live" in 2020.

=== Kampus ===
The company is also known for Kampus, created in partnership with Henry Boot Developments. Kampus is a private rented project located in central Manchester, on the former Manchester Metropolitan University campus.

The mixed-used development includes the restoration of listed buildings, Minto & Turner and Minshull House, a 1960s Brutalist building called The Stack and two new build apartment blocks. The scheme is home to a number of independent commercial units, as well as The Bungalow, the former security cabin on stilts, which serves as a pop-up space. In 2022, it was nominated as best pop-up at Manchester Food and Drink Festival.

Kampus is well known for its new public spaces, including the re-opening of Little David Street, thought to be one of the only untouched cobbled streets in Manchester and the public gardens overlooking the Rochdale Canal. Manchester Confidential are reported to have described the Kampus garden as an oasis, adding it is "The most enchanting of all the new spaces accessible to the public."

=== Littlewoods ===
Another of Capital & Centric's regeneration projects is the Littlewoods Pools building in Liverpool, set to become a new £35 million film and TV studio hub. As a result of the regeneration, hundreds of jobs will be created. The Littlewoods scheme was unanimously approved in 2013. In 2018 it was announced that Twickenham Studios would be opening a £50 million major new complex at Littlewoods, taking 85,000 square feet (7,900 m^{2}) of the 300,000 sq ft (28,000 m^{2}) space. The project is expected to generate more than 570 jobs and to support some 2,000 further jobs in the region, providing a boost of up to £124 million to the local economy, according to statistics drawn up by economics firm Ekosgen.

In September 2018, a fire damaged the building, however reports and the developers stated that this would not hamper project milestones and completion. Liverpool John Moores University signed on to take 75,000 sq ft (7,000 m^{2}) of space in the studios as the official education partner in September 2020. According to the CBRE, this was the largest commercial letting in the North West of that year.

=== Eyewitness Works ===
In 2018 Capital & Centric announced its plan to transform Eye Witness Works on Milton Street in Sheffield into around 100 apartments, after acquiring the building from Sheffield City Council. The Grade-II listed former cutlery works, which dates back to 1852, produced pocket and kitchen knives in industrious pre-war Britain, for 150 years.

It was revealed in 2022 that Eye Witness Works would be the home of a Channel 4 interior design TV show Design Your Dream, where the winner wins the apartment they designed.

=== Other projects ===
As of 2022, Capital & Centric has a number of projects underway in Greater Manchester, including Weir Mill in Stockport, Farnworth, Ancoats Works, Talbot Mill, Ferrous and Swan Street which is currently home to Ramona and the Firehouse.

In 2022, the company's plans for the Goods Yard in Stoke-on-Trent were approved. The project is a mixed-used development with 174 new homes, work space, shops, café-bars and a new public square.

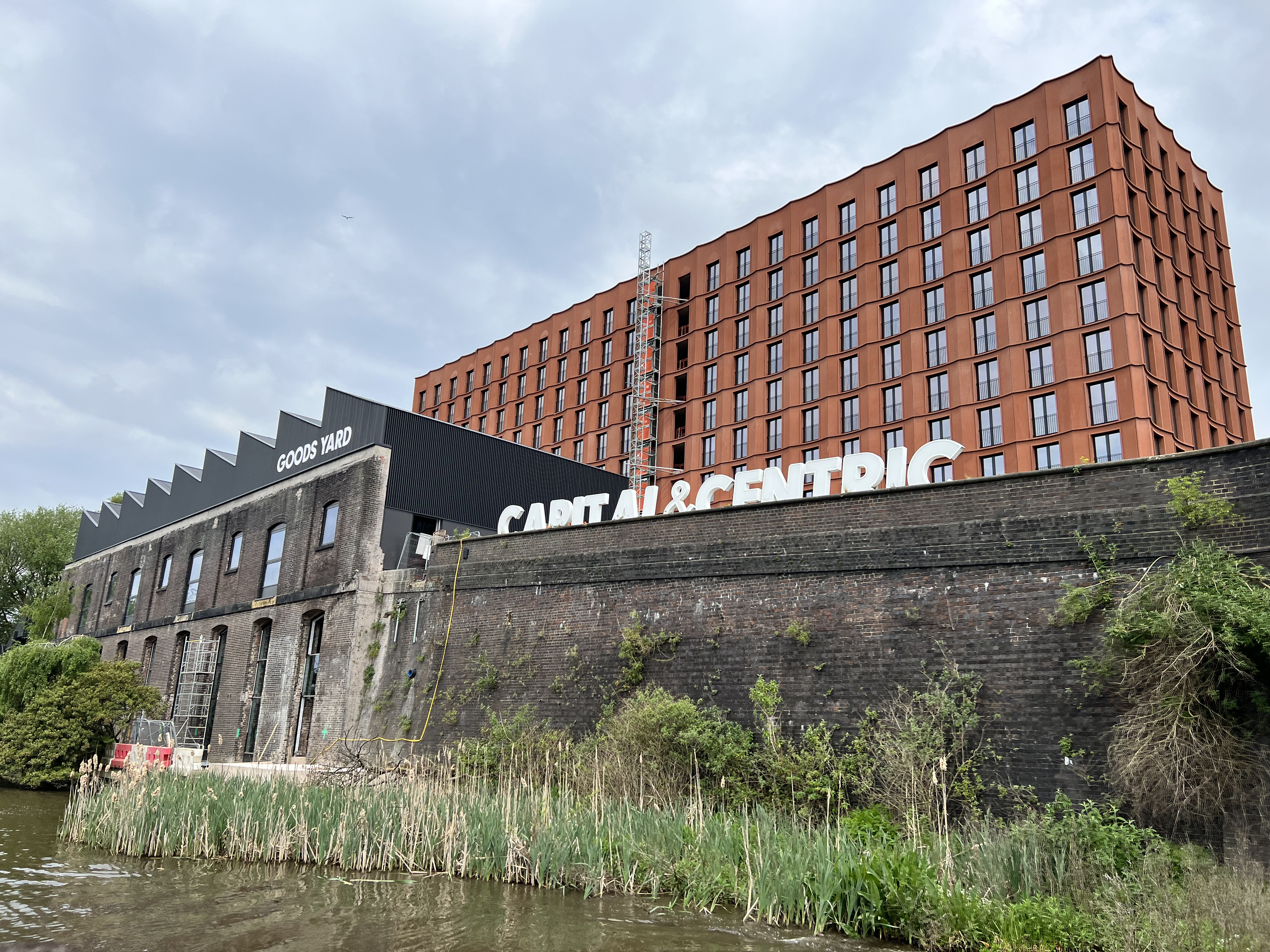

In 2015 Capital & Centric announced housebuilding arm Nowhaus, now known as Neighbourhood, which aims to build twice as many homes on a site as traditional housebuilders.

The company announced its Bunker scheme in Liverpool in 2017, adjacent to the Littlewoods Pools building. In 2015, the company announced it had secured the first tenant for its Tempest office development in Liverpool city centre. In 2016, the company completed construction on the Foundry in Salford.

In 2023, Capital & Centric agreed to acquire council-owned sites around Bolton's train and bus stations and draw up a plan for their redevelopment into homes.

== Social impact aims ==
The company is known for its Regeneration Brainery initiative, which is a free education platform for young people to get into property. Co-founder of Capital & Centric, Tim Heatley, is the chair of Manchester Mayor Andy Burnham's Greater Manchester Mayor's Charity.

During 2018, the organisation launched an initiative to tackle homelessness with charity Embassy where ex-tour buses are used to provide temporary accommodation for rough sleepers. In 2021, plans for Embassy Village were approved, which include 40 high quality modular homes, a village hall, outdoor space for allotments and sports, along with additional support to help homeless and vulnerable men get back on their feet.

In May 2019, Raise the Roof, a concert for the Greater Manchester Mayor's Charity raised more than £100,000 to help rough sleeping in the city-region. In 2020, to support the community during the Coronavirus pandemic, Capital & Centric and partners Kamani Property Group, used their development on Swan Street in Manchester city centre as a drop off point for essential items to help those affected by homelessness in and around Manchester.
