= Custos Rotulorum of Staffordshire =

This is a list of people who have served as Custos Rotulorum of Staffordshire.

- William Whorwood bef. 1544–1545
- William Paget, 1st Baron Paget bef. 1547–1563
- Walter Devereux, 1st Earl of Essex 1569–1576
- Thomas Trentham bef. 1577–1587
- Robert Devereux, 2nd Earl of Essex bef. 1594–1601
- Thomas Gerard, 1st Baron Gerard 1601 – aft. 1608
- Robert Devereux, 3rd Earl of Essex 1617–1627
- Sir Edward Littleton 1627–1628
- Robert Devereux, 3rd Earl of Essex 1628 –1642
- Sir Edward Littleton, 1st Baronet 1642–1646
- Interregnum
- William Paget, 5th Baron Paget 1660–1678
- James Scott, 1st Duke of Monmouth 1678–1680
- Robert Spencer, 2nd Earl of Sunderland 1680–1681
- Charles Talbot, 12th Earl of Shrewsbury 1681–1688
- Walter Aston, 3rd Lord Aston of Forfar 1688–1689
- William Paget, 6th Baron Paget 1689–1713
- Henry Paget, 1st Earl of Uxbridge 1713–1715
- Henry Newport, 3rd Earl of Bradford 1715–1725
- Washington Shirley, 2nd Earl Ferrers 1725–1729
- vacant?
- John Leveson-Gower, 1st Earl Gower 1742–1754
- Granville Leveson-Gower, 1st Marquess of Stafford 1755–1799
- George Leveson-Gower, 2nd Marquess of Stafford 1799–1828
- Charles Chetwynd-Talbot, 2nd Earl Talbot 1828–1849

For later custodes rotulorum, see Lord Lieutenant of Staffordshire.
