= James Hawley (Lord Lieutenant) =

British businessman and public servant (born 1937)

- Born: 1937 (age 88–89)
- Education: St Edmund Hall, Oxford
- Occupation: businessman

Sir James Appleton Hawley, KCVO, TD (born 1937) is a British businessman and public servant.

Born in 1937, Hawley graduated with a law degree from St Edmund Hall, Oxford. He was called to the bar in 1961, but immediately became chairman of the tentmakers John James Hawley (Speciality Works) Ltd. In 1970, he also became chairman of J. W. Wilkinson & Co. Ltd. He stepped down from both chairs in 1998.

Outside of business, Hawley has been involved in a range of public organisations and industry associations. In 1969, he became a magistrate for Staffordshire and went on to serve as the county's High Sheriff for the 1976–77 year; in 1978, he became a deputy lieutenant and between 1993 and 2012, he served as Lord Lieutenant of Staffordshire. He was made a Freeman of the City of London in 1986 and was appointed a Knight Commander of the Royal Victorian Order in 2012, the year he retired as Lord Lieutenant.
