= Ian Dudson =

English industrialist, chief executive and non-executive chairman

Sir Ian Dudson KCVO CBE
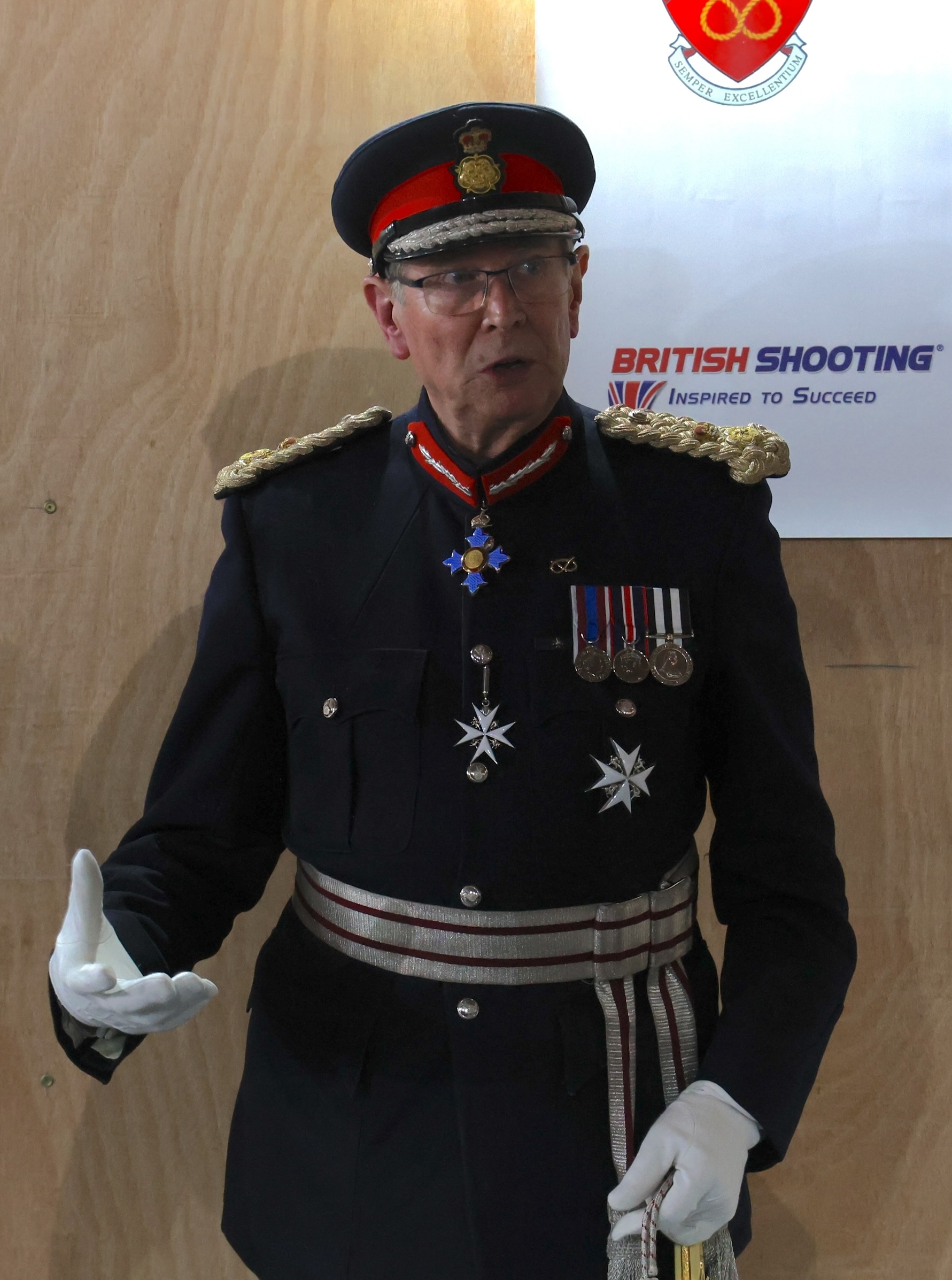
- Sir Ian speaks at a sports club prize-giving before presenting awards
- Born: Ian James Dudson; 15 July 1950
- Education: University of Dundee
- Known for: Lord Lieutenant of Staffordshire
- Spouse: Lady Jane Dudson
- Children: 2

Sir Ian James Dudson KCVO CBE is an English industrialist, chief executive and later non-executive chairman of the ceramics company Dudson in Stoke-on-Trent. He served as Lord Lieutenant of Staffordshire from 2012 to 2025.

== Life ==
Dudson is a descendant of Richard Dudson, who founded the ceramics company Dudson in Hanley, Stoke-on-Trent, in 1800.

He graduated in General Science at the University of Dundee, and studied Ceramic Technology at North Staffordshire Polytechnic (now the University of Staffordshire). He joined Dudson in 1973, and from 1988 was chief executive. More recently he has held the position of non-executive chairman. He was appointed CBE in 2002, for services to the ceramic industry.

He became a Deputy Lieutenant of Staffordshire in 2001, and from 2012 to 2025 served as Lord Lieutenant of Staffordshire. He was High Sheriff of Staffordshire for 2010–2011. He was Pro-Chancellor of Keele University and Chair of Council from 2005 to 2012.

Dudson was appointed in 2013 Commander of the Order of St John, in recognition of his contribution towards "strengthening the spirit of mankind", and in 2017 became a Knight of the Order of St John. In 2014 he was made Honorary Doctor of the University of Staffordshire.

He is Chair of the Trustees of the Dudson Centre, a community resource centre in Stoke-on-Trent for voluntary organisations.

He was made a Knight Commander of the Royal Victorian Order in the 2025 New Year Honours.
