= Lord Lieutenant of Staffordshire =

Civil post in Staffordshire, England

This is a list of people who have served as lord lieutenant for Staffordshire. Since 1828, all lord lieutenants have also been custos rotulorum of Staffordshire.

== Lord Lieutenants of Staffordshire ==
- Henry Stafford, 1st Baron Stafford 1559
- George Talbot, 6th Earl of Shrewsbury 3 July 1585 – 18 November 1590
- vacant
- Robert Devereux, 3rd Earl of Essex 29 February 1612 – 17 July 1627
- Robert Carey, 1st Earl of Monmouth 17 July 1627 – 3 February 1629
- Robert Devereux, 3rd Earl of Essex 3 February 1629 – 1642
- Interregnum
- Robert Greville, 4th Baron Brooke 13 August 1660 – 17 February 1677
- James Scott, 1st Duke of Monmouth 24 March 1677 – 12 December 1679
- Robert Spencer, 2nd Earl of Sunderland 12 December 1679 – 2 September 1681
- Charles Talbot, 12th Earl of Shrewsbury 2 September 1681 – 2 September 1687
- Robert Shirley, 1st Earl Ferrers 2 September 1687 – 19 November 1687
- Walter Aston, 3rd Lord Aston of Forfar 19 November 1687 – 21 March 1689
- William Paget, 6th Baron Paget 21 March 1689 – 26 February 1713
- Henry Paget, 1st Earl of Uxbridge March 1713 – 28 October 1715
- Henry Newport, 3rd Earl of Bradford 28 October 1715 – 27 April 1725
- Washington Shirley, 2nd Earl Ferrers 27 April 1725 – 14 April 1729
- vacant
- Henry Shirley, 3rd Earl Ferrers May 1731 – 16 July 1742
- John Leveson-Gower, 1st Earl Gower 23 July 1742 – 25 December 1754
- Granville Leveson-Gower, 1st Marquess of Stafford 22 January 1755 – 21 October 1799
- George Leveson-Gower, Earl Gower 21 October 1799 – 6 June 1801
- Henry Bayly Paget, 1st Earl of Uxbridge 6 June 1801 – 13 March 1812
- Charles Chetwynd-Talbot, 2nd Earl Talbot 13 April 1812 – 13 January 1849
- Henry Paget, 1st Marquess of Anglesey 3 February 1849 – 29 April 1854
- Edward Littleton, 1st Baron Hatherton 18 May 1854 – 4 May 1863
- Thomas Anson, 2nd Earl of Lichfield 19 June 1863 – 14 July 1871
- Arthur Wrottesley, 3rd Baron Wrottesley 14 July 1871 – 18 March 1887
- William Legge, 5th Earl of Dartmouth 18 March 1887 – 4 August 1891
- William Legge, 6th Earl of Dartmouth 19 October 1891 – 6 May 1927
- John Ryder, 5th Earl of Harrowby 6 May 1927 – 18 January 1948
- Harold Wallace-Copeland 18 January 1948 – 16 August 1968
- Sir Arthur Bryan 16 August 1968 – 6 September 1993
- Sir James Appleton Hawley 6 September 1993 – 29 March 2012
- Ian Dudson 29 March 2012 – 15 July 2025
- Elizabeth Barnes 15 July 2025 – present

== Deputy lieutenants ==
A deputy lieutenant of Staffordshire is commissioned by the Lord Lieutenant of Staffordshire. Deputy lieutenants support the work of the lord-lieutenant. There can be several deputy lieutenants at any time, depending on the population of the county. Their appointment does not terminate with the changing of the lord-lieutenant, but they usually retire at age 75.

=== 19th Century ===
- 28 July 1834: James Bateman

=== 21st century ===
- 2023: Joan Walley
