= Walter Aston =

Walter Aston may refer to:

- Walter Aston (14th-century MP), member of parliament for Leominster
- Sir Walter Aston (MP for Staffordshire) (1530–1589), of Tixall, a Knight of the Shire and Sheriff of Staffordshire
- Walter Aston (burgess) (c. 1606–1656), member of the Virginia House of Burgesses
- Walter Aston (actor) (c. 1706–1739), British stage actor
- Walter Aston (Namibian MP), Members of the Constituent Assembly of Namibia
- Viv Aston (Walter Vivian Aston, 1918-1999), English footballer

Lord Astons

- Walter Aston, 1st Lord Aston of Forfar (1584–1639)
- Walter Aston, 2nd Lord Aston of Forfar (1609–1678)
- Walter Aston, 4th Lord Aston of Forfar (1660/1661–1748)
- Walter Aston, 3rd Lord Aston of Forfar (1633–1714)
- Walter Aston, 8th Lord Aston of Forfar (1732–1805)
- Walter Aston, 7th Lord Aston of Forfar (died 1763)
- Walter Aston, 9th Lord Aston of Forfar (1769–1845)
