= St Mary's Church, Stafford =

St Mary’s Church, Stafford
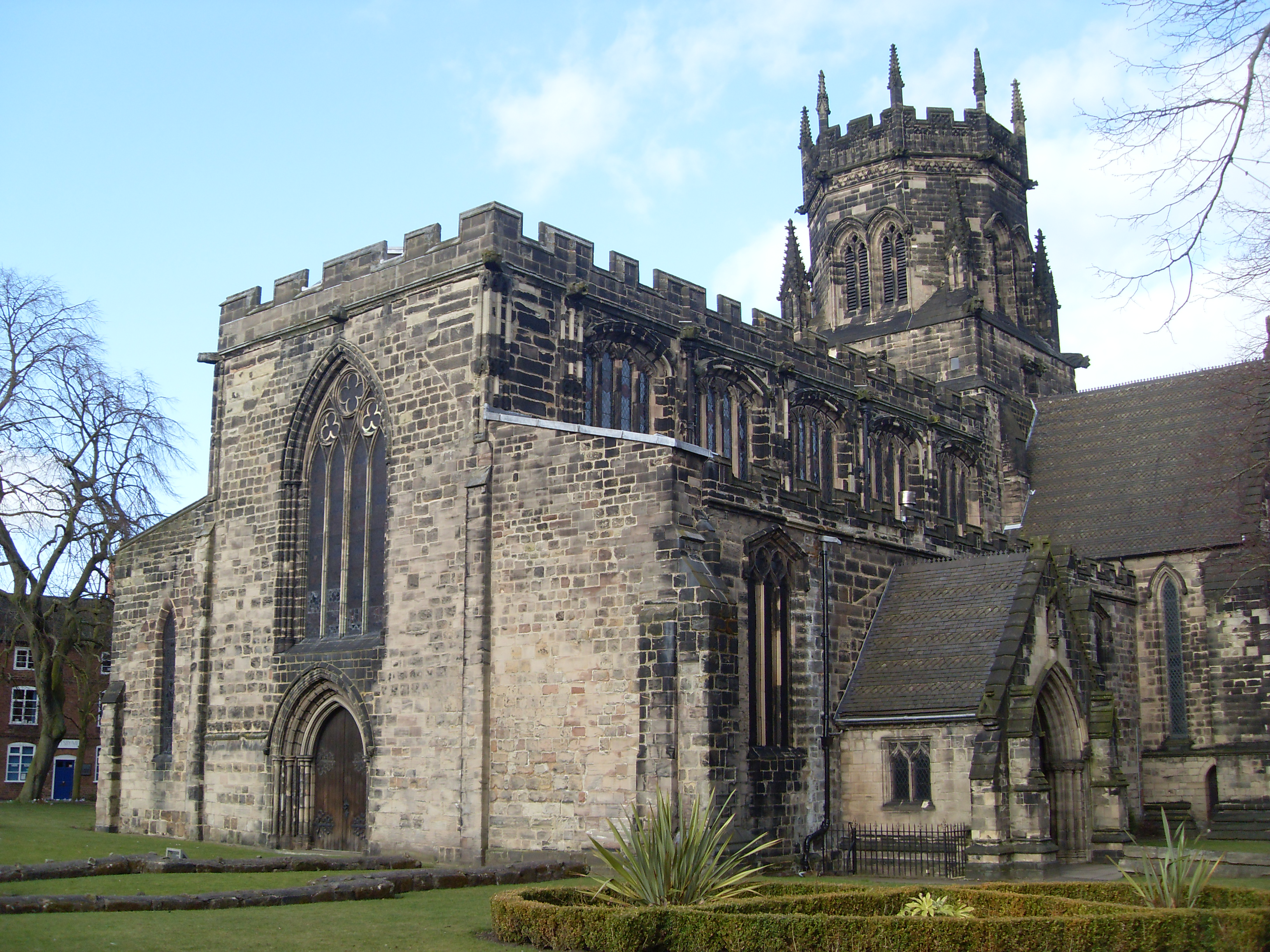
- St Mary’s Collegiate Church, Stafford
- St Mary’s Church, Stafford
- 52°48′21.36″N 2°07′06.97″W
- OS grid reference: SJ 92135 23203
- Location: Stafford, Staffordshire,
- Country: England
- Denomination: Church of England
- Churchmanship: Anglo-Catholic
- Website: stmarysstafford.org.uk

Architecture
- Heritage designation: Grade I listed

Administration
- Diocese: Diocese of Lichfield
- Archdeaconry: Stoke-on-Trent
- Deanery: Stafford
- Parish: Stafford St Mary

Clergy
- Abbot

Listed Building – Grade I
- Official name: Church of St. Mary
- Designated: 16 January 1951
- Reference no.: 1195365
- Rector: Revd Preb Richard Grigson

St Mary's Church, Stafford is a Grade I listed parish church in Stafford, Staffordshire, England.

== History ==
The church dates from the early 13th century, with 14th-century transepts and 15th-century clerestories and crossing tower.

Excavations in 1954 revealed the adjacent late Anglo-Saxon church of St Bertelin.

The church was collegiate when recorded in the Domesday Book when there were 13 Prebendary Canons. It became a Royal Peculiar around the 13th century, exempt from the jurisdiction of the Bishop, but this caused conflict and culminated in December 1258 when the new bishop Roger de Meyland came to Stafford with many armed men who forced entry and assaulted the canons, chaplains, and clerks.

The church survived as a collegiate institution until the dissolution of colleges and chantries in 1548.

=== Deans of Stafford ===
- William de C
- Robert
- Ralph of the Hospital ca. 1184 – 1207
- Henry de Loundres 1207 – 1213
- Bartholomew ca. 1227
- Walter of Lench 1231 – 1246
- Simon of Offham 1247 – 1259
- Bevis de Clare 1259 – 1294
- John of Caen (de Cadamo) 1294 – 1310
- Lewis de Beaumont 1310 – 1317
- Thomas Charlton 1317 – 1318
- Robert of Sandall 1318 – 1325
- Robert Holden 1325 – 1326
- Robert Swynnerton 1326 – 1349
- Nicholas Swynnerton 1349 – ca. 1356
- James Beaufort 1356 – 1358
- John of Bishopston 1358 – ca. 1366
- Robert de More 1366 – 1376
- Adam de Hertyngdon 1376 – 1380
- William de Pakyngton 1380 – 1390
- Lawrence Allerthorpe 1390 – 1397
- John Syggeston 1397 – 1402
- Robert Tunstall 1402 – 1406
- John Mackworth 1406 – 1451
- William Wore ca. 1452 – 1463
- Thomas Hawkins 1463 – ca. 1471
- Name unknown until 1501
- John Thower until 1524
- Thomas Parker 1524 – 1538
- Edward Leighton 1538 – 1548

== Post reformation history ==
For several generations the Aston family, who held the Scots title Lord Aston of Forfar, acted as patrons, despite the fact that the entire family converted to the Roman Catholic faith in the 1620s. When the 2nd Lord Aston, who was popular locally, died in 1678, hundreds of Protestants attended the burial at St Mary's of a man they knew to be a Catholic.

The church was heavily restored by Sir George Gilbert Scott between 1841 and 1844.

== Monuments ==
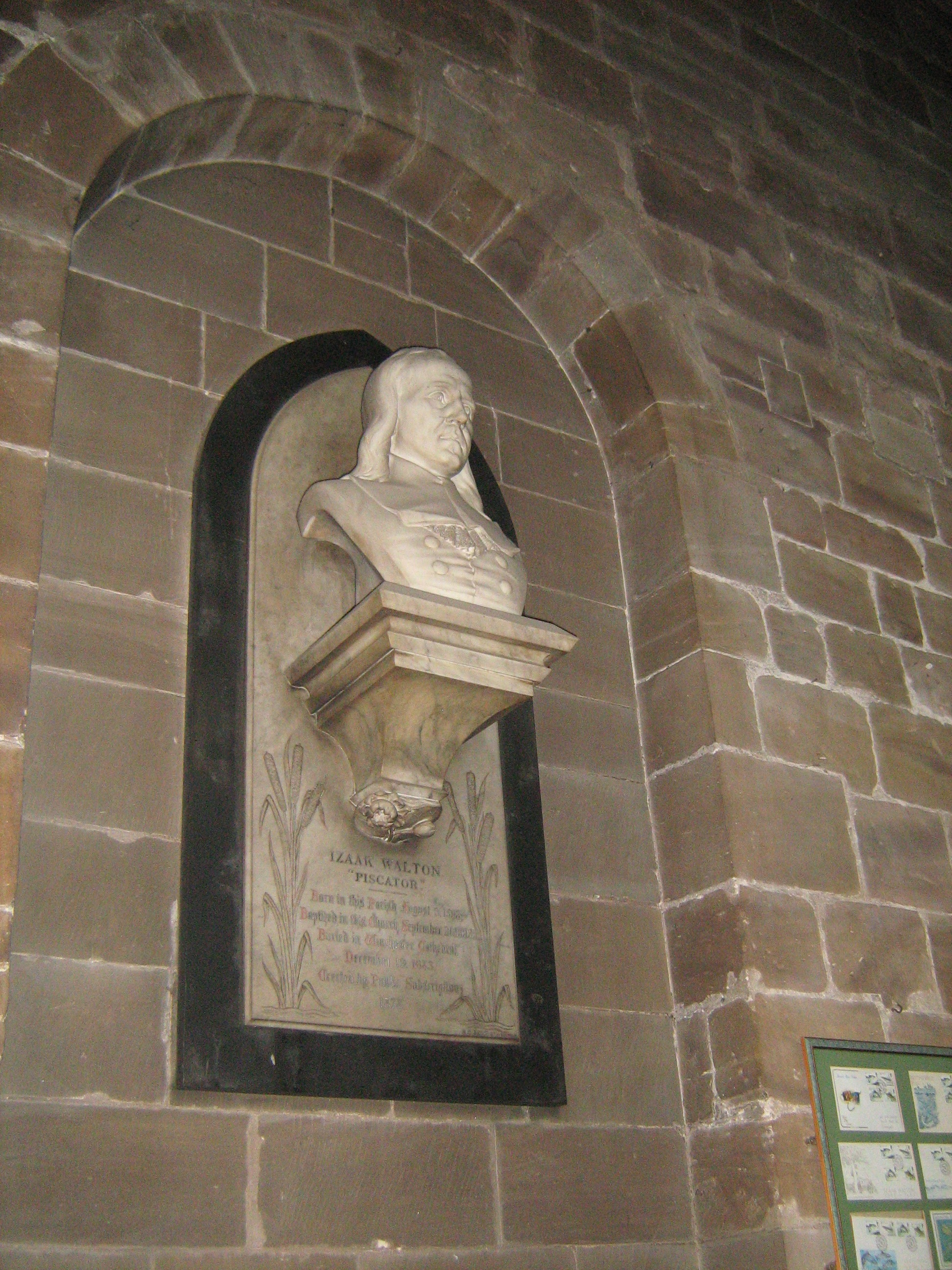
Memorial to Izaak Walton

The church contains

- Chest tomb to Sir Edward Aston d. 1568
- Wall tablet to Thomas (d. 1787) and Barbara Clifford (d. 1786) by John Francis Moore
- Wall tablet to Humphrey Hodgetts (d. 1730)
- Wall tablet to Izaak Walton (d. 1683)

== Other burials ==
- Edward Stafford, 3rd Baron Stafford
- Walter Aston, 2nd Lord Aston of Forfar

== Organ ==
The church has large four manual organ by Harrison and Harrison dating from 1909. It has been awarded a Grade I Historic Organ Certificate by the British Institute of Organ Studies. A specification of the organ can be found on the National Pipe Organ Register.

The second organ dates from 1790 when John Geib installed it at a cost of £820. It was rebuilt in 1844 by John Banfield, and then Hill, Norman & Beard in 1974. A specification of the organ can be found on the National Pipe Organ Register.

=== Organists ===
- George Baker 1794 – 1810
- Edwin Shargool 1841 – 1875
- Inglis Bervon 1875 – 1880
- Ebenezer William Taylor 1880 – 1904
- John Cooper Green

== See also ==
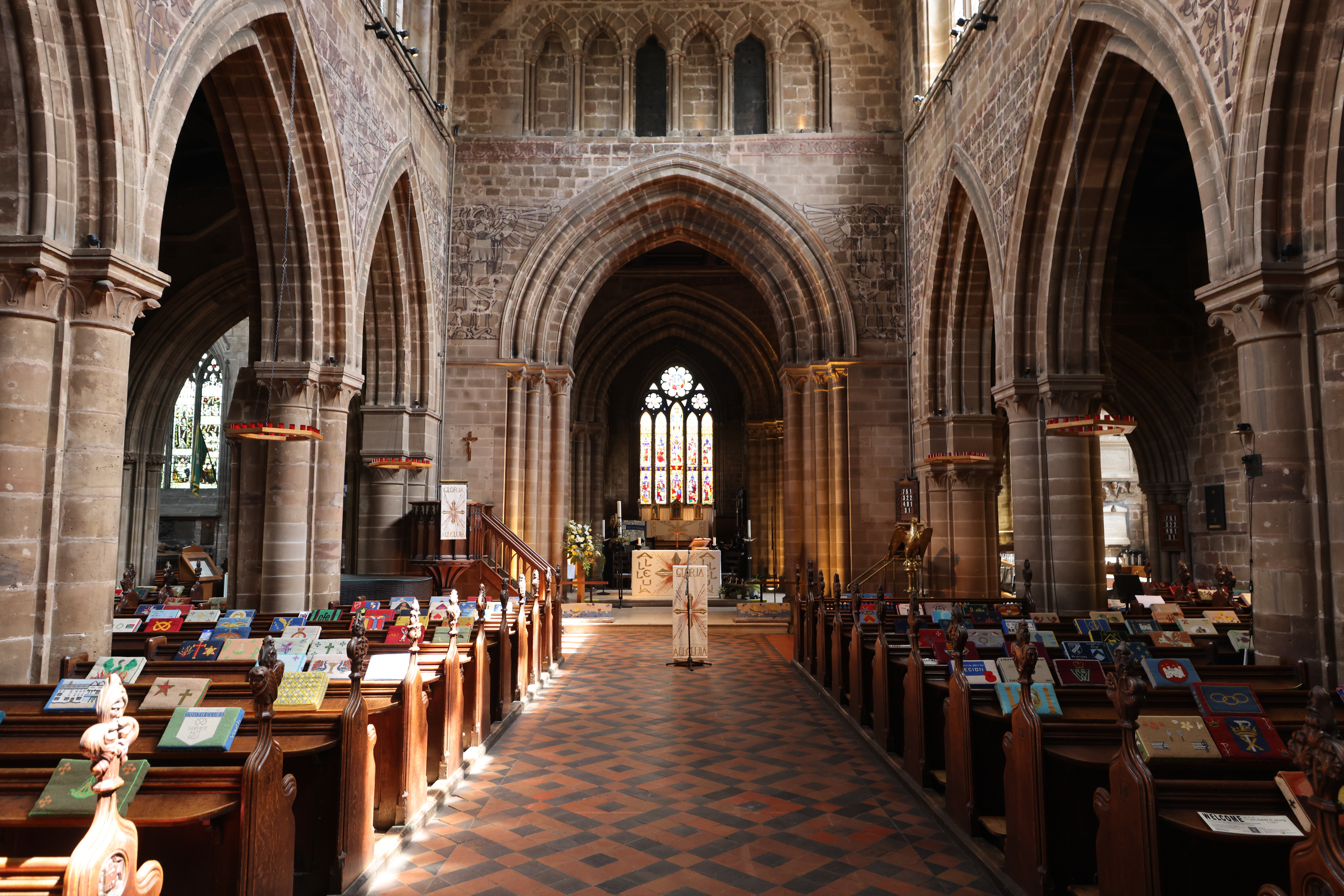
Interior of the church

- Grade I listed buildings in Staffordshire
- Listed buildings in Stafford (Central Area)
- List of collegiate churches in England
