= Square piano =

Musical instrument

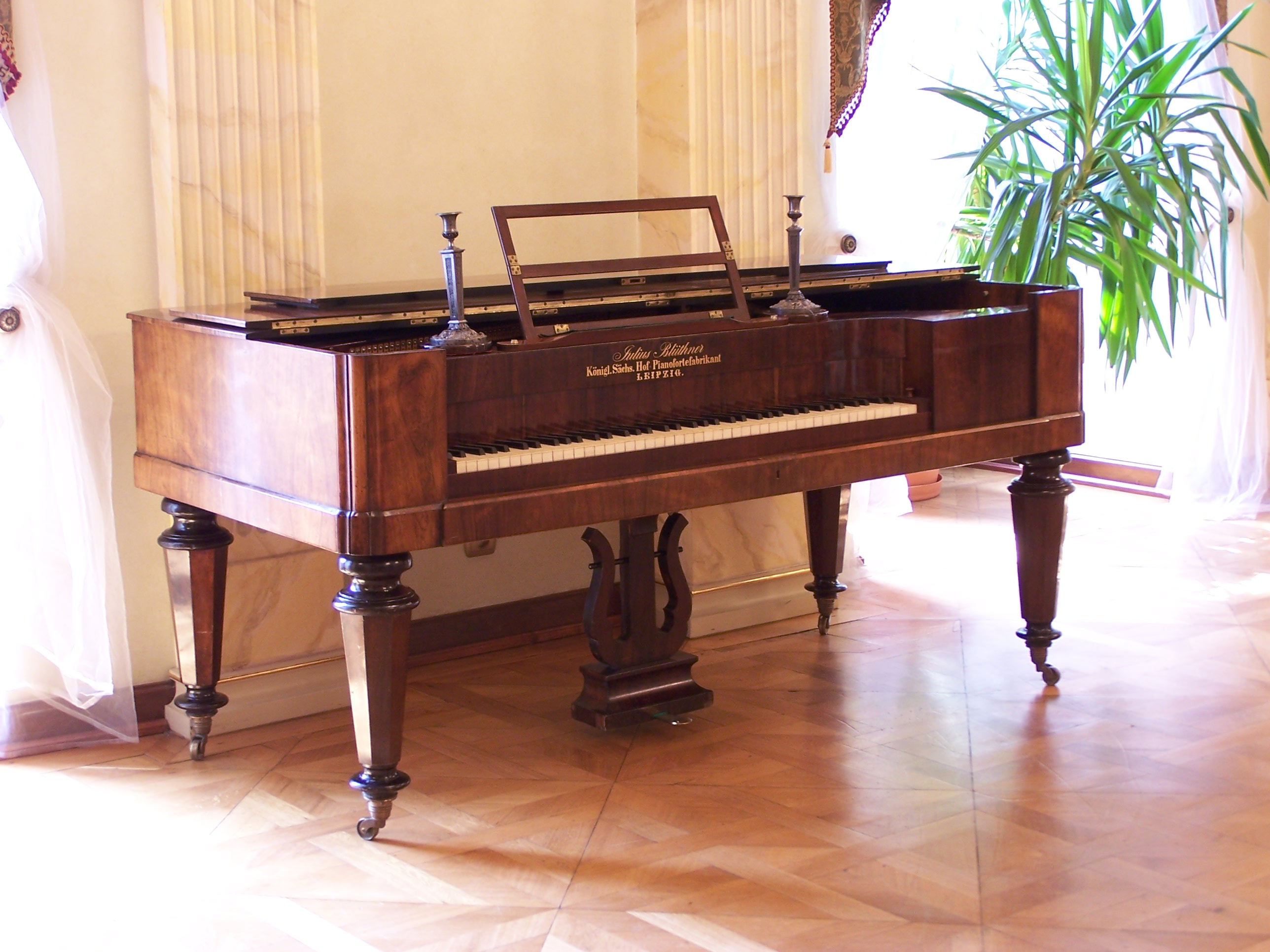
A square grand piano

Performance on a square piano at St Cecilia's Hall, Edinburgh

The square piano is a type of piano that has horizontal strings arranged diagonally across the rectangular case above the hammers and with the keyboard set in the long side, with the sounding board above a cavity in the short side. It is variously attributed to Silbermann and Frederici and was improved by Petzold and Babcock. The English and Viennese square pianos were built in many different designs, including within the action as well as general appearance, from roughly 1760. Because of the competitive industry and relative youth of the instrument design itself, experimentation ensued in the early years, creating a range of moderators (sound-altering effects) and other technical devices (knee levers; hand stops) not seen today.

In London, the explosion of the trade is generally attributed to the maker Zumpe. The overwhelming popularity of his instruments was due to inexpensive construction and price. In the early 19th century, production of square pianos continued to rise. Probably the most prolific manufacturer in this period was John Broadwood & Sons.

Over time, square pianos were built in larger sizes with a wider range, typically around six octaves in the 1820s. By the 1830s, changes to their internal mechanisms and construction, such as the introduction of metal frames, produced more powerful sounds and used higher string tensions. Square pianos were the most popular keyboard instrument of the late 18th century, and the later square grand pianos enjoyed great popularity through the mid- and late-19th century. They were gradually replaced by upright pianos, which had a smaller footprint and larger sound. Square pianos were owned by everyone from George Washington and Thomas Jefferson to Marie Antoinette and Jane Austen.

In the 1860s, more extensive metal frames were developed for square grand pianos, meaning that higher string tensions and therefore greater volumes were possible; however the size increases meant that the upright piano design was more economical, and so the upright replaced the square as the most common home instrument. Built in quantity through the 1890s in the United States, Steinway's celebrated iron-framed, overstrung square grands were more than two and a half times the size of Zumpe's wood-framed instruments that were successful a century before. Whilst many view square pianos as a 'proto-piano', because they do not have the range, volume, or delicacy of touch available on modern instruments, they have a sound and playability all their own, and should be treated as an altogether different instrument to the modern piano.

== Gallery ==
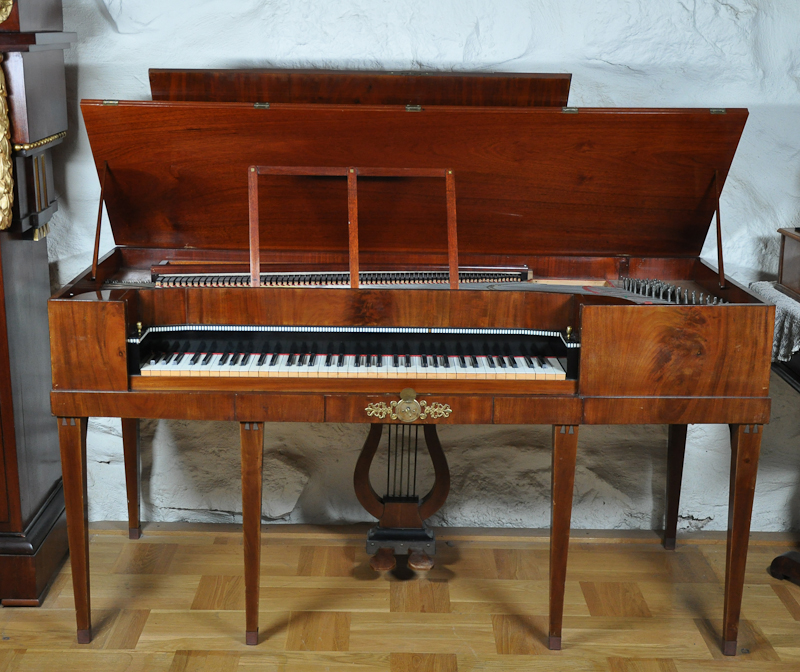

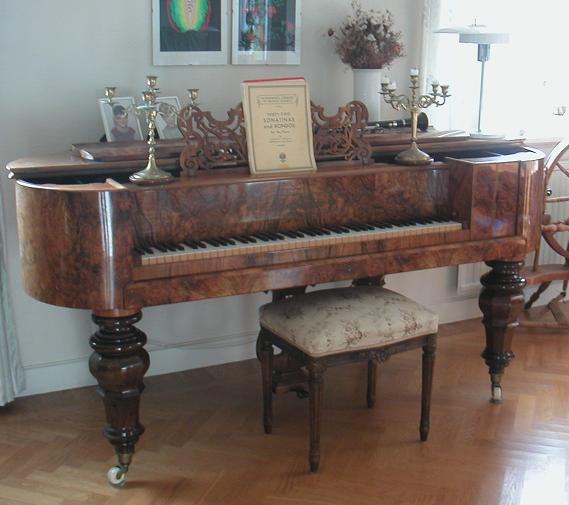
Square grand piano (though this example is not exactly rectangular)

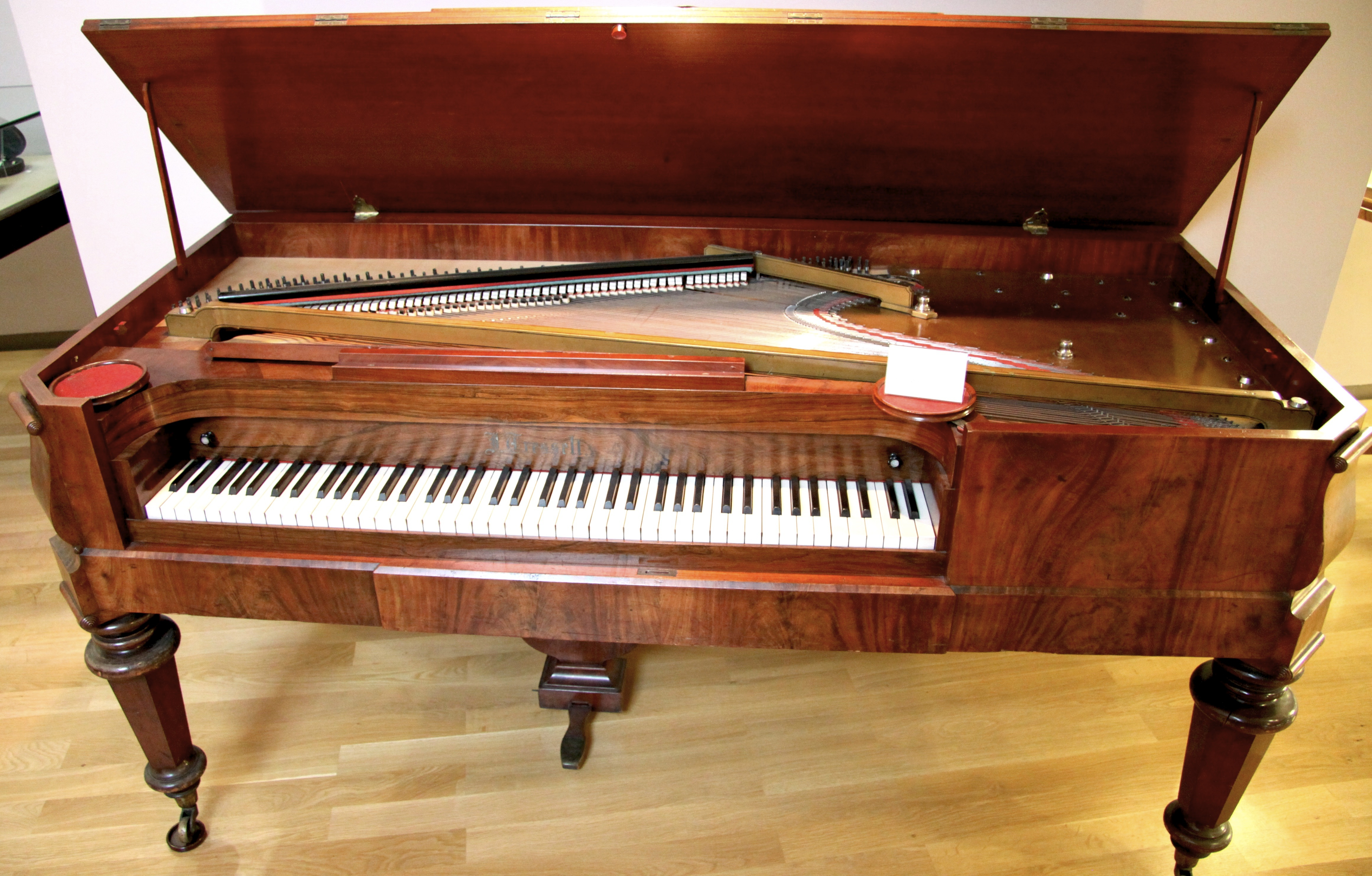
Square grand piano with open lid

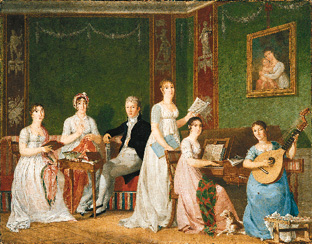
Swedish painting of woman playing a square piano.

English double action with check, c. 1830 (developed from Geib, 1786

American single action with overdamper, c. 1870 (developed from Petzold, 1809)

Zumpe single action, 1766

Erard double pilot action, 1790 "Zumpe's second action" c. 1788

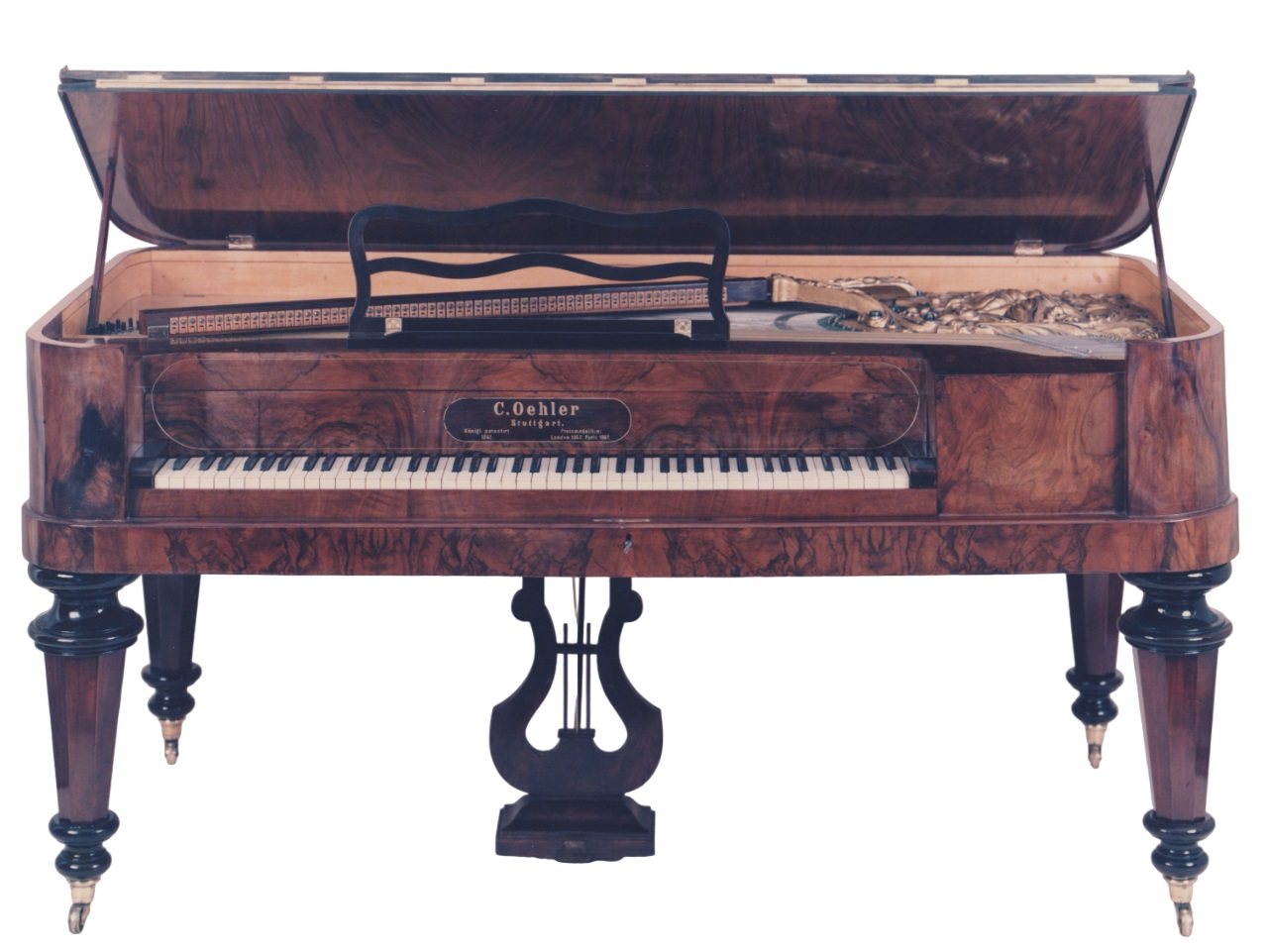
Square piano C. Oehler Stuttgart, 1870s

== See also ==
- Fortepiano
- Clavichord, a similar structured keyboard
- Finchcocks, a collection of early keyboard instruments in Kent which has many original square pianos
