= Thomas Clifford-Constable =

British landowner & MP (1807-1870)

Sir Thomas Aston Clifford-Constable 2nd Baronet
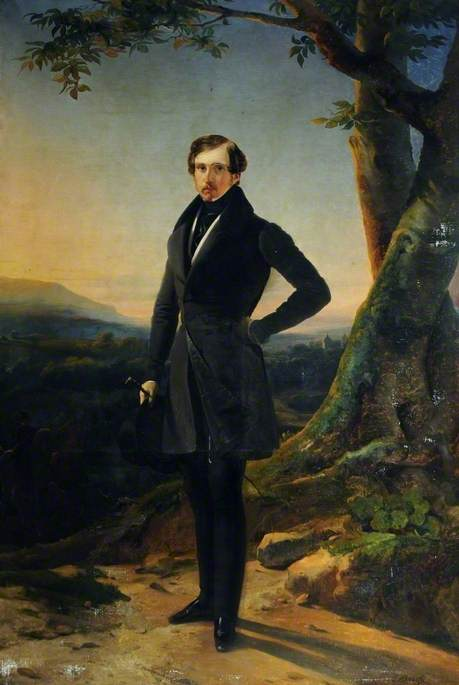

Member of Parliament for Hedon
- In office 1830–1832 Serving with Robert Farrand
- Preceded by: Thomas Hyde Villiers; John Baillie
- Succeeded by: Constituency abolished

Personal details
- Born: 3 May 1807 Tixall, Staffordshire, England
- Died: 22 December 1870 (aged 63) Burton Constable Hall, East Riding of Yorkshire, England
- Party: Tory
- Spouse(s): Marianne Chichester; Rosina Brandon
- Children: 1
- Parents: Thomas Hugh Clifford-Constable (father); Mary Macdonald (mother)
- Military career
- Allegiance: United Kingdom
- Branch: British Army
- Service years: 1834
- Rank: Captain
- Unit: North York Light Infantry Militia

Sir Thomas Aston Clifford-Constable, 2nd Baronet (3 May 1807 – 22 December 1870) was a British landowner and Member of Parliament.

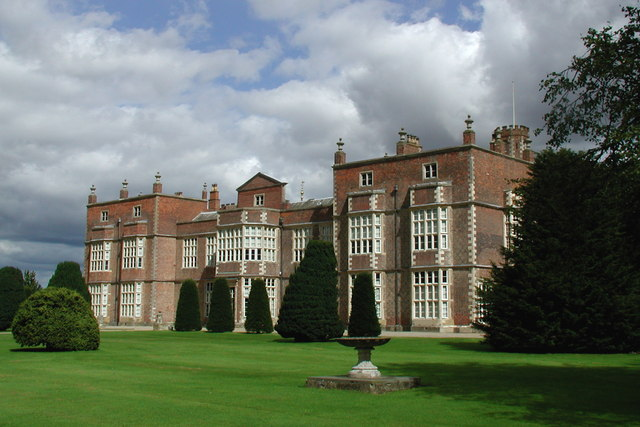
Burton Constable Hall

== Life ==
He was born in 1807. He was the only son of Mary Macdonald and Sir Thomas Hugh Clifford-Constable, 1st Baronet of Tixall, Staffordshire who he succeeded in 1823. His elder sister was the diarist Mary Barbara Clifford. The family had descended from the Barons Clifford and had adopted the Constable name on inheriting the Burton Constable estate near Hull. On his coming of age in 1828 Thomas inherited not only Tixall Hall, the family seat, but also Burton Constable Hall and an estate at Wycliffe, County Durham. He moved the family seat to Burton Constable and sold Tixall Hall to Earl Talbot in 1835.

He represented the rotten borough of Hedon as Member of Parliament from 1830 to 1832 and was appointed high Sheriff of Yorkshire for 1840–41. He was commissioned as a Captain in the disembodied North York Light Infantry Militia in 1834.

He died a wealthy man in December 1870. He had married twice: firstly Marianne, the daughter of Charles Joseph Chichester of Calverleigh Court, Devon, with whom he had a son and secondly Rosina, the daughter of Charles Brandon. He was succeeded by his only son Frederick Augustus Talbot Constable (1828–94).

Parliament of the United Kingdom
Preceded by Thomas Hyde Villiers; John Baillie	Member of Parliament for Hedon; 1830–1832; With: Robert Farrand	Constituency abolished
Baronetage of the United Kingdom
Preceded by Thomas Hugh Clifford-Constable	Baronet (of Tixall); 1829–1870	Succeeded by Frederick Augustus Talbot Clifford-Constable
