= James Aston =

James Aston may refer to:

- Jack Aston (1877–1934), English footballer
- James Aston, 5th Lord Aston of Forfar (1723–1751)
