= Clifford-Constable baronets =

Extinct baronetcy in the Baronetage of the United Kingdom

The Clifford-Constable Baronetcy, of Tixall in the County of Staffordshire was given to Thomas Hugh Clifford-Constable, originally Thomas Hugh Constable Clifford. The title in the Baronetage of the United Kingdom was created on 22 May 1815 and at the request of Louis XVIII.

His father Thomas Clifford (1732–1787), who married Barbara Aston of Tixall Hall, was a son of Hugh Clifford, 3rd Baron Clifford of Chudleigh and younger brother of the 4th Baron Clifford of Chudleigh. He changed his name to Clifford-Constable, in 1821. His son the 2nd Baronet inherited Burton Constable Hall from a cousin at the age of seventeen in 1823. Following marriage he sold Tixall Hall and moved the family seat to Burton Constable. He was MP for Hedon for 1830–1832 and High Sheriff of Yorkshire for 1840–1841.

The baronetcy became extinct on the death of the 3rd Baronet on 24 October 1894.

== Clifford-Constable baronets, of Tixall (1815) ==
- Sir Thomas Hugh Clifford-Constable, 1st Baronet (1762–1829)
- Sir Thomas Aston Clifford-Constable, 2nd Baronet (1807–1870)
- Sir Frederick Augustus Talbot Clifford-Constable, 3rd Baronet (1828–1894), extinct 1894

== Coat of arms ==
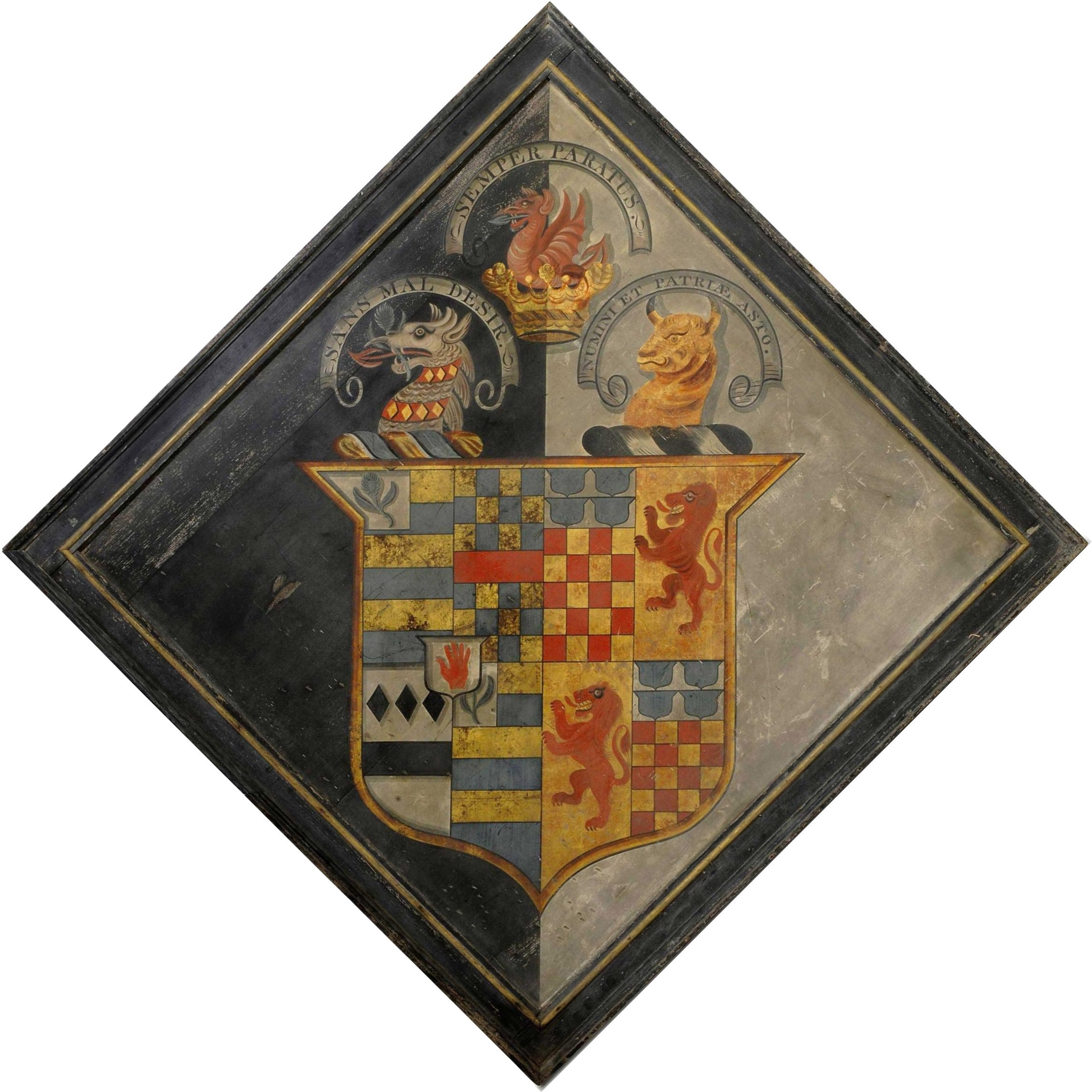
Funerary hatchment of Sir Thomas Hugh Clifford-Constable, 1st Baronet, displaying his arms impaling the arms of his wife, Mary Mcdonald Chichester

Coat of arms of Clifford-Constable baronets
| Crest A dragon's head barry of six argent and gules charged with nine lozenges or, holding a teazle ppr. Escutcheon Barry of six or and azure, on a canton argent a Fuller's teazle ppr. Motto Semper paratus |

== See also ==
- Clifford baronets
- Baron Clifford of Chudleigh
- Lord Aston of Forfar

== Notes ==
Baronetage of the United Kingdom
| Preceded by Campbell baronets | Clifford-Constable baronets of Tixall; 22 May 1815 | Succeeded by Domvile baronets |
