= Sir Thomas Clifford-Constable, 1st Baronet =

English topographer and botanist (1762-1823)

Thomas Clifford-Constable 1st Baronet
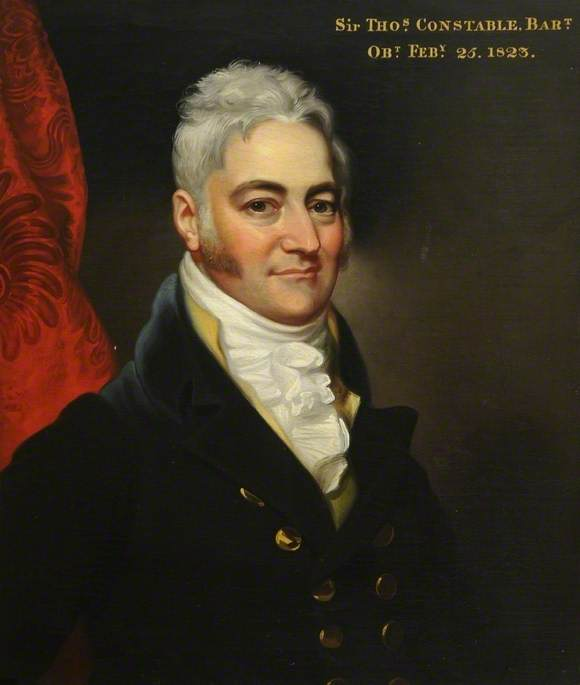
- Born: 1762
- Died: 26 February 1823 (aged 61); Ghent, Belgium
- Occupations: Topographer and botanist
- Spouse: Mary Macdonald (m. 1791)
- Parents: Thomas Clifford (father); Barbara Aston (mother)
- Relatives: Henry Clifford (brother); Arthur Clifford (brother); Mary Chichester (daughter); Thomas Clifford-Constable (son); Hugh Clifford (paternal grandfather); James Aston (maternal grandfather)

Sir Thomas Clifford-Constable, 1st Baronet (1762–1823) was an English topographer and botanist.

== Life ==
He was born as Thomas Clifford into a Roman Catholic family, the eldest son of Thomas Clifford, fourth son of Hugh Clifford, 3rd Baron Clifford of Chudleigh, and his wife Barbara Aston, youngest daughter of James Aston, 5th Lord Aston of Forfar; among his brothers were Henry Clifford, the second son, and Arthur Clifford. He was educated at a Jesuit academy in Liège, going on to the College de Navarre, in Paris. He then made a walking tour in Switzerland.

Left an orphan in 1787, Clifford settled at Tixall, Staffordshire, on the Aston estate that he had inherited from his mother.

Residing at Bath, Somerset, Clifford welcomed French emigrés. When Louis XVIII visited Bath in 1813, a few months before the Bourbon Restoration, he twice invited Clifford to dine. By patent dated 22 May 1816, Clifford was created a baronet, at the request of Louis XVIII. According to Goldbloom, he was a fervent Catholic, reputedly a disciple of Abbé Guy-Toussaint-Julien Carron in London. In the 1806 general election he with his brother Henry were behind the successful nomination in the Stafford constituency of Richard Mansel Philipps, a Whig radical.

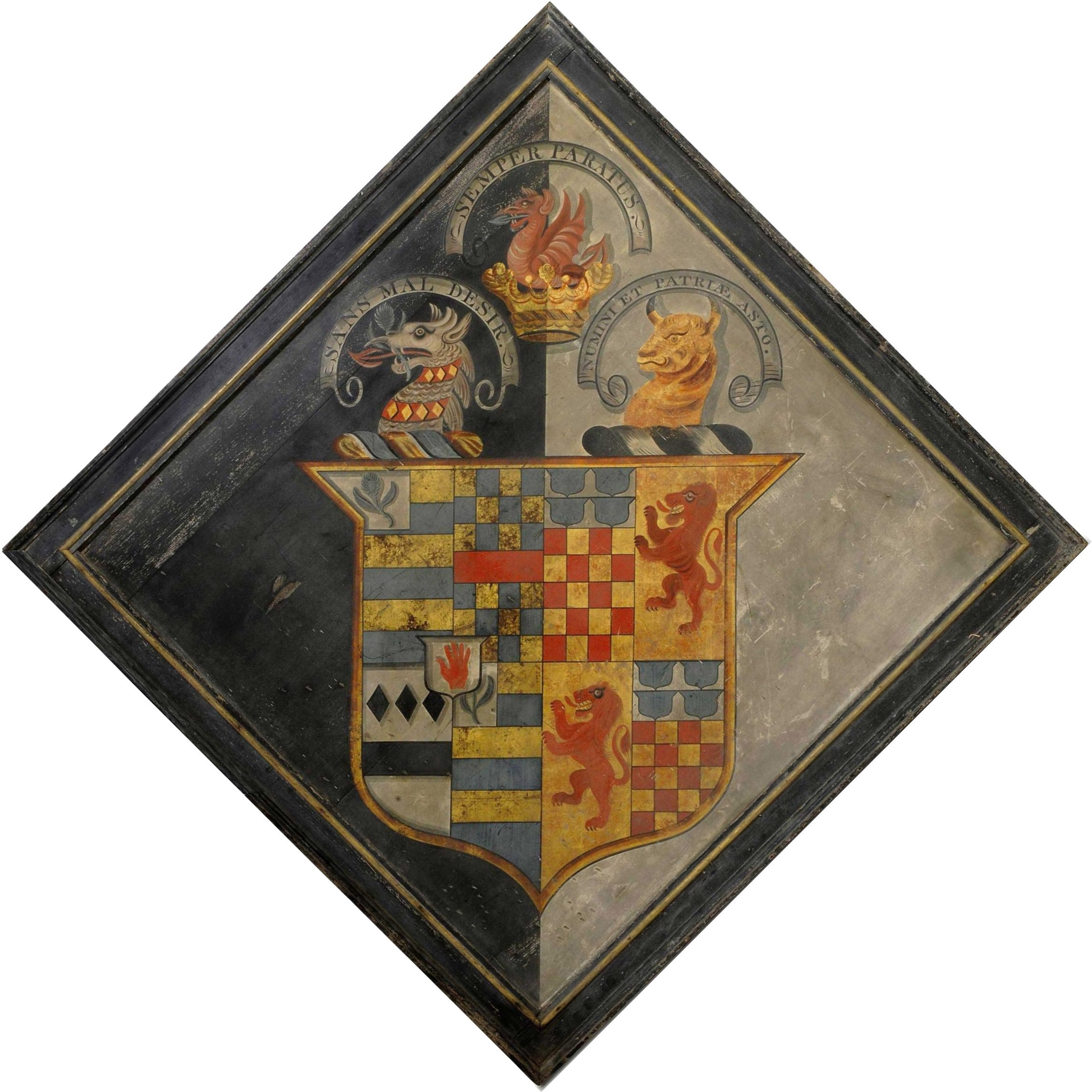
A funerary hatchment painted with the arms of Sir Thomas Hugh Constable 1st Bt. and his wife Mary

In 1821 Clifford succeeded to the estates of Francis Constable of Burton Constable and Wycliffe Hall. Two years later he was, by royal sign-manual, permitted to take the name of Constable only. He died at Ghent on 26 February 1823.

== Works ==
Clifford-Constable published:

- Flora Tixalliana, appended to Historical and Topographical Description of the Parish of Tixall (Paris, 1817, privately printed), with his brother Arthur Clifford.
- Meditations on the Divinity and Passion of Christ, self-published, an English translation of part of his work L'Evangile Médité written in French.

He translated La Fontaine's Fables into English verse; and composed a complete set of metrical Psalms.

== Family ==
Clifford married in 1791 Mary Macdonald, second daughter of John Chichester of Arlington, Devon. Their children included the diarist Mary Chichester, wife of Charles Chichester, and Sir Thomas Clifford-Constable, 2nd Baronet, a Member of Parliament.

== Notes ==
Baronetage of the United Kingdom
Preceded by New creation	Baronet (of Tixall); 1815–1829	Succeeded by Thomas Clifford-Constable
