= Walter Aston, 9th Lord Aston of Forfar =

Walter Aston, 9th Lord Aston of Forfar (15 September 1769 – 21 January 1845) was a son of Walter Aston, 8th Lord Aston of Forfar, and Anne Hutchinson. He was an ordained clergyman of the Church of England, and became the Vicar of Tardebigge, Worcestershire and Tamworth, Warwickshire.

He married on 15 June 1802, Elizabeth Haines, daughter of Rev. Nathan Haines.

In 1805, he succeeded his father as Lord Aston of Forfar in the peerage of Scotland. While he assumed and bore the title of Lord Aston of Forfar, and it was recorded by the County of Worcester, he presented a petition in 1819 to be officially declared Baron Aston of Forfar, for which no decision was made.

He and his wife had no children. She died in 1833, and he died on 21 January 1845, when his title fell into abeyance and became extinct.

Peerage of Scotland
Preceded by Walter Aston	Lord Aston of Forfar; 1805–1845	Extinct
