= Robert de More =

English cleric (fl. 1370s)

Robert de More (fl. 1370s) was a Canon of Windsor in 1376 and Dean of Stafford from 1374 to 1377

== Career ==
He was appointed:

- Rector of Buckland, Gloucestershire
- Dean of Stafford 1374 - 1377

He was appointed to the second stall in St George's Chapel, Windsor Castle in 1376. His length of tenure is not certain, but his stall was occupied by William Almary in 1380.
