= William de Pakyngton =

William de Pakyngton (also William Pakington) (fl. 1370s - 1390s) was a Canon of Windsor in 1381 and Dean of Lichfield.

== Career ==
He was appointed:

- King's Clerk
- Rector of Burton Noveree (diocese of Lincoln) until 1372
- Keeper of the King's Wardrobe 1377
- Prebendary of Mapesbury in St Paul's until 1390
- Dean of St Martin's le Grand 1389 - 1390
- Parson at Ivinghoe (diocese of Lincoln) 1381
- Rector of Wearmouth (diocese of Durham) 1381 - 1382
- Chancellor of the Exchequer 1381
- Prebendary of Waltham in Chichester 1385 - 1391
- Dean of Lichfield 1381 - 1390
- Dean of Stafford 1380 - 1390

He was appointed to the twelfth stall in St George's Chapel, Windsor Castle in 1381 and held the canonry only for one month.
