= James Aston, 5th Lord Aston of Forfar =

Scottish peer (1723–1751)

The Right Honourable James Aston
- Lord Aston of Forfar
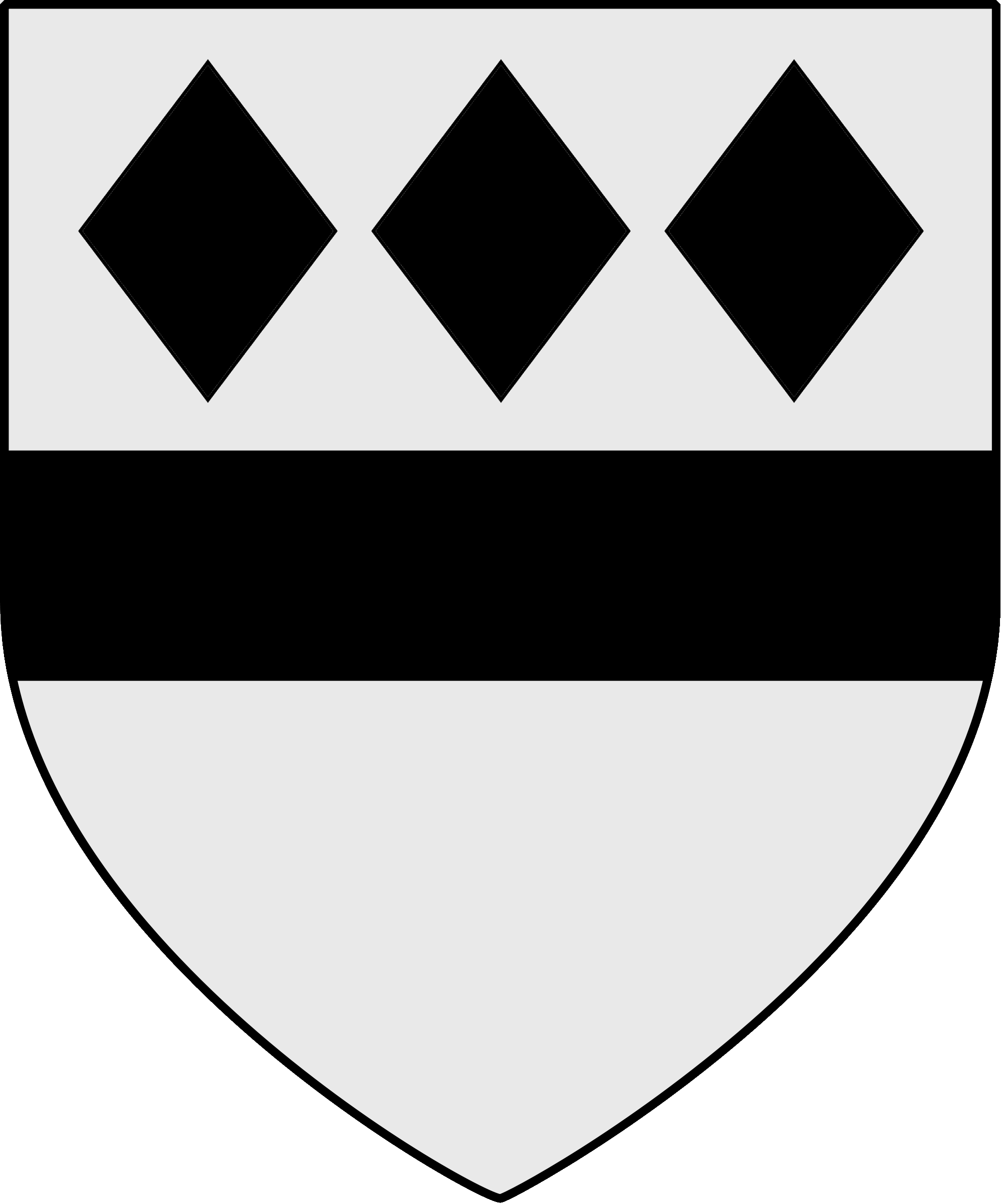
- Coat of arms
- Reign: George II
- Predecessor: Walter Aston, 4th Lord Aston of Forfar
- Born: 23 May 1723
- Died: 24 August 1751 (aged 28); Tixall
- Buried: St Mary's Church, Stafford
- Residence: Tixall Hall; Standon Lordship
- Noble family: Aston
- Spouse: Barbara Talbot (m. 1742)
- Issue: Mary Aston; Barbara Aston
- Father: Walter Aston, 4th Lord Aston of Forfar
- Mother: Mary Howard

James Aston, 5th Lord Aston of Forfar (23 May 1723 – 24 August 1751), was the 5th, but 1st surviving son of Walter Aston, 4th Lord Aston of Forfar, and Lady Mary Howard.

In 1748, he succeeded his father as Lord Aston of Forfar in the Peerage of Scotland.

Noted "for his good humour and easy temper, and for his affability and condescension to all ranks of people," he lived in retirement at Standon Lordship, owing to the severity of the penal laws that restricted the rights of Roman Catholics.

== Marriage ==
On 30 June 1742 at Twickenham, he married Lady Barbara Talbot (d. 1759), sister of the 14th Earl of Shrewsbury, eldest daughter of George Talbot, by Mary, daughter of Thomas FitzWilliam, 4th Viscount FitzWilliam, with whom he had two daughters:

- Mary Aston, born at Standon on 14 August 1743; married at Worksop Manor, Nottinghamshire, the seat of Edward Howard, 9th Duke of Norfolk, on 21 September 1766, to her cousin. Sir Walter Blount, 6th Baronet (d. 1785), by whom she had issue. He died at L'Isle, in French Flanders on 5 October 1785. She was accidentally burnt to death at the house of her son, George Blount, on 30 January 1805 and was buried in St. Mary's, Stafford.
- Barbara Aston, born on 4 September 1744, at Standon; she inherited the estates of Tixall and Standon; the latter was sold in 1767. She married at St. James', Westminster on 2 February 1762, Thomas Clifford, posthumous son of Hugh Clifford, 3rd Baron Clifford of Chudleigh, by whom she had issue:
  - Sir Thomas Clifford-Constable, 1st Baronet, eldest son, inherited Tixall, and was, at the request of Louis XVIII of France, created a Baronet in 1815. The Tixall estate was sold by his descendants to the Earl of Shrewsbury.
  - Henry Clifford, 2nd son.
  - Arthur Clifford, 6th son, edited The State Papers and Letters of Sir Ralph Sadler in 1809.

She died on 2 August 1786, and was buried in St. Mary's, Stafford. He died 16 June 1787.

== Death ==
He died at the age of 28 of smallpox at Tixall on 24 August 1751 and was buried at St Mary's Church, Stafford. Lady Aston died in Paris on 9 November 1759.

On the death of the 5th lord without male issue, the Peerage became dormant, and the Baronetcy became extinct. In accordance with the terms of the patent, the Peerage devolved upon the heir male general of the grantee. Philip Aston, "the great-great grandson of the late Lord's great-great-great-grand uncle, William Aston of Milwich", styling himself Lord Aston of Forfar, a distant cousin, wrongly supposed himself to be the heir male.

== See also ==
- Lord Aston of Forfar

== Notes ==
Peerage of Scotland
Preceded by Walter Aston	Lord Aston of Forfar; 1748–1751	Extinct
