= Charles Chichester =

British army officer (1795–1847)

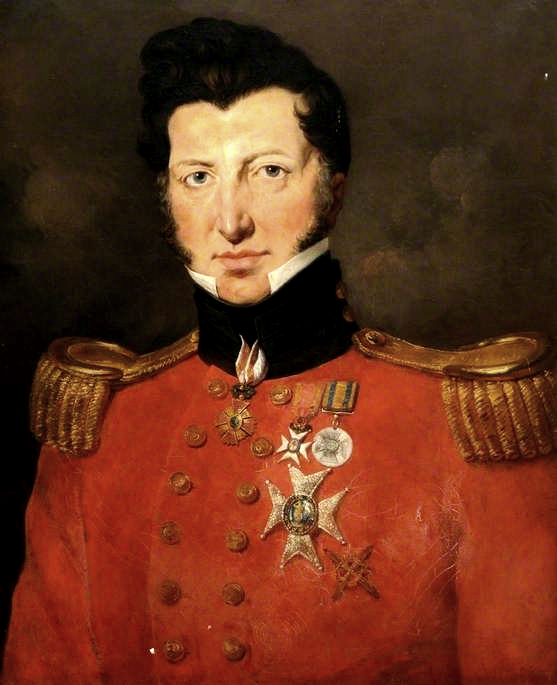
Charles Chichester

Sir Charles Chichester (16 March 1795 – 4 April 1847) was a British army officer, known in particular for his service in the British Auxiliary Legion in Spain under George de Lacy Evans.

== Early life ==
He was born 16 March 1795, the second son of Charles Joseph Chichester of Calverleigh Court, Devon, and his wife Honoria French, daughter of Thomas French of Rahasane, County Galway. He was educated at Stonyhurst College, and then was appointed ensign in the 14th Foot in March 1811.

Chichester became lieutenant in 1812. He served with the second battalion of his regiment in the Mediterranean: Malta, Sicily, Genoa and Marseilles. It was disbanded in December 1817, and he was transferred with many others to the 1st battalion, with which he served some years in India. He exchanged in 1821, as lieutenant, to the 2nd (then light infantry) battalion of the 60th Foot, in North America.

In 1824 Chichester became captain, by purchase; and major in 1826. After commanding the depot of the 2nd battalion, at the time recently transformed into a rifle corps, for several years, he obtained a lieutenant-colonelcy, unattached, 12 July 1831.

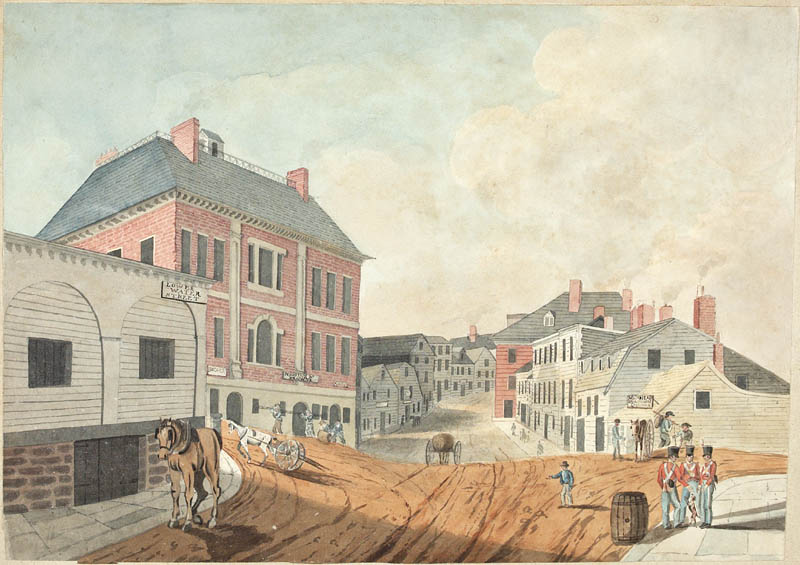
Watercolour of Halifax, Nova Scotia by Charles Chichester from 1823

== In Spain ==
In 1835, Chichester was appointed brigadier-general in the British Auxiliary Legion in Spain, commanded by General George de Lacy Evans. The conflict was the First Carlist War, and in line with British foreign policy under the second Melbourne ministry, the Legion fought on the liberal side. According to Mansfield "The British Legion had mixed fortunes fighting in the Basque country." There were mutinies when local supplies failed, but the Legion did manage to hold back the fierce Carlist forces.

Chichester fought in the action at Hernani on 30 August 1835, where he received two wounds, and at the relief of Bilbao in the same year. He commanded a brigade at Mendigur and at Azua in January 1836; and in the action on the heights above San Sebastián on 5 May; and the passage of the Urumea on 28 May following (earning a medal). He commanded at Alza when it was attacked by the Carlists in June 1836, and the legion behaved with distinguished gallantry. Chichester was also engaged at Ametza in October the same year; and in the operations of 10–15 March 1837, where his horse was killed under him; and in the general action of 16 March, where he had two horses killed and was himself wounded.

In the absence of General Evans through illness, Chichester commanded the whole Legion, then reduced to a division of two brigades, in the action of 14 May 1837, and in the attack and capture of Irun on 16–17 May. On that occasion he received the Carlist commandant's sword and the keys of the town, and earned a further medal.

After experiencing heavy casualties, especially in the battle of Andoain, the Legion was disbanded in December 1837. Chichester's services to Queen Isabella II were recognised with the Laureate Cross of Saint Ferdinand and other honours. He then returned to the United Kingdom.

== Later life ==
Chichester was appointed lieutenant-colonel 81st Foot on 25 October 1839, and was knighted at St James's Palace in 1840. He commanded the 81st for several years in the West Indies and America. During this period he acted as lieutenant-governor of Trinidad from 8 August 1842 to 3 May 1843.

Sir Charles Chichester died at Toronto, Upper Canada, after a few days’ illness, on 4 April 1847. As a commander, he took seriously the doctrine of Field Exercise and Evolutions of the Army (1824), the revision of field training exercises by Sir Henry Torrens, Adjutant-General to the Forces. It combined experience gained in the Peninsular War with thought on the requirements of colonial warfare. Henry Manners Chichester in the Dictionary of National Biography commented on Chichester's "ideas of tactical instruction far in advance of the practice of his day".

== Family ==
In 1826 Chichester married his cousin, Mary Barbara, elder daughter of Sir Thomas Clifford-Constable, 1st Baronet, with whom he had a numerous family. From 11 children, five survived childhood. Three sons became army officers:

- Charles Raleigh Chichester (1830–1891), married Mary Josephine Balfe, and was a landowner in County Roscommon
- Hugh Arthur Chichester (born 1833)
- Henry Augustus Chichester (born 1846)
