= Anthony Aston =

English actor and dramatist

Anthony Aston (died 1731) was an English actor and dramatist.

== Life ==
He began to be known on the London stage in the early years of the 18th century. He had tried the law and other professions, which he finally abandoned for the theatre. He had some success as a dramatic author, writing Love in a Hurry (performed in Dublin about 1709) and Pastora, or the Coy Shepherdess, an opera in 1712. For many years he toured the English provinces with his wife and son, producing pieces which he himself wrote, or medleys from various plays fitted together with songs and dialogues of his own.

Aston wrote a A Brief Supplement to Colley Cibbey, Esq, somewhat in the manner of Colley Cibber's famous work. The 24-page pamphlet contains interesting comments on Betterton, Mrs. Bracegirdle, Underhill, Doggett, and a few others.

Aston was a friend of the Scottish poet and dramatist Allan Ramsay. His company played at Old Magazine-House in the Canongate, Edinburgh, in the winter of 1725 before going on tour. It returned to Edinburgh in 1726, basing itself at Skinner's Hall, in Skinner's Close, off the High Street. The company was subsequently locked out of the building by the city's magistrates and left Edinburgh in 1728, beginning a tour at the tolbooth in Falkirk.

His son Walter Aston began as a child actor appearing in his father's plays before eventually joining the Covent Garden Theatre company during the 1730s.
