= Walter Aston, 4th Lord Aston of Forfar =

The Right Honourable Walter Aston
- Lord Aston of Forfar
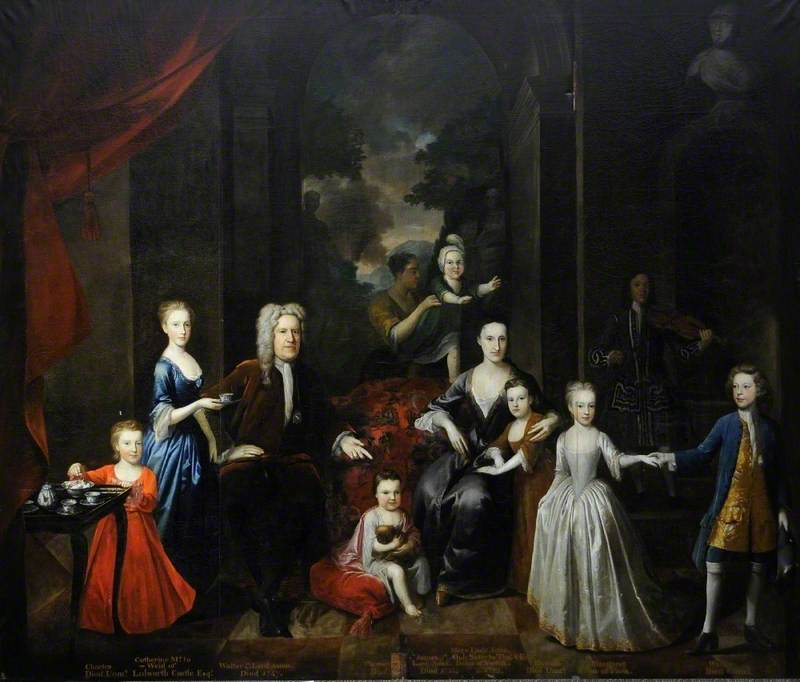
- Walter Aston, 4th Lord Aston, His Wife Mary and Their Seven Children, c. 1725 by Richard van Bleeck

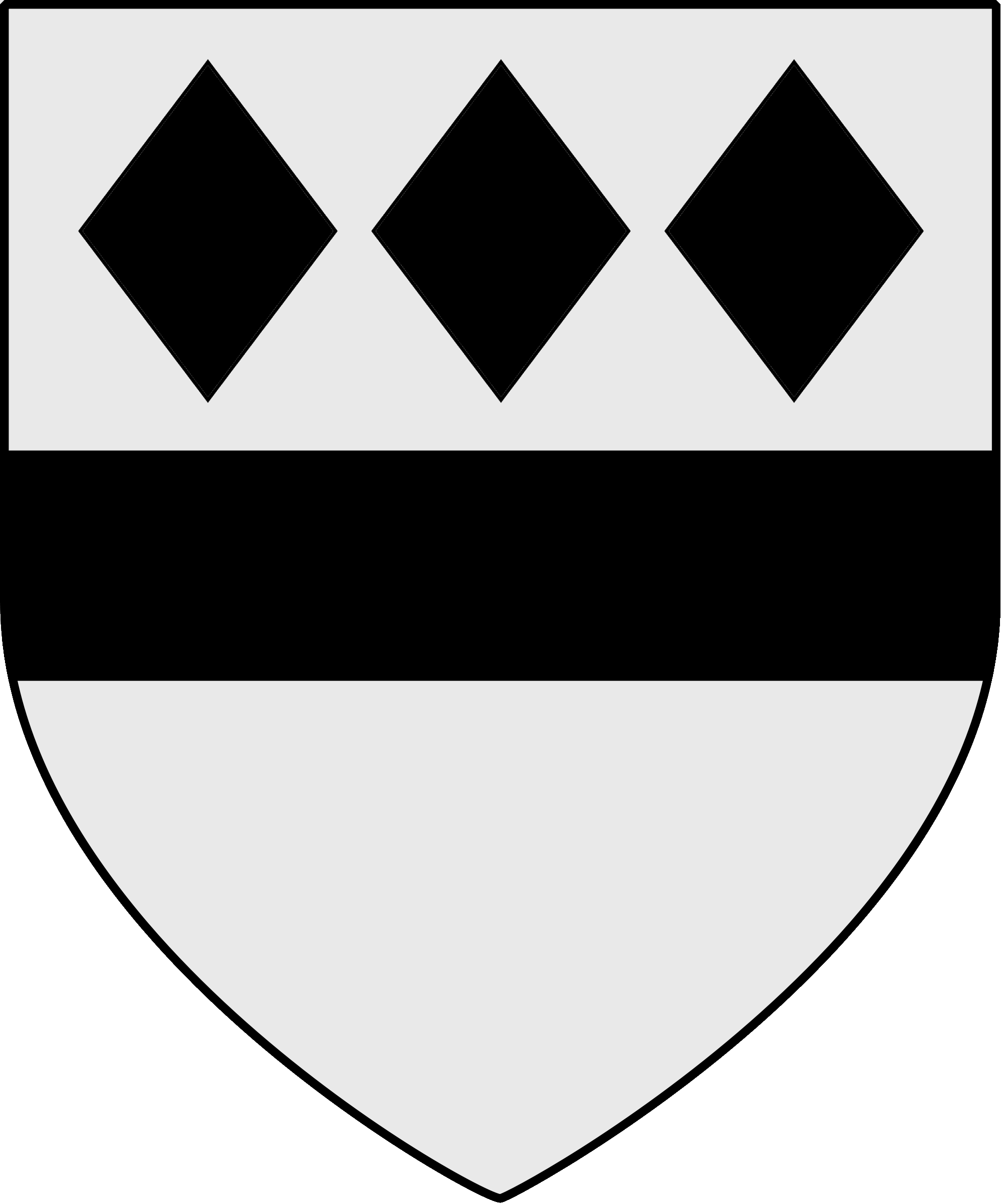
- Coat of arms
- Reign: George I; George II
- Predecessor: Walter Aston, 3rd Lord Aston of Forfar
- Successor: James Aston, 5th Lord Aston of Forfar
- Born: c. 1660
- Died: 4 April 1748 (aged 87–88); Tixall
- Buried: 8 April 1748; St Mary's Church, Standon, Hertfordshire
- Residence: Tixall Hall; Standon Lordship
- Noble family: Aston
- Spouse: Mary Howard (m. 1698; died 1723)
- Issue: Walter Aston; Edward Richard Aston; Thomas William Anthony Aston; Charles Joseph Aston; James Aston, 5th Lord Aston of Forfar; Mary Aston; Anne Aston; Catherine Elizabeth Aston; Mary Anne Aston; Margaret Aston; Elianora Aston
- Father: Walter Aston, 3rd Lord Aston of Forfar
- Mother: Eleanor Blount

Walter Aston, 4th Lord Aston of Forfar (c. 1660 – 4 April 1748) was the eldest surviving son of Walter Aston, 3rd Lord Aston of Forfar, and his first wife Eleanor Blount, daughter of Sir Walter Blount, 1st Baronet of Sodington in Worcestershire.

In 1714, he succeeded his father as Lord Aston of Forfar in the Peerage of Scotland. Despite the title, they were a Staffordshire family whose seat was at Tixall.

== Marriage and family ==
He married, about 1 October 1698, Lady Mary Howard (d. 23 May 1723), daughter of Lord Thomas Howard and Mary Savile, and sister of Thomas Howard, 8th Duke of Norfolk and Edward Howard, 9th Duke of Norfolk. Together, they had five sons and six daughters, most of whom died in infancy:

- Walter Aston, born 16 February 1711, died 19 June 1717, buried at Standon.
- Edward Richard Aston, born 17 January 1713, died young.
- Thomas William Anthony Aston, died between 16 June and 25 October 1739.
- Charles Joseph Aston, born 19 March 1719, died 12 April and buried at Standon 15 April 1730.
- James Aston, 5th Lord Aston of Forfar
- Mary Aston, born 27 October 1703, died 10 December 1704, buried at Standon.
- Anne Aston, born 4 April, died 24 July 1705, buried at Standon.
- Catherine Elizabeth Aston, born 7 March 1708, married Edward Weld of Lulworth Castle, Dorset; she died 25 October and was buried at Standon 27 October 1739.
- Mary Anne Aston, born May 1709, died 2 April 1712, buried at Standon.
- Margaret Aston born 28 May 1714, living unmarried August 1747. She became a nun at Paris.
- Elianora Aston, born 22 May 1717, died 1 February 1727-28, buried at Standon.

His wife died in 1723 during the birth of their 11th child, James, who would succeed him as Lord Aston of Forfar. Two daughters also reached adult life: Margaret, who became a nun, and Catherine, who married Edward Weld of Lulworth Castle, Dorset. The Astons, like the Howards, were staunch Roman Catholics: during the outbreak of anti-Catholic hysteria called the Popish Plot, Walter's father and uncle had been charged with treason and imprisoned in the Tower of London, although they were never brought to trial, and in due course were simply released.

The 4th Lord Aston commissioned a painting of himself, his wife, and seven of their children by Richard van Bleeck. The painting, which survives, was not completed until two years after Lady Aston's death.

== Death ==
He died at the age of 87 or 88 at Tixall on 4 April and was buried on 8 April 1748 at St Mary's Church, Standon. He was succeeded by his fifth but only surviving son, James Aston, 5th Lord Aston of Forfar.

== Notes ==
Peerage of Scotland
Preceded by Walter Aston	Lord Aston of Forfar; 1714–1748	Succeeded by James Aston
