= Walter Aston (actor) =

British stage actor

Walter Aston (c.1706–1739) was a British stage actor of the eighteenth century.

He was the son of the actor Anthony Aston, and he began as a child actor in his father's productions where he was often billed as Aston Junior. His earliest role was probably in Dublin, and he toured Britain with his parents. From at least 1732 he joined John Rich's company at Covent Garden Theatre where he worked until 1738. He tended to specialise in playing elderly roles, often in Shakespeare adaptations.

== Bibliography ==
- Highfill, Philip H, Burnim, Kalman A. & Langhans, Edward A. A Biographical Dictionary of Actors, Actresses, Musicians, Dancers, Managers, and Other Stage Personnel in London, 1660–1800: Garrick to Gyngell. SIU Press, 1978.
