= Walter Aston, 3rd Lord Aston of Forfar =

The Right Honourable Walter Aston
- Lord Aston of Forfar
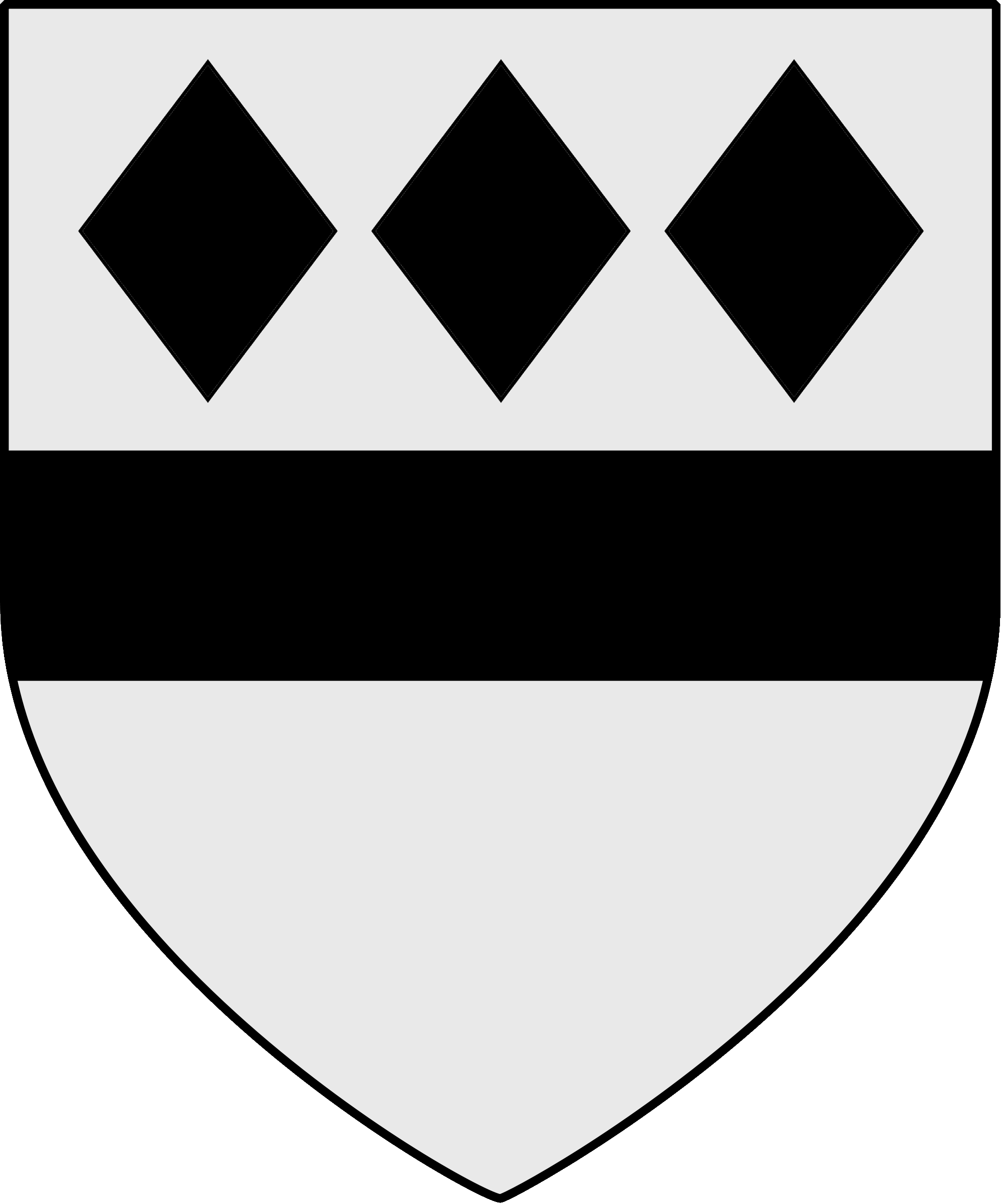
- Coat of arms
- Reign: Charles II; James II; Mary II & William III
- Predecessor: Walter Aston, 2nd Lord Aston of Forfar
- Successor: Walter Aston, 4th Lord Aston of Forfar
- Born: 1633; Tixall
- Died: 24 November 1714 (aged 80–81)
- Buried: St Mary's Church, Standon, Hertfordshire
- Residence: Tixall Hall; Standon Lordship
- Noble family: Aston
- Spouses: Eleanor Blount (m. 1657; died 1674) Catherine Gage (after 1680)
- Issue: with Eleanor: Edward Walter Aston; Francis Aston; Walter Aston, 4th Lord Aston of Forfar; Charles Aston; William Aston; Mary Aston; Catherine Aston
- Father: Walter Aston, 2nd Lord Aston of Forfar
- Mother: Mary Weston

Walter Aston, 3rd Lord Aston of Forfar (1633 – 24 November 1714) was the eldest son of Walter Aston, 2nd Lord Aston of Forfar, and Lady Mary Weston, daughter of Richard Weston, 1st Earl of Portland. He is best remembered today as a fortunate survivor of the Popish Plot.

He succeeded his father as Lord Aston of Forfar in the peerage of Scotland in 1678; he resided mainly at Tixall in Staffordshire. He also owned an estate at Standon in Hertfordshire, which came to the Aston family by inheritance from Ralph Sadleir in 1661.

== Family ==
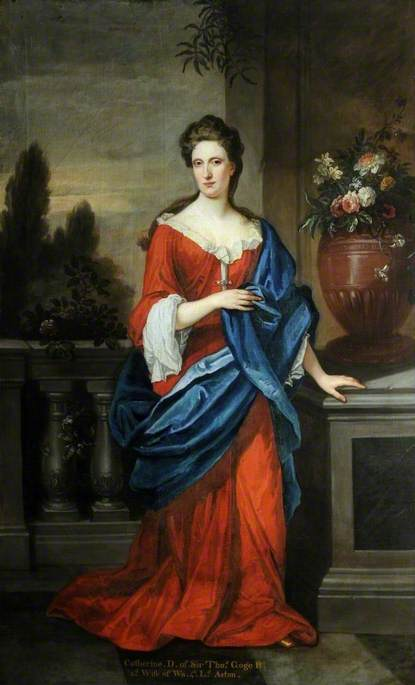
Catherine, Daughter of Sir Thomas Gage and Second Wife of Walter, 3rd Lord Aston of Tixall, Godfrey Kneller (school of)

He was twice married, first marrying, in 1657, Eleanor Blount (d. 3 December 1674), widow of Robert Knightley, and daughter of Sir Walter Blount, 1st Baronet of Sodington in Worcestershire, and Elizabeth Wylde, daughter of George Wylde. By Eleanor, he had five sons and two daughters:

- Edward Walter, born 1658, died at Clermont College, Paris, 1678, unmarried.
- Francis Aston, died s.p. 1694, buried at Standon.
- Walter Aston, 4th Lord Aston of Forfar
- Charles Aston, born 1664, captain of the band of pensioners to James II, in whose service he was killed at the Battle of the Boyne, 1 July 1690, unmarried.
- William Aston, died an infant.
- Mary Aston, died unmarried.
- Catherine Aston, died an infant.

He married secondly, after 1680, Catherine Gage (d. 2 April 1720), daughter of Sir Thomas Gage, 2nd Baronet of Firle in Sussex and Mary Chamberlain of Sherborne Castle, by whom he had no children.

== Popish Plot ==
Like his father, he was an ardent Roman Catholic, and succeeded in his father's role as the unofficial leader of the large Catholic community in Staffordshire. As such, he was a principal target of the informers during the Popish Plot. His former steward Stephen Dugdale, whom he had dismissed for stealing money to pay his gambling debts, turned on him and gave perjured evidence which sent Aston and his brother William to the Tower of London in 1679 on charges of conspiracy to kill King Charles II Dugdale was a charming, educated and plausible man, who made a noticeably different impression on the Government from the unsavoury parade of previous informers like Titus Oates and Thomas Dangerfield, some of whom were notorious criminals. Even Charles II, who had been entirely sceptical about the Plot, was so impressed by Dugdale that "he began to think there was somewhat in it (the Plot)".

In the event, it proved impossible to find a second witness to the charge of treason against Lord Aston, and even at the height of the Plot hysteria, the judges scrupulously observed the rule that a charge of treason required two witnesses. Aston was never brought to trial, and was released on bail in the summer of 1680. He never returned to prison.

== Later years ==
Under the Catholic King James II he was in favour at court, and served as Lord Lieutenant of Staffordshire from 1687 to 1689. After the Glorious Revolution, he remained loyal to James, but no action was taken against him as a result. In his last years, he felt sufficiently secure in his position to complain about his exclusion, on the grounds of his religion, from the House of Lords. As his peerage was a Scots title he argued that he should be one of the Scottish representative peers who took their seats in the unified House of Lords after the Act of Union 1707, but his claim to be entitled to sit in the Lords was rejected.

He died on 24 November 1714 and was buried at Standon. He was succeeded by his third but eldest surviving son Walter Aston, 4th Lord Aston of Forfar. A younger son, Charles Aston, served with the British Army in Ireland and was killed in action at the Battle of the Boyne, 1 July 1690. His widow died on 2 April 1720, and was also buried at Standon.

== Notes ==
Honorary titles
Preceded by The Lord Ferrers	Lord Lieutenant of Staffordshire; 1687–1689	Succeeded by The Lord Paget
Preceded by The Earl of Shrewsbury	Custos Rotulorum of Staffordshire; 1688–1689	Succeeded by The Lord Paget
Peerage of Scotland
Preceded by Walter Aston	Lord Aston of Forfar; 1678–1714	Succeeded by Walter Aston
