= Walter Aston, 8th Lord Aston of Forfar =

Walter Aston
- 8th Lord Aston of Forfar
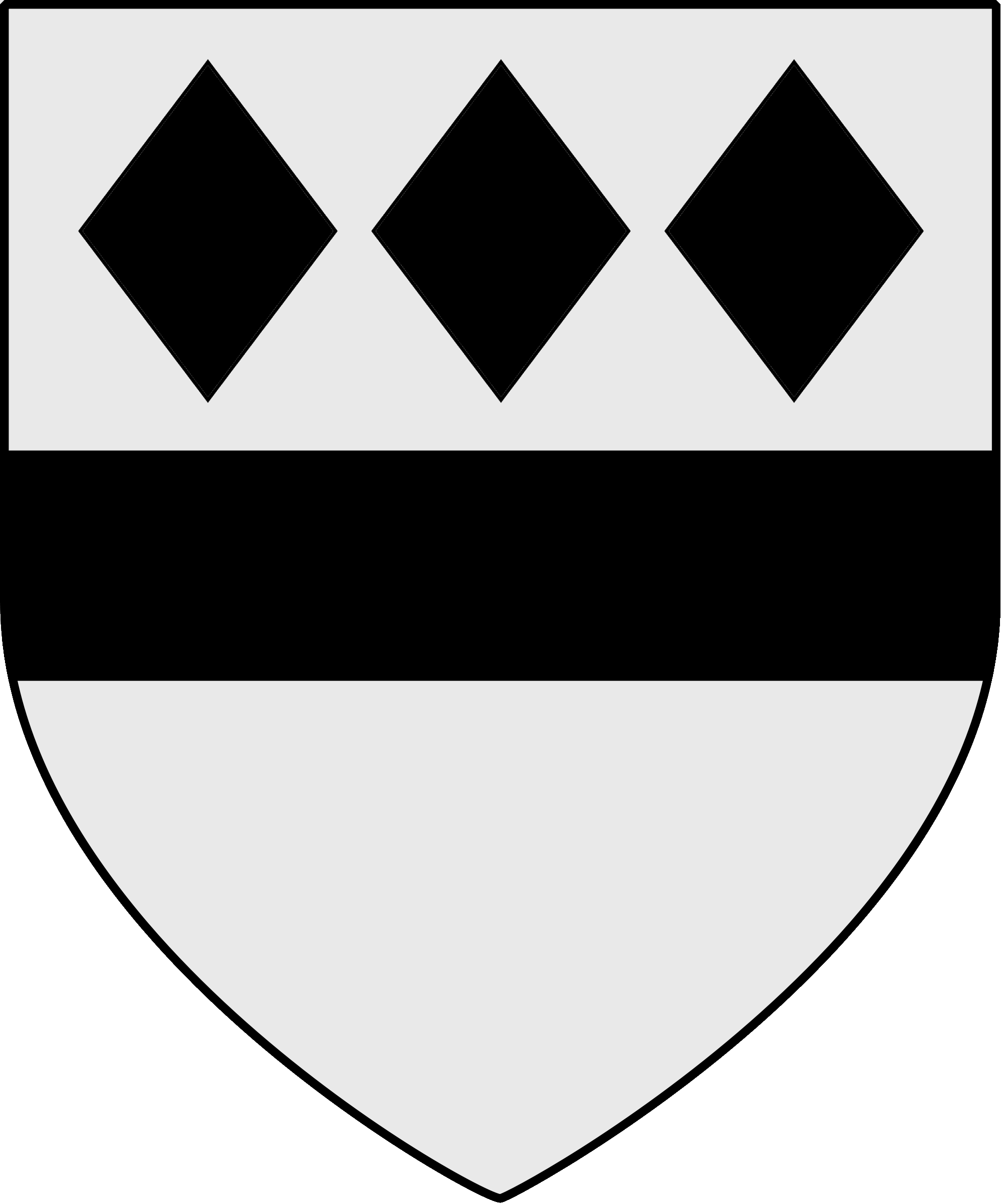
- Coat of arms

Walter Aston, 8th Lord Aston of Forfar (10 October 1732 – 29 July 1805) was the son of Edward Aston and Anne Bayley.

In 1763, Walter succeeded his childless cousin Walter Aston, 7th Lord Aston of Forfar, as Lord Aston of Forfar in the peerage of Scotland.

== Life ==
Before inheriting the barony, Aston worked as a watchmaker.

Scottish Peers were entitled to vote to elect 16 Scottish representative peer to the House of Lords. In 1768 Lord Aston's right to vote in these elections raised objections as he was not listed on the Union Roll as his right to the title Lord Aston of Forfar was not confirmed.
I n 1769 King George III awarded Lord Aston an annual pension of £300. In this award, King George refers to Walter as "Walter, Lord Aston, Baron of Forfar".

The Gentleman's Magazine referred to him as "an inoffensive man of rather a convivial (Note: Convivial: Cheerful and friendly; jovial) turn".

Lord Aston of Forfar died in London on 29 July 1805 at the age of 72. He was buried at the Grosvenor Chapel in London.

== Family ==
Walter married Anne Hutchinson on 28 May 1766. Anne was the daughter of Peter Hutchinson. She died in 1808 and was buried at Bath Abbey. They had three children:

- Elizabeth Jane, who died young
- Walter, a Church of England Clergyman who succeeded his father as 9th Lord Aston of Forfar.
- William Bailey, who was lost at sea, and elder son Walter Aston,

== See also ==
- Lord Aston of Forfar

Peerage of Scotland
Preceded by Walter Aston	Lord Aston of Forfar; 1763–1805	Succeeded by Walter Aston
