= Henry Clifford (legal writer) =

English legal writer (1768–1813)

Henry Clifford (2 March 1768 – 22 April 1813) was an English legal writer.

== Life ==
Clifford was the second son of the Hon. Thomas Clifford of Tixall, Staffordshire (brother to Hugh Clifford, 4th Baron Clifford of Chudleigh), by his wife Barbara, youngest daughter and co-heiress of James Aston, 5th Lord Aston of Forfar, and niece to Thomas and Edward, dukes of Norfolk, and to George, earl of Shrewsbury. He was born on 2 March 1768; studied at Liege with his eldest brother Thomas, created a baronet in 1815; and on his return to England applied himself to the law, and soon after the passing of the Roman Catholic Relief Act 1791 was called to the bar at Lincoln's Inn. He was very learned in the law and a warm advocate of the liberties of the people. His personal exertions in the memorable 'O. P.' contest at Covent Garden Theatre brought him prominently before the public. He was a sincere Catholic, and it was chiefly owing to his efforts that a Catholic chapel was opened at Chelsea in 1812.

He died at Bath on 22 April 1813. Three months previously he had married Anne Teresa, youngest daughter of Edward Ferrers of Baddesley-Clinton, Warwickshire.

== Works ==
- 'Reflections on the Appointment of a Catholic Bishop [Douglass] to the London District, in a letter to the Catholic Laity of the said District,' Lond. 1790, 8vo.
- 'A Report of the Two Cases of Controverted Elections of the Borough of Southwark, &c.; to which are added an account of the two subsequent cases of the city of Canterbury, and an appendix on the right of the returning officer to administer the oath of supremacy to Catholics,' Lond. 1797 and 1802, 8vo. A copy in the British Museum contains a manuscript letter from the author to Francis Hargrave.
- 'Proceedings in the House of Lords in the Case of Benjamin Flower, printer, for a supposed Libel on the Bishop of Landaff; to which are added the arguments in the King's Bench on a motion for an Habeas Corpus,' Lond. 1800, 8vo.
- 'Observations on the Doctrines advanced during the late Elections, in a letter to Samuel Whitbread, Esq.,' 1807, 8vo.
- 'Clifford for ever! O. P., and no P. B. The trial between H. Clifford, plaintiff, and J. Brandon, defendant, for an assault and false imprisonment as the plaintiff was quitting Covent Garden Theatre, 31 Oct. 1809,' Lond. [1809], 8vo.
- 'The whole Proceedings on Trial of an Action brought by Henry Clifford, Esq., against Mr. James Brandon for an assault and false imprisonment on 5 Dec. 1809/ Lond. 1809, 8vo.
- 'A Poetical Epistle to Henry Clifford, Esq., on the late Disturbances in Co vent Garden Theatre,' Edinburgh, 1810, 8vo.
