= Mary Chichester =

English diarist

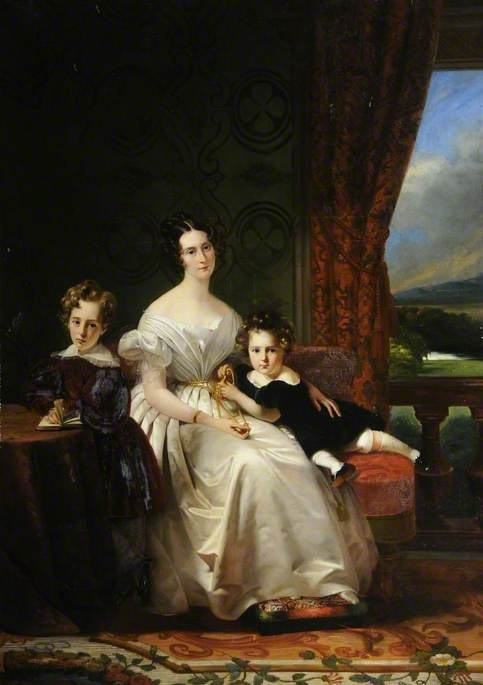
- Mary Barbara Chichester and her two eldest sons
- Born: Mary Clifford; 29 October 1801; Tixall, Staffordshire, England
- Died: 14 December 1876 (aged 75); South Kensington, England
- Known for: her diary and travels

Mary Barbara Chichester later Lady Chichester born Mary Clifford became Mary Barbara Constable (29 October 1801 – 14 December 1876) was an English Catholic diarist.

== Life ==
She was born in Tixall Hall in 1801. Her parents were Mary MacDonald and Thomas Hugh Clifford. Her father was a topographer and botanist who would take the family name of Clifford Constable in 1821. She had a brother, a sister and a strict Catholic upbringing. In 1822 she started a diary, characteristically while travelling, in this case to Ghent.

In 1826 Mary Clifford Constable married her cousin Charles Chichester, an army officer. He had been brought up a Catholic, attending Stonyhurst College. They had 11 children, with five surviving their childhood. She lived at Calverleigh Court until 1835 when she followed her husband, living at Pau; and then in 1837 they were in British North America.

Her husband was knighted at St James Palace in 1840 and that autumn they sailed west to be based in Trinidad. In 1842-3 they were in still in Trinidad where her husband was the acting Lieutenant Governor.

They then went to North America where she was able to visit the Great Lakes and see Niagara Falls. On 6 April 1847 she completed her husband's diary after he had died after four days of abdominal pain.

She returned to England before moving to Paris where she witnessed the 1848 revolution. She visited France, Italy, Switzerland, Germany, and Belgium in the 1850s and she completed her life by travelling between locations in Britain.

== Death and legacy ==
Chichester died in South Kensington in 1876 after an abscess on her thigh. Her portrait by Claude Marie Dubufe is at Burton Constable Hall.

Her diaries and papers are held with those of her husband at Hull University Archives. The records start with letters before her marriage.
