= Walter Aston, 2nd Lord Aston of Forfar =

The Right Honourable Walter Aston
- Lord Aston of Forfar
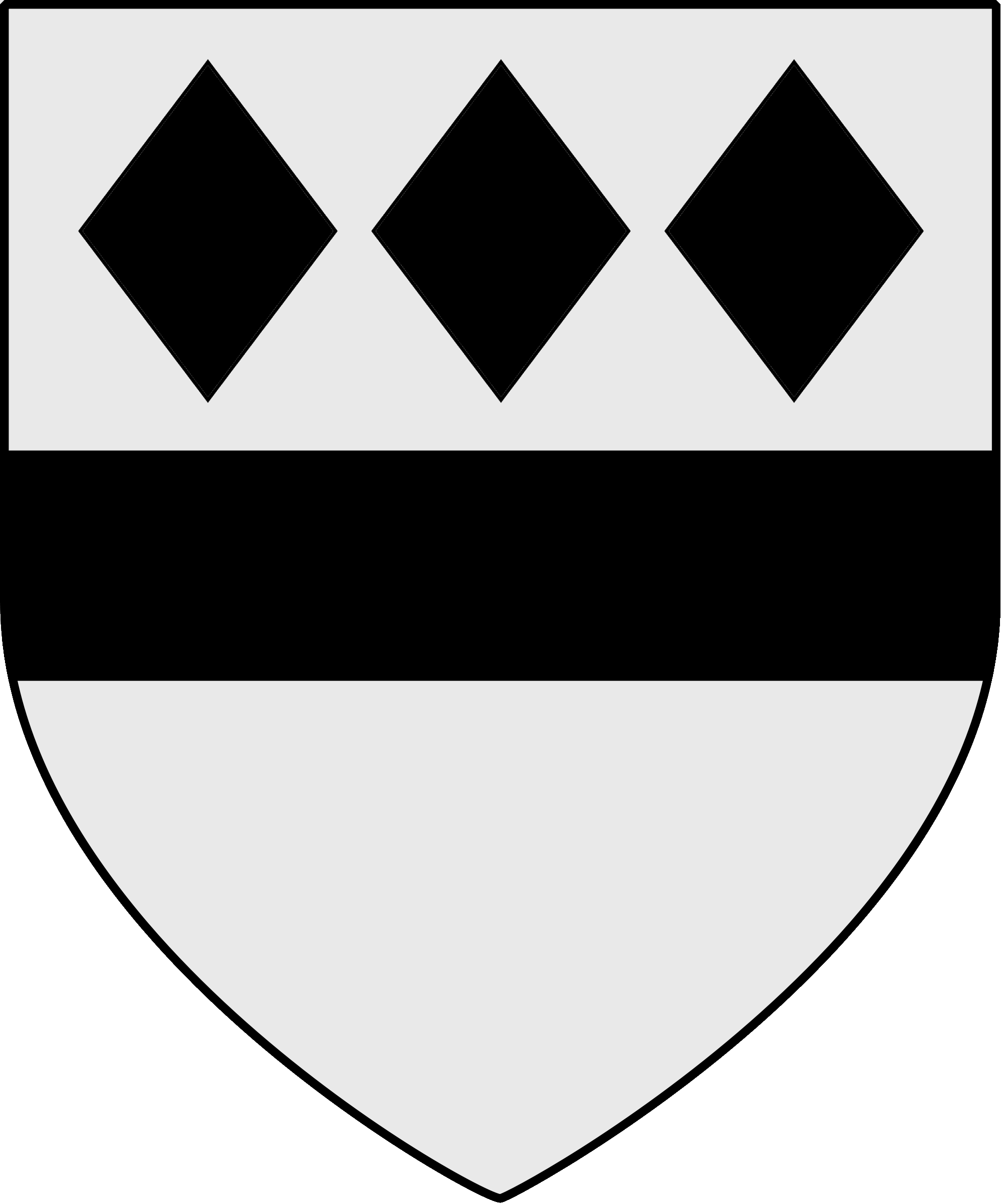
- Coat of arms
- Reign: Charles I; Charles II
- Predecessor: Walter Aston, 1st Lord Aston of Forfar
- Successor: Walter Aston, 3rd Lord Aston of Forfar
- Born: 6 April 1609; Tixall, Staffordshire
- Died: 23 April 1678 (aged 69)
- Buried: St Mary's Church, Stafford
- Residence: Tixall Hall; Standon Lordship
- Noble family: Aston
- Spouse: Mary Weston (m. 1629)
- Issue: Walter Aston, 3rd Lord Aston of Forfar; Thomas Aston; William Aston; Elizabeth Aston; Gertrude Aston; Mary Aston; Frances Aston; Anne Aston
- Father: Walter Aston, 1st Lord Aston of Forfar
- Mother: Gertrude Sadleir
- Occupation: Royalist

Walter Aston, 2nd Lord Aston of Forfar (6 April 1609 – 23 April 1678) was the second and eldest surviving son of Walter Aston, 1st Lord Aston of Forfar, and Gertrude Sadleir, daughter of Sir Thomas Sadleir of Standon, Hertfordshire, and his second wife Gertrude Markham. Lady Aston was the granddaughter of the noted Elizabethan statesman Sir Ralph Sadler.

== Biography ==
In 1639, he succeeded his father as Lord Aston of Forfar in the peerage of Scotland, and, in 1661, at the death of his maternal uncle Ralph Sadleir, he inherited the lordship of Standon and other estates in Hertfordshire, England. His principal seat was Tixall in Staffordshire.

Lord Aston was a staunch Royalist during the English Civil War. He was present at the Siege of Lichfield in 1643 and the surrender of Oxford; King Charles I expressed his regret at not being able to reward him as he deserved. After the failure of the Royalist cause, he was required to compound his estates and live in private.

He married, in 1629, Lady Mary Weston, daughter of Richard Weston, 1st Earl of Portland, Lord High Treasurer of England, and his first wife Elizabeth Pyncheon. He was an ardent Roman Catholic (his father was a convert to Catholicism who raised all his children in that faith, and his father-in-law was also a Catholic convert) and was the effective leader of the large Catholic community in Staffordshire, although he was unwilling to admit his faith publicly. When he was charged with recusancy in 1675 he wrote indignantly (and quite untruthfully) to the Secretary of State stating that "he never went to Mass or joined in any worship particular to the Church of Rome ". He also stated that the local Justices of the Peace, "my eminent neighbours", all assured him that they had no suspicions as to his faith "and that I was no such man". No further action was taken against him.

"The munificent Lord Aston" was extremely popular locally, and a thousand mourners are said to have attended his funeral: it is notable that no attempt was made to conceal the celebration of Catholic rites at the funeral, even though many of the mourners must have been Protestants. He died on 23 April 1678, and was succeeded by his eldest son Walter Aston, 3rd Lord Aston of Forfar, who inherited his father's role as protector of the Staffordshire Catholic community, and narrowly avoided becoming one of the martyrs of the Popish Plot, as did his younger brother, William.

He was buried at St Mary's Church, Stafford. His widow did not long survive him: according to her son-in-law Sir John Southcote (who married her daughter Elizabeth), "she grew melancholy and lost her wits, keeping almost perpetual silence and refusing nourishment".

They had four other daughters, Gertrude (a nun), Mary, Frances, who married Sir Edward Gage, 1st Baronet, and Anne, who married Henry Somerset of Pauntley Court, a grandson of Henry Somerset, 1st Marquess of Worcester; and two younger sons Thomas and William.

== See also ==
- Lord Aston of Forfar

== Notes ==
Peerage of Scotland
Preceded by Walter Aston	Lord Aston of Forfar; 1639–1678	Succeeded by Walter Aston
