= Geib Company =

FAMILY BUSINESS

The Geib Company was a family business which under various partnership names, produced and sold pianofortes, organs, and sheet music in New York City in the nineteenth century.

== History ==
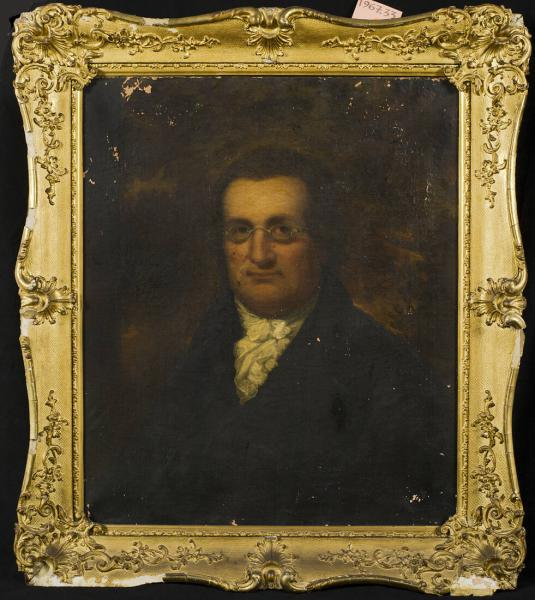
Portrait of John Geib by John Wesley Jarvis

Johannes Geib (John Geib, Sr.) was an organ maker from Staudernheim, Germany. Trained there, he resettled to England about 1760 to practice his craft. He first worked with established firms, and later with Lenkfeld as a partner. There he was awarded several patents for innovative piano mechanisms such as the grasshopper action. Marrying an English woman, they had twins John Jr. and Adam ca.1780, George ca 1782, and William ca. 1793. In 1797 he elected to resettle again, to New York. There he established Geib & Company as an organ maker from 1800 to 1802. Following a bankruptcy, he partnered with his son John Jr. to operate Geib & Son, building organs and pianofortes until 1814. John Jr. had another partnership with brother Adam as J. & A. Geib from 1804 to 1808 and again 1816–17.
