= Walter Aston, 7th Lord Aston of Forfar =

Walter Aston, 7th Lord Aston of Forfar, succeeded his brother Philip Aston, 6th Lord Aston of Forfar, as Lord Aston of Forfar in the peerage of Scotland in 1755.

He died without a direct heir in 1763, and thus his title passed to his cousin, Walter Aston, 8th Lord Aston of Forfar.

== See also ==
- Lord Aston of Forfar

Peerage of Scotland
Preceded by Philip Aston	Lord Aston of Forfar; 1755–1763	Succeeded by Walter Aston
