= Lord Aston of Forfar =

Title in the Peerage of Scotland

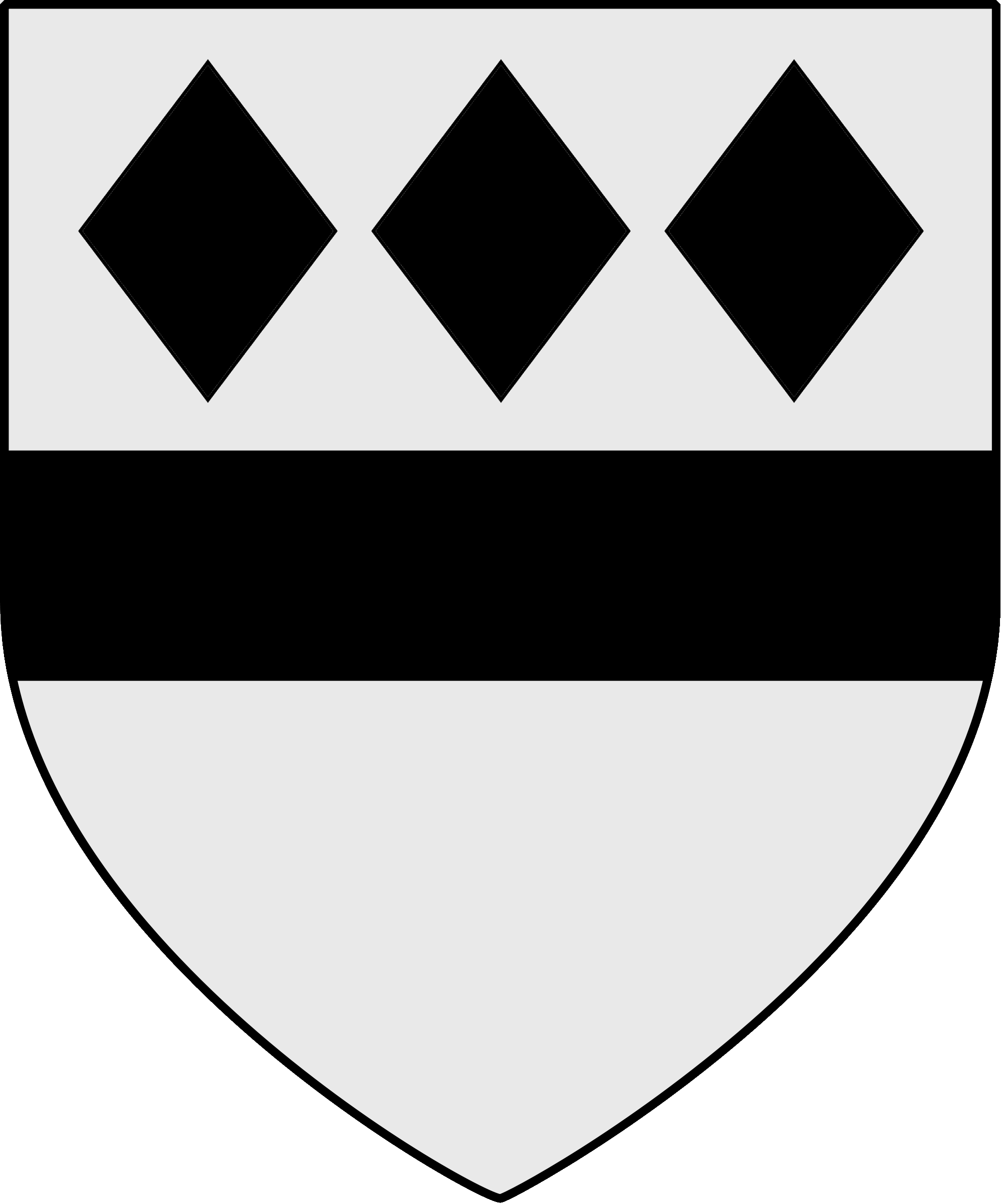
- Lord Aston of Forfar

Lord Aston of Forfar was a title in the Peerage of Scotland. The barony was created on 28 November 1627 for Sir Walter Aston, Bt, who had previously been created Baronet of Tixall Hall, Staffordshire (in the Baronetage of England) on 22 May 1611.

On the death of the 5th Lord, on 24 August 1751, the Tixall Baronetcy became extinct. However, the title fate of the Aston of Forfar barony is unclear.

Sir John Bernard Burke believed the original letters patent stated that on the failure of the 1st Lord's line, the title should pass to his brother and his heirs. The barony is thought to have passed to a distant relative: Philip Aston, the great-great-grandson of the 1st Lord's brother, who was styled as the 6th Lord during his lifetime. Later research, however, has shown there may have been a more senior descendant, meaning the 6th and 7th Lords were probably not entitled to the title, despite being styled as "Lord Aston of Forfar" during their lifetimes.

George Cokayne, however, acknowledges the assumption of the title by the 8th and 9th Lords as "possibly lawful"; with the 8th Lord receiving recognition by King George III.

== History ==
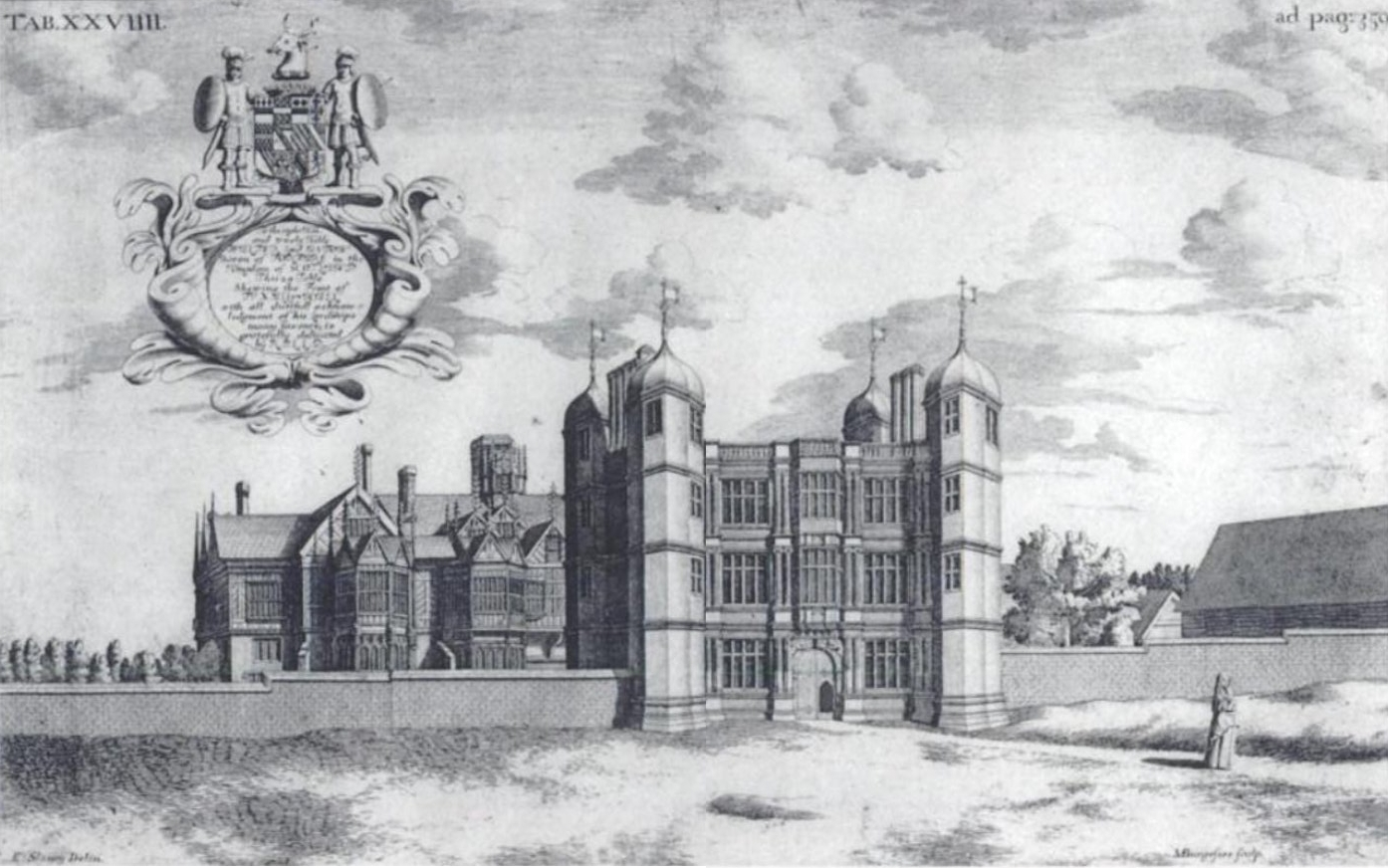
Tixall House and Gatehouse (c. 1686) by R. Plot.

The early Lords Aston were devoutly Roman Catholic and used their wealth and influence to make Tixall a safe haven for Catholics. They were also staunch Royalists, which meant that the Crown was usually prepared to tolerate their religious beliefs. The 2nd Lord Aston was accused of recusancy, but the charges were quickly dropped. During the Popish Plot, the 3rd Lord Aston was sent to the Tower of London, but in due course was released without standing trial.

Walter Aston, 1st Lord Aston of Forfar, had a sister, Anne, who married Ambrose Elton, Esq., of The Hazle, Ledbury, Herefordshire. Elton served as Sheriff of Herefordshire in 1618, and was a graduate of Brasenose College, Oxford, which his ancestors had founded.

=== After the 5th Lord ===
With the death of the 5th Lord, the main line of the family, and the Baronet title, became extinct. The fate of the barony of "Aston of Forfar" is unclear.

Burke states the title passed to Philip Aston, the great-great-grandson of the 1st Lord's brother. Philip died unmarried and without issue; the title would thus pass to his younger brother Walter.
Philip and Walter's right to use the title was, however, later disputed. Both were styled as "6th and 7th Lord Aston of Forfar" but, probably unbeknownst to them, there was a male descendant on a more senior line, William Aston of Beaulieu, County Louth, Ireland who outlived them, and was thus the legitimate (but at the time unrecognised) 6th Lord.

Philip, Walter, and the legitimate senior claimant, all died without male issue. The two claims to the title were then reunited in a single person: Walter Aston; Philip and Walter's first cousin.

Walter was styled at the time as the 8th Lord, but his uncertain status caused problems in his career. Scottish Peers were entitled to vote to elect 16 Scottish representative peers to the House of Lords. In 1768 Walter's right to vote in these elections raised objections as he was not listed on the Union Roll.
Walter's right to the title seems to have been confirmed, however, when in 1769 King George III referred to him as "Walter, Lord Aston, Baron of Forfar", and granted him an annual pension of £300.

Following Walter's death, the title passed to his only son, the clergyman Walter Aston. He attempted to get official recognition for the barony, but died before the matter was settled. His claim as 9th Lord Aston of Forfar is called "possibly lawful" by Cokayne; who states the title became "dormant" with his death.

=== Modern Claimants ===
The title is currently considered extinct. It is, however, still claimed by descendants of the Aston family. The current claimant's right to use the title is disputed and unrecognised.

== Aston baronets, of Tixall (1611) ==
- Sir Walter Aston, 1st Baronet (1584–1639) (created Lord Aston of Forfar in 1627)

== Lords Aston of Forfar (1627) ==
- Walter Aston, 1st Lord Aston of Forfar (1584–1639)
- Walter Aston, 2nd Lord Aston of Forfar (1609–1678)
- Walter Aston, 3rd Lord Aston of Forfar (1633–1714)
- Walter Aston, 4th Lord Aston of Forfar (1660–1748)
- James Aston, 5th Lord Aston of Forfar (1723–1751)

- Philip Aston, 6th Lord Aston of Forfar (–1755) Distant cousin of the 5th Lord (Note: Both Philip and Walter were styled as 6th and 7th Lord Aston of Forfar. However, after their deaths evidence was discovered to suggest there may have been a more senior descendant. Although this senior descendant died without male issue, he outlived Philip and Walter, and thus should have inherited the barony instead of them.)
- Walter Aston, 7th Lord Aston of Forfar (–1763) Younger brother of the 6th Lord (Note: Both Philip and Walter were styled as 6th and 7th Lord Aston of Forfar. However, after their deaths evidence was discovered to suggest there may have been a more senior descendant. Although this senior descendant died without male issue, he outlived Philip and Walter, and thus should have inherited the barony instead of them.)

- Walter Hutchinson Aston, 8th Lord Aston of Forfar (1732–1805) Heir general of both Walter and Philip, and of the senior descendant. 1st cousin of the 5th and 6th Lord. Referred to as "Walter, Lord Aston, Baron of Forfar" by King George III
- Rev. Walter Hutchinson Aston, 9th Lord Aston of Forfar (1769–1845) Only son of the 8th Lord. Died without issue.

== Sources ==
- Leigh Rayment's Peerage Pages
- Courthope, William (editor). (1836.) "Debrett's Complete Peerage of The United Kingdom of Great Britain and Ireland, 21st edition". Printed for J. G. & F. Rivington and others by G. Woodfall: London, page 400. Retrieved 2013-01-29.
- Lodge, Edmund. (1845.) "The peerage of the British empire as at present existing, 14th edition". Printed by G. J. Palmer: London. Retrieved 2013-01-29.
- Harrison, "A Genealogical History of the Dormant, Abeyant, Forfeited, and Extinct Peerages of the British Empire". Retrieved 2013-01-29.
